= List of Asian Pacific American Medal of Honor recipients =

The Medal of Honor was created during the American Civil War and is the highest military decoration presented by the United States government to a member of its armed forces. The recipient must have distinguished himself at the risk of his own life above and beyond the call of duty in action against an enemy of the United States. Due to the nature of this medal, it is commonly presented posthumously. Of the 3,515 Medals of Honor awarded as of 2023, 36 have been awarded to Asian-American recipients.

Born in Bombay, India, Anglo-Indian Charles J. Simons, who was awarded the Medal of Honor in 1896 for his actions in the Battle of the Crater in 1864 during the American Civil War.

In 1996, a study determined that Asian Pacific Americans were discriminated against in the awarding of medals during World War II; consequently, 22 had their medals upgraded to the Medal of Honor. Except for those awarded during the 1996 discrimination study the most recent Asian-American recipient of the Medal of Honor was Rodney Yano, who received it for his actions during the Vietnam War.

In 2022, President Joe Biden awarded four Medal of Honors to Vietnam War veterans, two of which are Asian-American veterans Edward N. Kaneshiro and Dennis Fujii, the first awarded to Asian-American soldiers in 26 years (since 1996).

Dennis Fujii is the only currently living Asian-American Medal of Honor recipient as of 2023.

== 19th century and peacetime ==
Sergeant Charles J. Simons, an Anglo-Indian-American, was born in Bombay, India. Simons was awarded the Medal of Honor in 1896 for his actions during the Siege of Petersburg in 1864.

James Smith was the first person born on the Sandwich Islands to be awarded the Medal of Honor, awarded to him in 1872 for actions aboard the USS Kansas.

== Philippine–American War and peacetime ==
The Philippine–American War (Note: This conflict is also known as the Philippine Insurrection. This name was historically the most commonly used in the U.S., but Filipinos and some American historians refer to these hostilities as the Philippine–American War, and, in 1999, the U.S. Library of Congress reclassified its references to use this term.) was an armed military conflict between the United States and the internationally unrecognized First Philippine Republic, fought between 1899 and least 1902, which arose from a Filipino political struggle against U.S. occupation of the Philippines. Although the conflict was officially declared over on July 4, 1902, American troops continued hostilities against remnants of the Philippine Army and other resistance groups until 1913, and some historians consider these unofficial extensions part of the war.

During this conflict one Asian American, José Nísperos, received the Medal of Honor for continuing to fight after being seriously wounded.

Telesforo Trinidad received a Medal of Honor after rescuing two men from a boiler explosion and was the second and last Asian-American serviceman to receive the Medal during peacetime.

Image	Name	Service	Rank	Date of action	Place of action	Unit	Notes
—	José B. Nísperos	Army	Private	September 24, 1911	Lapurap, Basilan	Philippine Scouts	Although seriously wounded, continued to fight until the enemy was repulsed
Middle aged Filipino American male wearing a white suite with a neck order medal, and two other medals on the lapel.	Telesforo Trinidad	Navy	Fireman Second Class	January 21, 1915	aboard USS San Diego	USS San Diego	Rescued two men after a boiler explosion despite being injured. Ensign Cary received a Medal of Honor for the same event.

== World War II ==
World War II, or the Second World War, was a global military conflict, the joining of what had initially been two separate conflicts. The first began in Asia in 1937 as the Second Sino-Japanese War; the other began in Europe in 1939 with the German invasion of Poland. This global conflict split the majority of the world's nations into two opposing military alliances: the Allies and the Axis powers. It involved the mobilization of over 100 million military personnel, making it the most widespread war in history, and placed the participants in a state of total war, erasing the distinction between civil and military resources. This resulted in the complete activation of a nation's economic, industrial, and scientific capabilities for the purposes of the war effort. Over 60 million people, the majority of them civilians, were killed, making it the deadliest conflict in human history. The Allies were victorious, and, as a result, the United States and Soviet Union emerged as the world's two leading superpowers.

During this conflict 464 United States military personnel received the Medal of Honor, 266 of them posthumously. By the end of the war, only two Asian Americans had been awarded the Medal of Honor, Sergeant Jose Calugas of the Philippine Scouts and Private Sadao S. Munemori of the 442nd Regimental Combat Team. A 1996 study commissioned by the United States Army by order of Congress investigated racial discrimination in the awarding of medals during World War II. The Command History Office at the Defense Language Institute Foreign Language Center at the Presidio of Monterey, California was tasked with identifying affected service-members and reviewing the records. After performing a review of the files, the study recommended that several Asian Americans and Pacific Islanders who received the Distinguished Service Cross during World War II should be upgraded to the Medal of Honor. On June 21, 2000, President Bill Clinton awarded the Medal to 22 Asian Americans, 21 from the aforementioned study, in a ceremony at the White House.

Of the 24 Asian-American awardees, 21 earned the Medal while serving with the 442nd Regimental Combat Team or its component unit, the 100th Infantry Battalion, making the 442nd the most decorated regiment-sized unit of the war. Only two Asian-American officers received the Medal of Honor during World War II: (Note: In the United States military an enlisted rank is below a commissioned officer and warrant officer and in most cases perform specific jobs. The warrant officer ranks are between enlisted and commissioned officers and are usually highly skilled, single-track specialty officers. Although warrant officers can serve at varying levels and in many jobs the warrant officer's primary task as a leader is to serve as a technical expert, providing skills, guidance, and expertise to commanders and organizations in their particular field. Commissioned officers are typically the only persons, in a military environment, able to act as the commanding officer of a military unit. They generally receive training in leadership, managerial skills and general skills training in career field. Commissioned officers are typically assigned as leaders in a given field with a general title such as infantry officer.) Captain Francis B. Wai who received it for drawing enemy fire to himself to reveal their positions and Second Lieutenant Daniel Inouye who received his medal for destroying two machine gun nests and continuing to fight after being wounded. Inouye became the first U.S. Representative for Hawaii and the first Japanese American congressman; he served as one of Hawaii's U.S. senators from 1963 continuously until his death in 2012.

This with the * indicates that the Medal of Honor was awarded posthumously

Image	Name	Service	Rank	Date of action	Place of action	Unit	Notes
Filipino male in World War II Army Khaki uniform saluting.	Jose Calugas	Army	Sergeant	January 16, 1942	Culis, Bataan Province, Philippines	88th Field Artillery Regiment, Philippine Scouts	Under heavy fire, organized and led a gun crew after the original crew had been killed or wounded
A young man in his army dress uniform with no hat. He appears to be in a seated position and is smiling.	Rudolph B. Davila	Army	Staff Sergeant	May 28, 1944	Artena, Italy	7th Infantry Regiment, 3rd Infantry Division	Led his unit by example and, although wounded, single-handedly attacked an enemy-held house
A young man in his army dress uniform. He is sitting and staring forward towards the camera with and he is not smiling. He has a high brimmed hat.	Barney F. Hajiro	Army	Private	October 19, 1944 – October 22, 1944, and October 29, 1944	near Bruyères and Biffontaine, eastern France	442nd Regimental Combat Team	Assisted an attack on a house, captured a numerically superior force, and single-handedly silenced two machine gun nests
The head and shoulders of a young man in his Army dress uniform. He is standing and staring forward towards the camera with his hat cocked to the side.	Mikio Hasemoto*	Army	Private	November 29, 1943	Cerasuolo, Italy	100th Infantry Battalion	With his squad leader, destroyed an enemy force despite having to run through heavy fire twice to retrieve new weapons
Head and shoulders of a smiling young man wearing a garrison cap and a military jacket with chevrons on the upper sleeve over a shirt and tie	Joe Hayashi*	Army	Private	April 20, 1945, and April 22, 1945	Cerasuolo, Italy	442nd Regimental Combat Team	Led an attack on strongly defended positions and single-handedly silenced three machine guns
Head of a man with ruffled hair wearing a light colored shirt and tie.	Shizuya Hayashi	Army	Private	November 29, 1943	Cerasuolo, Italy	100th Infantry Battalion	Single-handedly silenced a machine gun nest and an anti-aircraft gun
An older man wearing a suit with an American and Hawaiian flag in the background. He is seated and is staring forward toward the camera.	Daniel Inouye	Army	Second Lieutenant	April 21, 1945	near San Terenzo, Italy	442nd Regimental Combat Team	Single-handedly destroyed two machine gun nests, continued to fight and lead his platoon after being wounded
Head of a man wearing a garrison cap and a tie and shirt with a crossed-rifles pin on the collar.	Yeiki Kobashigawa	Army	Technical Sergeant	June 2, 1944	near Lanuvio, Italy	100th Infantry Battalion	Led successful attacks on four machine gun positions
Head of a man wearing a garrison cap and a light colored shirt and tie.	Robert T. Kuroda*	Army	Staff Sergeant	October 20, 1944	near Bruyeres, France	442nd Regimental Combat Team	Single-handedly destroyed two machine gun emplacements
An older man in his military uniform with a hat on. There is a house and a tree in the background. He is looking forward at the camera.	Kaoru Moto*	Army	Private First Class	July 7, 1944	near Castellina, Italy	100th Infantry Battalion	Single-handedly attacked two machine guns and, although wounded, captured a third
Head and shoulders of a smiling young man wearing a garrison cap and a shirt and tie, the bottom of the tie tucked into the shirt between the buttons.	Sadao Munemori*	Army	Private First Class	April 5, 1945	near Seravezza, Italy	100th Infantry Battalion, 442nd Regimental Combat Team	Single-handedly attacked two machine guns before smothering a grenade blast with his body
Head and shoulders of a young man looking directly at the camera and wearing a garrison cap and dark colored military jacket over a shirt and tie. The outer half of his left eyebrow is missing.	Kiyoshi Muranaga*	Army	Private First Class	June 26, 1944	near Suvereto, Italy	442nd Regimental Combat Team	Engaged an artillery gun alone, using a mortar
Head of a man with a subdued smile wearing a garrison cap tilted over his left ear and a military jacket over a shirt and tie.	Masato Nakae*	Army	Private	August 19, 1944	near Pisa, Italy	100th Infantry Battalion, 442nd Regimental Combat Team	Held off an enemy attack and continued to fight after being wounded
Head and shoulders of a young man standing erect, wearing a garrison cap and a military jacket over a shirt and tie.	Shinyei Nakamine*	Army	Private	June 2, 1944	near La Torreto, Italy	100th Infantry Battalion	Single-handedly destroyed a machine gun nest and led attacks on two others
Head of a smiling young man wearing a peaked cap with a round medallion on the front and a military jacket over a shirt and tie.	William Nakamura*	Army	Private First Class	July 4, 1944	near Castellina, Italy	442nd Regimental Combat Team	Silenced a machine gun nest and stayed behind to provide covering fire as his unit withdrew
Head and shoulders of a smiling young man with dimples and round wire-framed glasses wearing a garrison cap and a military jacket over a shirt and tie.	Joe M. Nishimoto*	Army	Private First Class	November 7, 1944	near La Houssiere, France	442nd Regimental Combat Team	Single-handedly neutralized three machine gun positions
—	Allan M. Ohata*	Army	Sergeant	November 29, 1943 – November 30, 1943	near Cerasuolo, Italy	100th Infantry Battalion	Together with a rifleman, held back an attack by a numerically superior force
Head and shoulders of a young man with a bright smile and neatly combed hair wearing what appears to be a graduation gown over a shirt and tie.	James K. Okubo*	Army	Technician Fifth Grade	October 28, 1944 – October 29, 1944, and November 4, 1944	Foret Domaniale de Champ, near Biffontaine, France	442nd Regimental Combat Team	Repeatedly exposed himself to intense fire to treat and evacuate wounded men
Head and shoulders of an elderly man wearing a white button shirt with an emblem on the left breast	Yukio Okutsu	Army	Technical Sergeant	April 7, 1945	Mount Belvedere, Italy	442nd Regimental Combat Team	Single-handedly silenced three machine gun positions
Head and shoulders of a young man with a garrison cap tilted over his right ear wearing a scarf tied around his neck and a military jacket with three ribbon bars and a pin on the left breast. Written over the lower right of the photo are the words "Your pal always, Frank".	Frank H. Ono*	Army	Private First Class	July 4, 1944	near Castellina, Italy	442nd Regimental Combat Team	Held an advance position alone, treated wounded men, and remained behind to provide covering fire as his unit withdrew
Head and shoulders of a young man wearing a garrison cap and a military jacket with three chevrons on the upper left sleeve and a whistle hanging from a chain attached to his right shoulder. In the top left corner of the photo is written "To Mom & Dad" and in the lower right "your son! Kazuo".	Kazuo Otani*	Army	Staff Sergeant	July 15, 1944	near Pieve Di St. Luce, Italy	442nd Regimental Combat Team	Drew fire onto himself so his platoon could reach cover, killed while rescuing a wounded man
Head and shoulders of a smiling young man wearing a peaked cap and, over a shirt and tie, a military jacket with a round pin on each lapel.	George T. Sakato	Army	Private	October 29, 1944	Hill 617, near Biffontaine, France	442nd Regimental Combat Team	Charged an enemy strongpoint, took command of his platoon and led it in defense of their position
Head and torso of a serious faced man wearing a garrison cap and a military jacket with bright buttons and a patch and stripes on the upper sleeve.	Ted T. Tanouye*	Army	Technical Sergeant	July 7, 1944	near Molino A Ventoabbto, Italy	442nd Regimental Combat Team	Although wounded, single-handedly attacked a series of enemy positions
Head of a young man wearing a peaked cap with a large, shiny emblem on the front and a dark military jacket.	Francis B. Wai*	Army	Captain	October 20, 1944	Leyte, Philippine Islands	34th Infantry Regiment	Took command of four assault waves and led by example, drew fire onto himself to reveal enemy positions

== Korean War ==
The Korean War was a three-year conflict that began with the North Korean invasion of South Korea following clashes along the border. In a narrow sense, some may refer to it as a civil war, though each side was supported by international actors. After failing to strengthen their cause in the free elections held in South Korea during May 1950 and the refusal of South Korea to hold new elections per North Korean demands, the communist North Korean Army moved south on June 25, 1950, to attempt to reunite the Korean peninsula, which had been formally divided since 1948. The conflict was then expanded by the United States and the Soviet Union's involvement as part of the larger Cold War. The main hostilities were during the period from June 25, 1950, until the armistice was signed on July 27, 1953. In the early stages of the war, President Harry Truman sometimes described the conflict under the aegis of the United Nations as a "police action" rather than use the term war.

Three Asian Americans received the Medal of Honor for their actions during the Korean War. Hiroshi H. Miyamura was captured by Chinese forces and held as a prisoner of war for 28 months. For his protection, news of his Medal of Honor award was classified until his release from captivity.

This with the † indicates that the Medal of Honor was awarded posthumously

Image	Name	Service	Rank	Date of action	Place of action	Unit	Notes
Young man in military uniform, standing with his arm resting on his raised knee.	Hiroshi H. Miyamura	Army	Corporal	April 24, 1951 – April 25, 1951	Taejon-ni, Korea	7th Infantry Regiment, 3rd Infantry Division	Fought in close quarters combat, stayed behind to provide covering fire while his unit withdrew
Anthony T. Kahoʻohanohano	Anthony T. Kahoʻohanohano †	Army	Private First Class	September 1, 1951	near Chup'a-ri, Korea	Company H, 17th Infantry Regiment, 7th Infantry Division	Although wounded, held a position alone and fought hand-to-hand until being killed
	Herbert K. Pililaau †	Army	Private First Class	September 17, 1951	Pia-ri, Korea	Company C, 23d Infantry Regiment, 2nd Infantry Division	After being killed fighting the enemy it was determined that he singlehandedly defeated more than 40 of the enemy
—	Wataru Nakamura †	Army	Private First Class	May 18, 1951	P’ungch’on-ni, Korea	Company I, 38th Infantry Regiment, 2nd Infantry Division	Singlehandedly attacked and destroyed an enemy machinegun emplacement, and drove the enemy from several bunkers.

== Vietnam War ==
The Vietnam War, also known as the Second Indochina War, and in Vietnam as “the war against America”, occurred from 1959 to April 30, 1975. The term Vietnam Conflict is often used to refer to events which took place between 1959 and April 30, 1975. The war was fought between the Communist-supported Democratic Republic of Vietnam and the United States supported Republic of Vietnam. It concluded with the defeat and failure of the United States foreign policy in Vietnam. On April 30, 1975, the capital of South Vietnam, Saigon fell to the communist forces of North Vietnam, effectively ending the Vietnam War. Over 8.7 million U.S. forces participated in the Vietnam War; of whom slightly over 47,000 were killed in battle and almost 11,000 more died of non-battle causes.

During the Vietnam War, five Asian Americans received the Medal of Honor, four of them posthumously. Elmelindo Smith, although wounded multiple times was killed while fighting with his unit. Terry Kawamura sacrificed his life by jumping on an explosive charge, saving the lives of two other soldiers, and Rodney Yano sacrificed his life by throwing burning ammunition off of a helicopter after a grenade exploded prematurely. Edward N. Kaneshiro died less than a year after his Medal of Honor action in 1967 and did not receive the Medal until 2022, posthumously.

Dennis Fujii is the only living Asian-American Vietnam War veteran to be awarded the Medal of Honor in person. Fujii is also the only living Asian-American Medal of Honor recipient.

This with the † indicates that the Medal of Honor was awarded posthumously

Image	Name	Service	Rank	Date of action	Place of action	Unit	Notes
Head and shoulders of a young man wearing a peaked cap, black thick-rimmed glasses, and a military jacket with a round pin on each lapel over a shirt and tie.	Terry Teruo Kawamura †	Army	Corporal	March 20, 1969	Camp Radcliff, Republic of Vietnam	173rd Engineer Company, 173rd Airborne Brigade	Smothered the blast of an explosive charge with his body
A young man in his in his military uniform looking forward towards the camera. He has a slight smile and his head is down and to the left.	Elmelindo Smith †	Army	Staff Sergeant	February 16, 1967	Republic of Vietnam	2nd Battalion, 8th Infantry Regiment, 4th Infantry Division	Continued to organize his unit's defense after being repeatedly and mortally wounded
A young man in a shirt, tie and sweater. He is looking forward towards the camera and is smiling.	Rodney Yano †	Army	Sergeant First Class	January 1, 1969	near Bien Hao, Republic of Vietnam	Air Cavalry Troop, 11th Armored Cavalry Regiment	Grabbed burning ammunition and threw it from the aircraft after being seriously wounded in a premature grenade explosion aboard a helicopter
—	Edward N. Kaneshiro †	Army	Staff sergeant	December 1, 1966	Kim Son Valley, Vietnam	9th Cavalry Regiment	During a mission in the Kim Son Valley, on 1 December 1966, his unit came under fire from North Vietnamese People's Army of Vietnam (PAVN) troops. Kaneshiro crawled forward to attack, using six grenades and an M16 rifle. This saved the lives of U.S. soldiers allowing them to successfully advance.
	Dennis Fujii	Army	Specialist Five	February 18–22, 1971	Laos & Vietnam	67th Medical Group	

== See also ==
- Military history of Asian Americans
