= Munemori =

- Gender: Male

Origin
- Origin: Japanese
- Meaning: Different meanings depending on the kanji used

Munemori (written: 宗盛 or 宗森) is both a Japanese surname and a masculine Japanese given name. Notable people with the name include:

- Sadao Munemori (旨森 貞雄; 1922–1945), United States Army soldier
- Taira no Munemori (平 宗盛; 1147–1185), Japanese samurai
