= Masato Nakae =

United States Army Medal of Honor recipient

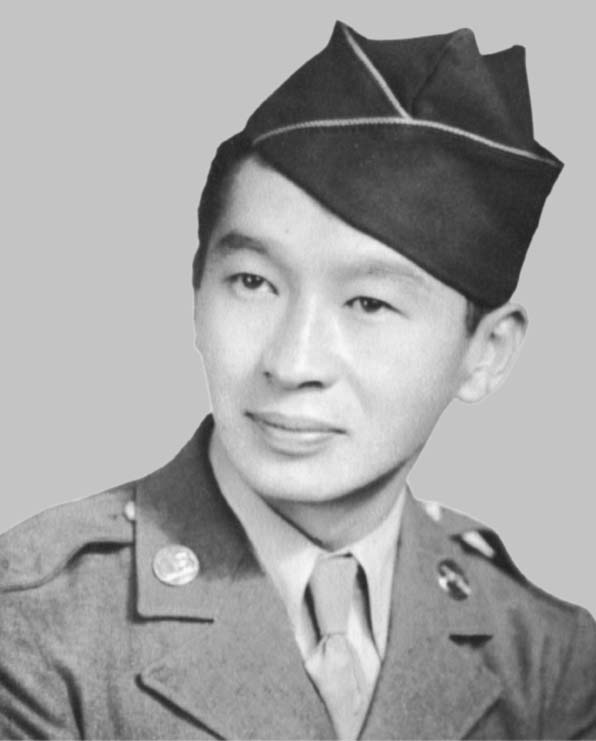
- Born: December 20, 1917; Lihue, Hawaii
- Died: September 4, 1998 (aged 80)
- Burial place: National Memorial Cemetery of the Pacific, Honolulu, Hawaii
- Military career
- Allegiance: United States of America
- Branch: United States Army
- Service years: 1942 - 1945
- Rank: Private First Class
- Nickname: Curly
- Unit: 100th Infantry Battalion
- Conflicts: World War II
- Awards: Medal of Honor; Purple Heart

Masato Nakae (Japanese: 中江 正人, December 20, 1917 – September 4, 1998) was a Japanese American United States Army soldier. He is best known for receiving the Medal of Honor because of his actions in World War II.

== Early life ==
Nakae was born in Hawaii to Japanese immigrant parents. He was a Nisei, which means that he was a second generation Japanese-American.

== Soldier ==
Two months after the Japanese attack on Pearl Harbor, Nakae joined the US Army in February 1942.

Nakae volunteered to be part of the all-Nisei 100th Infantry Battalion. This army unit was mostly made up of Japanese Americans from Hawaii.

For his actions in August 1944, he was awarded the Distinguished Service Cross. This award was upgraded to the Medal of Honor after Congress directed the Secretary of the Army to review all awards of the DSC to Americans of Japanese and Pacific Islands descent to determine if racial bias had influenced the awards process. Nakae was one of 22 Americans of Japanese descent who received the Medal of Honor on June 21, 2000 (about two years after his death) by President Bill Clinton.

== Medal of Honor citation ==
The President of the United States of America, authorized by Act of Congress, March 3, 1963, has awarded in the name of The Congress the Medal of Honor to

PRIVATE
MASATO NAKAE
UNITED STATES ARMY

for conspicuous gallantry and intrepidity at the risk of his life above and beyond the call of duty:

Private Masato Nakae distinguished himself by extraordinary heroism in action on August 19, 1944, near Pisa, Italy. When his submachine gun was damaged by a shell fragment during a fierce attack by a superior enemy force, Private Nakae quickly picked up his wounded comrade’s M-1 rifle and fired rifle grenades at the steadily advancing enemy. As the hostile force continued to close in on his position, Private Nakae threw six grenades and forced them to withdraw. During a concentrated enemy mortar barrage that preceded the next assault by the enemy force, a mortar shell fragment seriously wounded Private Nakae. Despite his injury, he refused to surrender his position and continued firing at the advancing enemy. By inflicting heavy casualties on the enemy force, he finally succeeded in breaking up the attack and caused the enemy to withdraw. Private Nakae’s extraordinary heroism and devotion to duty are in keeping with the highest traditions of military service and reflect great credit on him, his unit, and the United States Army.

== Awards and decorations ==

Badge	Combat Infantryman Badge		
1st row	Medal of Honor		
2nd row	Bronze Star Medal	Purple Heart	Army Good Conduct Medal
3rd row	American Campaign Medal	European–African–Middle Eastern Campaign Medal with 1 Campaign star	World War II Victory Medal

== See also ==
- List of Asian American Medal of Honor recipients
- List of Medal of Honor recipients for World War II
