= Kaoru Moto =

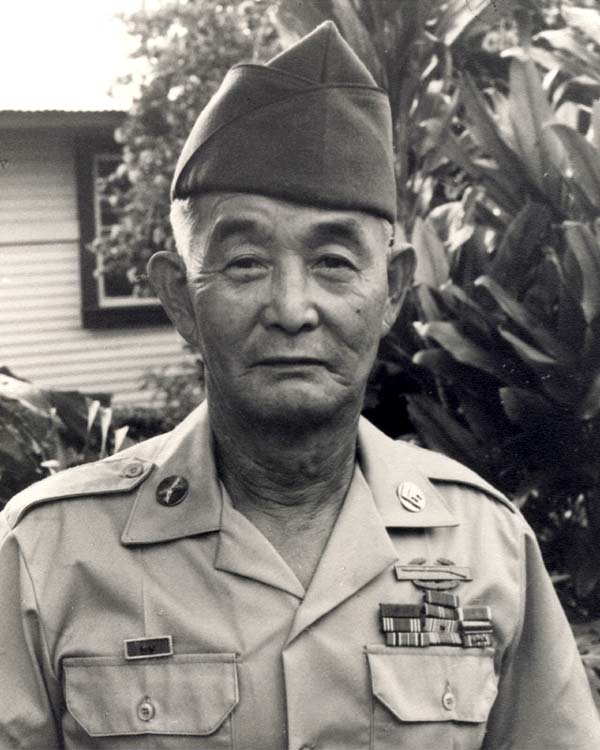
- Kaoru Moto, Medal of Honor recipient
- Born: April 25, 1917; Makawao, Territory of Hawaii
- Died: August 26, 1992 (aged 75); Makawao, Hawaii
- Burial place: National Memorial Cemetery of the Pacific, Honolulu, Hawaii
- Military career
- Allegiance: United States of America
- Branch: United States Army
- Service years: 1941–1945
- Rank: Private First Class
- Unit: 100th Infantry Battalion
- Conflicts: World War II
- Awards: Medal of Honor; Bronze Star; Purple Heart; Croce di Guerra al Valor Militare

Kaoru Moto (Japanese: 茂戸 薫, April 25, 1917 – August 26, 1992) was a United States Army soldier. He was posthumously awarded the United States military's highest decoration—the Medal of Honor—for his actions in World War II.

== Early life ==
Moto was born in Hawaii to Japanese immigrant parents. He is a Nisei, which means that he is a second generation Japanese-American.

== Soldier ==
Ten months before the Japanese attack on Pearl Harbor, he joined the US Army in March 1941.

Moto volunteered to be part of the all-Nisei 100th Infantry Battalion. This army unit was mostly made up of Japanese Americans from Hawaii.

On July 7, 1944, Moto was serving as a private first class in the 100th Infantry Battalion. On that day, near Castellina Marittima, Italy, he single-handedly silenced two enemy machine gun positions while acting as a scout, and then destroyed a third despite being seriously wounded. For his actions in battle, he was awarded the Army's second-highest decoration, the Distinguished Service Cross.

Moto left the Army while still a private first class. He died at age 75 and was buried at the National Memorial Cemetery of the Pacific in Honolulu, Hawaii.

A 1990s review of service records for Asian Americans who received the Distinguished Service Cross during World War II led to Moto's award being upgraded to the Medal of Honor. In a ceremony at the White House on June 21, 2000, his surviving family was presented with his Medal of Honor by President Bill Clinton. Twenty-one other Asian Americans also received the medal during the ceremony, all but seven of them posthumously.

== Medal of Honor recipient ==
Moto's official Medal of Honor citation reads:

Private First Class Kaoru Moto distinguished himself by extraordinary heroism in action on 7 July 1944, near Castellina, Italy. While serving as first scout, Private First Class Moto observed a machine gun nest that was hindering his platoon's progress. On his own initiative, he made his way to a point ten paces from the hostile position, and killed the enemy machine gunner. Immediately, the enemy assistant gunner opened fire in the direction of Private First Class Moto. Crawling to the rear of the position, Private First Class Moto surprised the enemy soldier, who quickly surrendered. Taking his prisoner with him, Private First Class Moto took a position a few yards from a house to prevent the enemy from using the building as an observation post. While guarding the house and his prisoner, he observed an enemy machine gun team moving into position. He engaged them, and with deadly fire forced the enemy to withdraw. An enemy sniper located in another house fired at Private First Class Moto, severely wounding him. Applying first aid to his wound, he changed position to elude the sniper fire and to advance. Finally relieved of his position, he made his way to the rear for treatment. Crossing a road, he spotted an enemy machine gun nest. Opening fire, he wounded two of the three soldiers occupying the position. Not satisfied with this accomplishment, he then crawled forward to a better position and ordered the enemy soldier to surrender. Receiving no answer, Private First Class Moto fired at the position, and the soldiers surrendered. Private First Class Moto's extraordinary heroism and devotion to duty are in keeping with the highest traditions of military service and reflect great credit on him, his unit, and the United States Army.

== Awards and decorations ==

Badge	Combat Infantryman Badge		
1st row	Medal of Honor	Bronze Star Medal	Purple Heart
2nd row	Army Good Conduct Medal	American Defense Service Medal with Overseas Service Bar	American Campaign Medal
3rd row	Asiatic-Pacific Campaign Medal with 1 Campaign star	European–African–Middle Eastern Campaign Medal with 2 Campaign stars	World War II Victory Medal
Unit awards	Presidential Unit Citation with 1 Oak leaf cluster		

War Cross of Military Valor

== See also ==
- List of Asian American Medal of Honor recipients
- List of Medal of Honor recipients for World War II
