= Frank H. Ono =

United States Army Medal of Honor recipient

Frank Harry Ono
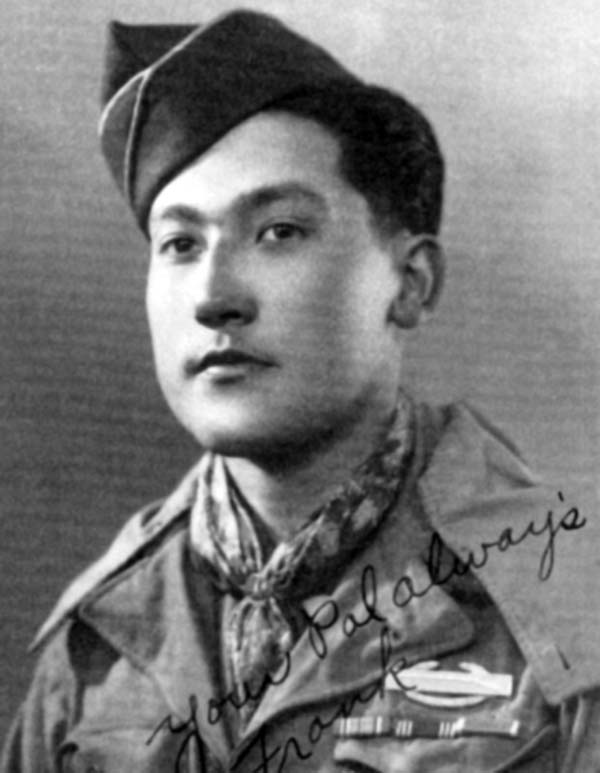
- Private First Class Frank Ono
- Born: June 5, 1923; Delta, Colorado, U.S.
- Died: May 6, 1980 (aged 56)
- Burial place: Highland Cemetery, North Judson, Indiana
- Military career
- Allegiance: United States of America
- Branch: United States Army
- Service years: 1943 - 1945
- Rank: Private First Class
- Unit: 442nd Regimental Combat Team
- Conflicts: World War II
- Awards: Medal of Honor; Purple Heart

Frank Harry Ono (Japanese surname: 大野, June 5, 1923 – May 6, 1980) was a United States Army soldier during World War II. He received the Distinguished Service Cross which was later upgraded to the Medal of Honor, the U.S. Army's highest decoration.

== Early life ==
Ono was born in Delta, Colorado. His father was an immigrant from Japan while his mother was from Ireland. He was a Nisei, which means that he was a second generation Japanese-American.

== Soldier ==
Ono joined the US Army in September 1943.

He volunteered to be part of the all-Nisei 442nd Regimental Combat Team. This army unit was mostly made up of Japanese Americans from Hawaii and the mainland.

During a battle on July 4, 1944, near Castellina Marittima, Italy, Ono advanced ahead of his unit and single-handedly defended his position against an enemy counter-attack. He then braved intense hostile fire to aid two wounded comrades and, when it became necessary to retreat, voluntarily covered his unit's withdrawal. For his actions during the battle, he was awarded the Army's second-highest decoration, the Distinguished Service Cross.

Ono left the Army while still a private first class.

He died at age 56 and was buried in Highland Cemetery, North Judson, Indiana.

A 1990s review of service records for Asian Americans who received the Distinguished Service Cross during World War II led to Ono's award being upgraded to the Medal of Honor. In a ceremony at the White House on June 21, 2000, his surviving family was presented with his Medal of Honor by President Bill Clinton. Twenty-one other Asian Americans also received the medal during the ceremony, all but seven of them posthumously.

== Medal of Honor citation ==
Private First Class Ono's official Medal of Honor citation reads:

Private First Class Frank H. Ono distinguished himself by extraordinary heroism in action on 4 July 1944, near Castellina, Italy. In attacking a heavily defended hill, Private First Class Ono's squad was caught in a hail of formidable fire from the well-entrenched enemy. Private First Class Ono opened fire with his automatic rifle and silenced one machine gun 300 hundred yards to the right front. Advancing through incessant fire, he killed a sniper with another burst of fire, and while his squad leader reorganized the rest of the platoon in the rear, he alone defended the critical position. His weapon was then wrenched from his grasp by a burst of enemy machine pistol fire as enemy troops attempted to close in on him. Hurling hand grenades, Private First Class Ono forced the enemy to abandon the attempt, resolutely defending the newly won ground until the rest of the platoon moved forward. Taking a wounded comrade's rifle, Private First Class Ono again joined in the assault. After killing two more enemy soldiers, he boldly ran through withering automatic, small arms, and mortar fire to render first aid to his platoon leader and a seriously wounded rifleman. In danger of being encircled, the platoon was ordered to withdraw. Volunteering to cover the platoon, Private First Class Ono occupied virtually unprotected positions near the crest of the hill, engaging an enemy machine gun emplaced on an adjoining ridge and exchanging fire with snipers armed with machine pistols. Completely disregarding his own safety, he made himself the constant target of concentrated enemy fire until the platoon reached the comparative safety of a draw. He then descended the hill in stages, firing his rifle, until he rejoined the platoon. Private First Class Ono's extraordinary heroism and devotion to duty are in keeping with the highest traditions of military service and reflect great credit on him, his unit, and the United States Army.

== Awards and decorations ==

Badge	Combat Infantryman Badge		
1st row	Medal of Honor Upgraded from Distinguished Service Cross		
2nd row	Bronze Star Medal	Purple Heart	Army Good Conduct Medal
3rd row	American Campaign Medal	European–African–Middle Eastern Campaign Medal with 1 Campaign star	World War II Victory Medal

== See also ==
- List of Asian American Medal of Honor recipients
- List of Medal of Honor recipients for World War II
