= Kiyoshi K. Muranaga =

United States Army Medal of Honor recipient

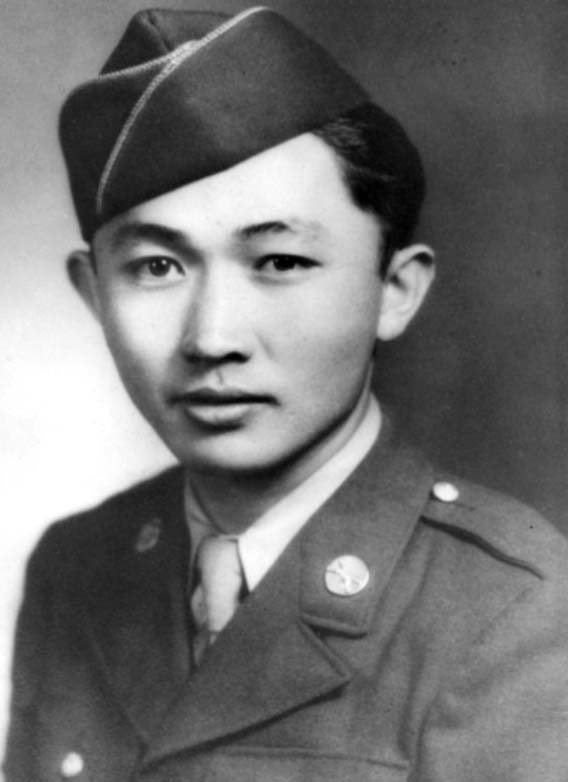
- Kiyoshi K. Muranaga, Medal of Honor recipient
- Born: February 16, 1922; Los Angeles, California
- Died: June 26, 1944 (aged 22) near Suvereto, Italy †
- Burial place: Evergreen Cemetery (Los Angeles, California)
- Military career
- Allegiance: United States of America
- Branch: United States Army
- Service years: 1943–1944
- Rank: Private First Class
- Unit: 442nd Regimental Combat Team
- Conflicts: World War II
- Awards: Medal of Honor; Purple Heart

Kiyoshi K. Muranaga (Japanese: 村永 清, February 16, 1922 – June 26, 1944) was a United States Army soldier and a recipient of the United States military's highest decoration—the Medal of Honor—for his actions in World War II.

== Early life ==
Muranaga was born in California to Japanese immigrant parents. He is a Nisei, which means that he is a second generation Japanese-American. He was raised as one of the oldest of 9 other siblings in what is now Gardena, California.

He was interned with his family at the Granada War Relocation Center in Colorado following the signing of Executive Order 9066.

== Soldier ==
Muranaga joined the US Army in May 1943.

Muranaga volunteered to be part of the all-Nisei 442nd Regimental Combat Team. This army unit was mostly made up of Japanese Americans from Hawaii and the mainland. Muranaga was killed on the first day of action for the 442nd in Italy.

For his actions in June 1944, he was posthumously awarded the Army's second-highest decoration, the Distinguished Service Cross. A 1990s review of service records for Asian Americans who received the Distinguished Service Cross during World War II led to Muranaga's award being upgraded to the Medal of Honor. In a ceremony at the White House on June 21, 2000, his surviving family was presented with his Medal of Honor by President Bill Clinton. Twenty-one other Asian Americans also received the medal during the ceremony, all but seven of them posthumously.

Muranaga, aged 22 at his death, was buried in Evergreen Cemetery, Los Angeles, California.

Muranaga's brothers were also soldiers. Kenichi (1924–2009) and Yoshio (1923–2008) also were in the 442nd. The youngest brother Tomi (born 1935) was a soldier in Korea.

== Medal of Honor citation ==
Muranaga's Medal of Honor recognized his conduct in frontline fighting in central Italy in 1944.

On June 26, 1944, Muranaga was serving as a private first class in the 442nd Regimental Combat Team. On that day, near Suvereto, Italy, he single-handedly manned his squad's mortar in an exposed position in an attempt to destroy an enemy self-propelled gun that was firing on his company. Muranaga fired three shells before being killed by the enemy's return fire, but his actions forced the enemy vehicle to retreat.

Private First Class Muranaga's official Medal of Honor citation reads:

Private First Class Kiyoshi K. Muranaga distinguished himself by extraordinary heroism in action on 26 June 1944, near Suvereto, Italy. Private First Class Muranaga's company encountered a strong enemy force in commanding positions and with superior firepower. An enemy 88mm self-propelled gun opened direct fire on the company, causing the men to disperse and seek cover. Private First Class Muranaga's mortar squad was ordered to action, but the terrain made it impossible to set up their weapons. The squad leader, realizing the vulnerability of the mortar position, moved his men away from the gun to positions of relative safety. Because of the heavy casualties being inflicted on his company, Private First Class Muranaga, who served as a gunner, attempted to neutralize the 88mm weapon alone. Voluntarily remaining at his gun position, Private First Class Muranaga manned the mortar himself and opened fire on the enemy gun at a range of approximately 400 yards. With his third round, he was able to correct his fire so that the shell landed directly in front of the enemy gun. Meanwhile, the enemy crew, immediately aware of the source of mortar fire, turned their 88mm weapon directly on Private First Class Muranaga's position. Before Private First Class Muranaga could fire a fourth round, an 88mm shell scored a direct hit on his position, killing him instantly. Because of the accuracy of Private First Class Muranaga's previous fire, the enemy soldiers decided not to risk further exposure and immediately abandoned their position. Private First Class Muranaga's extraordinary heroism and devotion to duty are in keeping with the highest traditions of military service and reflect great credit on him, his unit, and the United States Army.

== Awards and decorations ==

Badge	Combat Infantryman Badge		
1st row	Medal of Honor		
2nd row	Bronze Star Medal	Purple Heart	Army Good Conduct Medal
3rd row	American Campaign Medal	European–African–Middle Eastern Campaign Medal with 1 Campaign star	World War II Victory Medal

== See also ==
- List of Asian American Medal of Honor recipients
- List of Medal of Honor recipients for World War II
