= Shinyei Nakamine =

United States Army Medal of Honor recipient

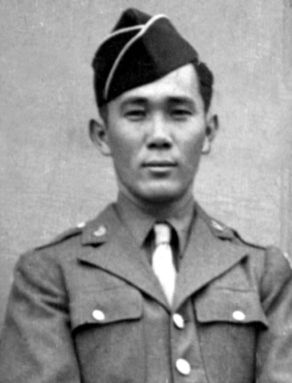
- Pvt. Shinyei Nakamine
- Born: January 21, 1920; Waianae, Oahu, Territory of Hawaii (now Hawaii)
- Died: June 2, 1944 (aged 24); La Torreto, Italy
- Burial place: National Memorial Cemetery of the Pacific, Honolulu, Hawaii
- Military career
- Allegiance: United States of America
- Branch: United States Army
- Service years: 1941 - 1944
- Rank: Private
- Unit: 100th Infantry Battalion
- Conflicts: World War II
- Awards: Medal of Honor, Purple Heart

Shinyei Nakamine (Japanese: 仲嶺 真栄, January 21, 1920 – June 2, 1944) was a United States Army soldier. He is best known for receiving the Medal of Honor because of his actions in World War II.

== Early life ==
Nakamine was born in Hawaii to Okinawan immigrant parents. He was a Nisei, which means that he is a second generation Japanese-American.

== Soldier ==
One month before the Japanese attack on Pearl Harbor, Nakamine joined the US Army in November 1941.

Nakamine volunteered to be part of the all-Nisei 100th Infantry Battalion. This army unit was mostly made up of Japanese Americans from Hawaii.

For his actions in June 1944, Nakamine was awarded the Army's second-highest decoration, the Distinguished Service Cross.

== Medal of Honor citation ==
Nakamine received the medal for advancing on enemy forces when his own unit was pinned down. He was subsequently killed during this engagement and was awarded the Distinguished Service Cross which was eventually upgraded to the Medal of Honor upon military review in June 2000.

Rank and organization: Private, U.S. Army, Company B, 100th Infantry Battalion (Separate). Place and date: La Torreto, Italy, June 2, 1944. Entered service at: Honolulu, Hawaii. Born: January 21, 1920, Waianae, Oahu

Citation:

Private Shinyei Nakamine distinguished himself by extraordinary heroism in action on 2 June 1944, near La Torreto, Italy. During an attack, Private Nakamine's platoon became pinned down by intense machine gun crossfire from a small knoll 200 yards to the front. On his own initiative, Private Nakamine crawled toward one of the hostile weapons. Reaching a point 25 yards from the enemy, he charged the machine gun nest, firing his submachine gun, and killed three enemy soldiers and captured two. Later that afternoon, Private Nakamine discovered an enemy soldier on the right flank of his platoon's position. Crawling 25 yards from his position, Private Nakamine opened fire and killed the soldier. Then, seeing a machine gun nest to his front approximately 75 yards away, he returned to his platoon and led an automatic rifle team toward the enemy. Under covering fire from his team, Private Nakamine crawled to a point 25 yards from the nest and threw hand grenades at the enemy soldiers, wounding one and capturing four. Spotting another machine gun nest 100 yards to his right flank, he led the automatic rifle team toward the hostile position but was killed by a burst of machine gun fire. Private Nakamine's extraordinary heroism and devotion to duty are in keeping with the highest traditions of military service and reflect great credit on him, his unit, and the United States Army.

== Awards and decorations ==

Badge	Combat Infantryman Badge		
1st row	Medal of Honor		
2nd row	Medal of Honor	Bronze Star Medal	Purple Heart
3rd row	Army Good Conduct Medal	American Defense Service Medal with Overseas Service Clasp	American Campaign Medal
3rd row	Asiatic-Pacific Campaign Medal with 1 Campaign star	European–African–Middle Eastern Campaign Medal with 1 Campaign star	World War II Victory Medal

== See also ==
- List of Asian American Medal of Honor recipients
- List of Medal of Honor recipients for World War II
- 442nd Regimental Combat Team
