= Yeiki Kobashigawa =

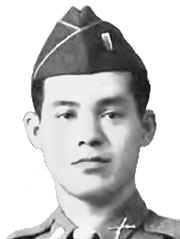
- Yeiki Kobashigawa
- Born: September 28, 1917; Hilo, Territory of Hawaii
- Died: March 31, 2005 (aged 87); Waianae, Hawaii
- Burial place: National Memorial Cemetery of the Pacific
- Military career
- Allegiance: United States
- Branch: United States Army
- Service years: 1941–1945
- Rank: Second Lieutenant
- Units: Company F, 100th Infantry Battalion
- Conflicts: World War II
- Awards: Medal of Honor; Bronze Star Medal; Purple Heart (2)
- Other work: Maintenance mechanic

Yeiki Kobashigawa (Japanese: 小橋川 栄喜, September 28, 1917 – March 31, 2005) was a soldier in United States Army. He is best known for receiving the Medal of Honor in World War II.

== Early life ==
Kobashigawa was born in Hilo, Hawaii, on September 28, 1917. He is the son of immigrants who were born in Okinawa, Japan. He is a second generation Ryukyuan-American.

== World War II ==
One month before the Japanese attack on Pearl Harbor, Kobashigawa joined the United States Army in November 1941.

Kobashigawa volunteered to join the all-Nisei 100th Infantry Battalion. This army unit was mostly made up of Japanese Americans from Hawaii.

For his actions in June 1944, Kobashigawa was awarded the Distinguished Service Cross. He led his squad in destroying several German machine gun nests. This was eventually upgraded to the Medal of Honor upon military review on June 21, 2000. The review examined whether or not Asian Americans who fought in uniform during the war were treated unfairly due to prejudice. Twenty-two Americans of Asian ancestry who had fought in World War II were awarded the Medal after the review. Kobashigawa was one of only a handful still alive in 2000 to receive the Medal during a White House ceremony. After the war, Kobashigawa worked as a maintenance mechanic.

Kobashigawa died March 31, 2005, and is buried in National Memorial Cemetery of the Pacific, Honolulu, Hawaii. His grave can be found in the Columbarium Section CT8-E, Row 500, Site 536.

== Medal of Honor citation ==
Citation:

Technical Sergeant Yeiki Kobashigawa distinguished himself by extraordinary heroism in action on 2 June 1944, in the vicinity of Lanuvio, Italy. During an attack, Technical Sergeant Kobashigawa's platoon encountered strong enemy resistance from a series of machine guns providing supporting fire. Observing a machine gun nest 50 yards from his position, Technical Sergeant Kobashigawa crawled forward with one of his men, threw a grenade and then charged the enemy with his submachine gun while a fellow soldier provided covering fire. He killed one enemy soldier and captured two prisoners. Meanwhile, Technical Sergeant Kobashigawa and his comrade were fired upon by another machine gun 50 yards ahead. Directing a squad to advance to his first position, Technical Sergeant Kobashigawa again moved forward with a fellow soldier to subdue the second machine gun nest. After throwing grenades into the position, Technical Sergeant Kobashigawa provided close supporting fire while a fellow soldier charged, capturing four prisoners. On the alert for other machine gun nests, Technical Sergeant Kobashigawa discovered four more, and skillfully led a squad in neutralizing two of them. Technical Sergeant Kobashigawa's extraordinary heroism and devotion to duty are in keeping with the highest traditions of military service and reflect great credit on him, his unit, and the United States Army.

== Awards and decorations ==

Badge	Combat Infantryman Badge		
1st row	Medal of Honor	Bronze Star Medal	Purple Heart with oak leaf cluster
2nd row	Army Good Conduct Medal	American Defense Service Medal with 'Base Clasp'	American Campaign Medal
3rd row	Asiatic-Pacific Campaign Medal with one campaign star	European–African–Middle Eastern Campaign Medal with three campaign stars	World War II Victory Medal
Unit awards	Presidential Unit Citation		

== See also ==
- List of Asian American Medal of Honor recipients
- List of Medal of Honor recipients for World War II
