= Shizuya Hayashi =

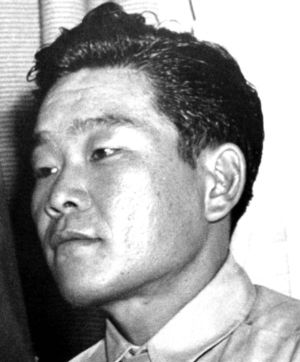
- Shizuya Hayashi
- Born: November 28, 1917; Waialua, Oahu, Hawaii
- Died: March 12, 2008 (aged 90); Honolulu, Oahu, Hawaii
- Burial place: National Cemetery of the Pacific, Oahu, Hawaii
- Military career
- Allegiance: United States of America
- Branch: United States Army
- Service years: 1941 – 1945
- Rank: Private
- Nickname: Cesar
- Unit: 100th Infantry Battalion
- Conflicts: World War II
- Awards: Medal of Honor; Distinguished Service Cross

Shizuya Hayashi (Japanese: 林 静也, November 28, 1917 – March 12, 2008) was a soldier in the 100th Infantry Battalion of the United States Army. He received the Medal of Honor for actions in Cerasuolo, Italy during World War II.

== Early life ==
Hayashi was born in Waialua, Hawaii. He is the son of immigrants who were born in Japan. He is a Nisei, which means that he is a second generation Japanese-American.

== Soldier ==
Nine months before the Japanese attack on Pearl Harbor, Hayashi was drafted into the US Army in March 1941. He was given the nickname "Cesar" because his sergeant could not pronounce his name.

Hayashi volunteered to be part of the all-Nisei 100th Infantry Battalion. This army unit was mostly made up of Japanese Americans from Hawaii.

For his actions in November 1943, Hayashi was awarded the Army's second-highest decoration, the Distinguished Service Cross.

== Medal of Honor citation ==
Hayashi's Medal of Honor recognized his conduct in frontline fighting in central Italy in 1943.

He distinguished himself by taking over a German position despite superior numbers. Hayashi was originally awarded the Distinguished Service Cross which was upgraded to the Medal of Honor upon military review in June 2000. The review was conducted on the belief that racial discrimination prevented Hayashi and several other soldiers of Asian descent from being awarded the United States' highest decoration for valor. Twenty one other soldiers also received the Medal based on the review. Hayashi was one of 12 who were still alive when the Medal was eventually awarded. Since being recognized with the Medal, Hayashi has been a guest speaker at various events including being an honored guest at the United States Army Southern European Task Force.

Hayashi, Shizuya
Rank and organization:Private, U.S. Army, Company A, 100th Infantry Battalion (Separate)
Place and date:Cerasuolo, Italy, November 29, 1943
Entered service at:Schofield Barracks, Hawaii
Born:November 28, 1917, Waiakea, Hawaii
Citation:

Private Shizuya Hayashi distinguished himself by extraordinary heroism in action on 29 November 1943, near Cerasuolo, Italy. During a flank assault on high ground held by the enemy, Private Hayashi rose alone in the face of grenade, rifle, and machine gun fire. Firing his automatic rifle from the hip, he charged and overtook an enemy machine gun position, killing seven men in the nest and two more as they fled. After his platoon advanced 200 yards from this point, an enemy antiaircraft gun opened fire on the men. Private Hayashi returned fire at the hostile position, killing nine of the enemy, taking four prisoners, and forcing the remainder of the force to withdraw from the hill. Private Hayashi's extraordinary heroism and devotion to duty are in keeping with the highest traditions of military service and reflect great credit on him, his unit, and the United States Army.

== Awards and decorations ==

Badge	Combat Infantryman Badge		
1st row	Medal of Honor	Bronze Star Medal	Army Good Conduct Medal
2nd row	American Campaign Medal	European–African–Middle Eastern Campaign Medal with arrowhead and three campaign stars	World War II Victory Medal
Unit awards	Presidential Unit Citation		

== See also ==
- List of Asian American Medal of Honor recipients
- List of Medal of Honor recipients for World War II
- 442nd Regimental Combat Team
