= Kazuo Otani =

United States Army soldier (1918–1944)

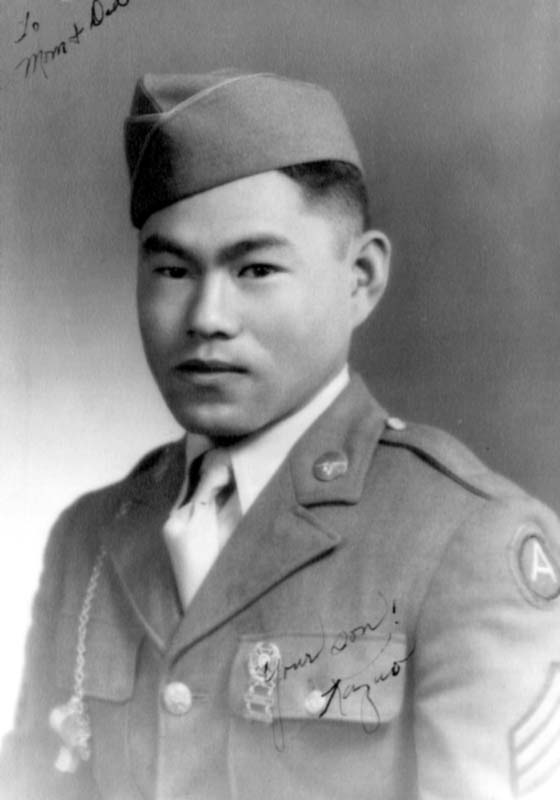
- Born: June 2, 1918; Visalia, California
- Died: July 15, 1944 (aged 26) near Pieve di Santa Luce, Italy
- Burial place: Veterans Liberty Cemetery, Fresno, California
- Military career
- Allegiance: United States of America
- Branch: United States Army
- Service years: 1942–1944
- Rank: Staff Sergeant
- Unit: 442nd Regimental Combat Team
- Conflicts: World War II
- Awards: Medal of Honor

Kazuo Otani (大谷 一雄; June 2, 1918 – July 15, 1944) was a United States Army soldier and a recipient of the United States military's highest decoration—the Medal of Honor—for his actions in World War II.

== Early life ==
Otani was born in California. His parents were immigrants from Japan. He was a Nisei, which means that he was a second generation Japanese-American.

Otani's family was interned at the Gila River War Relocation Center in Arizona following enforcement of Executive Order 9066.

== Soldier ==
Otani joined the US Army in February 1942, and volunteered to be part of the all-Nisei 442nd Regimental Combat Team. This army unit was mostly made up of Japanese Americans from Hawaii and the mainland.

On July 15, 1944, Otani was serving as a staff sergeant in Company G of the all volunteer Japanese American 442nd Regimental Combat Team. On that day, near Pieve di Santa Luce, Italy, his platoon became pinned down in a field by an enemy machine gun and snipers. After killing one sniper, Otani shouted directions to his platoon and repeatedly exposed himself to the hostile fire, creating a distraction which allowed some of his men to reach cover. He then crawled to a wounded soldier who was lying in an exposed position and began rendering medical aid, but was killed by enemy fire in the process.

For his actions in July 1944, Otani was awarded the Army's second-highest decoration, the Distinguished Service Cross (DSC).

Otani, aged 26 at his death, was buried in Veterans Liberty Cemetery, Fresno, California.

In the 1990s, there was a review of service records of Asian Americans who received the DSC during World War II. Otani's award was upgraded to the Medal of Honor. In a ceremony at the White House on June 21, 2000, his family was presented with his medal by President Bill Clinton. Twenty-one other Asian Americans also received the medal during the ceremony, but only seven of them were still alive.

== Medal of Honor citation ==
Staff Sergeant Otani's official Medal of Honor citation reads:

Staff Sergeant Kazuo Otani distinguished himself by extraordinary heroism in action on 15 July 1944, near Pieve Di S. Luce, Italy. Advancing to attack a hill objective, Staff Sergeant Otani's platoon became pinned down in a wheat field by concentrated fire from enemy machine gun and sniper positions. Realizing the danger confronting his platoon, Staff Sergeant Otani left his cover and shot and killed a sniper who was firing with deadly effect upon the platoon. Followed by a steady stream of machine gun bullets, Staff Sergeant Otani then dashed across the open wheat field toward the foot of a cliff, and directed his men to crawl to the cover of the cliff. When the movement of the platoon drew heavy enemy fire, he dashed along the cliff toward the left flank, exposing himself to enemy fire. By attracting the attention of the enemy, he enabled the men closest to the cliff to reach cover. Organizing these men to guard against possible enemy counterattack, Staff Sergeant Otani again made his way across the open field, shouting instructions to the stranded men while continuing to draw enemy fire. Reaching the rear of the platoon position, he took partial cover in a shallow ditch and directed covering fire for the men who had begun to move forward. At this point, one of his men became seriously wounded. Ordering his men to remain under cover, Staff Sergeant Otani crawled to the wounded soldier who was lying on open ground in full view of the enemy. Dragging the wounded soldier to a shallow ditch, Staff Sergeant Otani proceeded to render first aid treatment, but was mortally wounded by machine gun fire. Staff Sergeant Otani's extraordinary heroism and devotion to duty are in keeping with the highest traditions of military service and reflect great credit on him, his unit, and the United States Army.

== Awards and decorations ==

| Badge | Combat Infantryman Badge | | |
| 1st row | Medal of Honor Upgraded from Distinguished Service Cross | | |
| 2nd row | Bronze Star Medal | Purple Heart | Army Good Conduct Medal |
| 3rd row | American Campaign Medal | European–African–Middle Eastern Campaign Medal with 1 Campaign star | World War II Victory Medal |

== See also ==
- List of Asian American Medal of Honor recipients
- List of Medal of Honor recipients for World War II
