= George T. Sakato =

George Taro Sakato
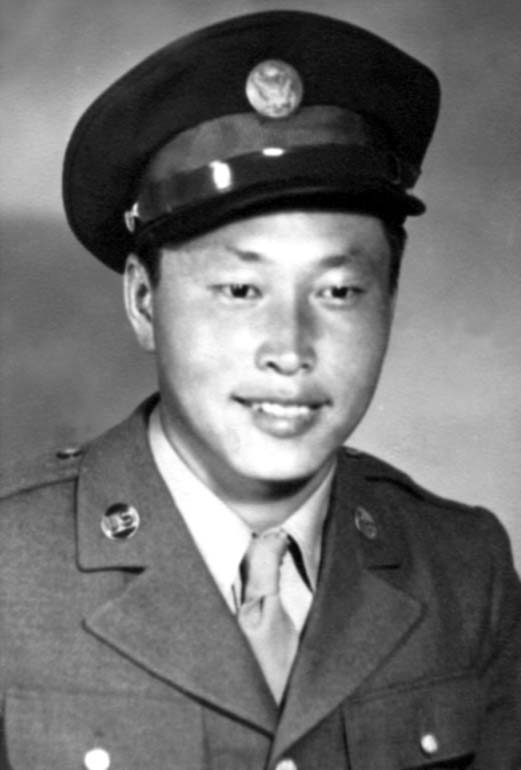
- Private George Sakato, US Army
- Born: George Taro Sakato; February 19, 1921; Colton, California
- Died: December 2, 2015 (aged 94); Denver, Colorado
- Burial place: Fairmount Cemetery, Denver, Colorado
- Military career
- Allegiance: United States
- Branch: United States Army
- Service years: 1944–1945
- Rank: Private
- Nickname: Joe
- Units: Company E, 2nd Battalion, 442nd Regimental Combat Team
- Conflicts: World War II
- Awards: Medal of Honor; Bronze Star; Presidential Unit Citation Emblem; Good Conduct Medal; American Campaign Medal; European-African-Middle Eastern Campaign Medal; World War II Victory Medal; Combat Infantryman Badge

George Taro Sakato (Japanese: 坂戸 太郎, February 19, 1921 – December 2, 2015) was an American combat soldier of World War II who received the Medal of Honor, the nation's highest military award for valor.

== Biography ==
Sakato was born in Colton, California. He was a Nisei, which means that he was a second generation born American citizen of Japanese descent. He graduated from Redlands High School in Redlands, California.

The Sakato family moved to Arizona during World War II to avoid internment.

=== World War II ===
Sakato joined the US Army in March 1944.

He volunteered to be part of the all-Nisei 442nd Regimental Combat Team and was assigned to 3rd platoon, Company E, 2nd Battalion. The US Army unit was mostly made up of Americans of Japanese descent from Hawaii and the mainland.

Sakato was awarded the Distinguished Service Cross (DSC) for extraordinary heroism on October 29, 1944, in France.

=== Post World War II ===
In the 1990s, there was a review of US military service records of Americans of Asian descent who received the DSC during World War II. Sakato's award was upgraded to the Medal of Honor. President Bill Clinton presented Sakato the Medal of Honor during a ceremony at the White House on June 21, 2000. Twenty-one other American servicemen of World War II of Asian descent also were presented the Medal of Honor during the ceremony, but only seven were living recipients. Sakato died in the evening of December 2, 2015 in Denver, Colorado, at the age of 94.

== Medal of Honor citation ==
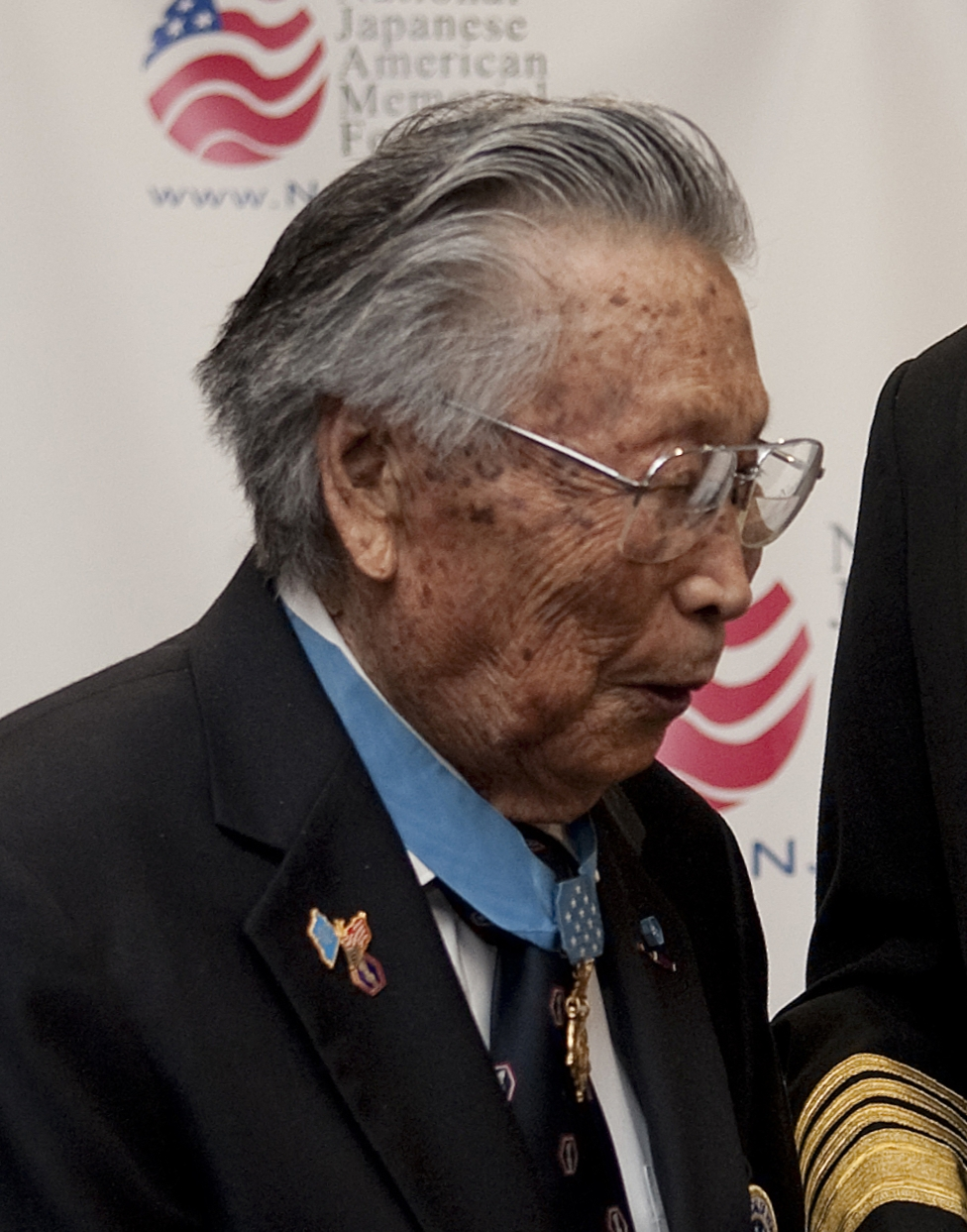
Sakato in 2009

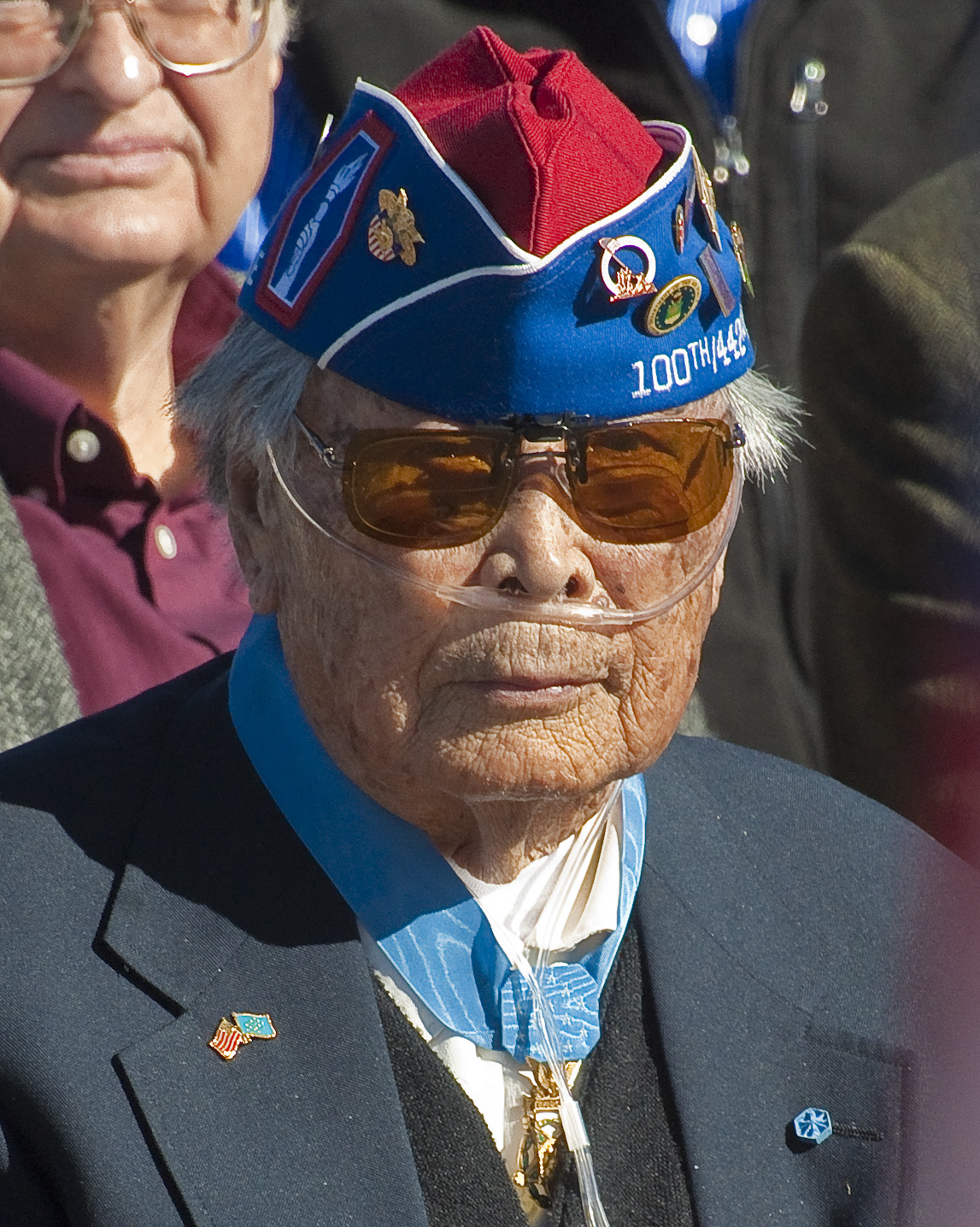
George Sakato in 2013

Sakato's Medal of Honor recognized his heroic conduct in frontline fighting in northern France in 1944. He charged an enemy stronghold, and then took command of his platoon and led it in defense of the position.

CITATION:

Private George T. Sakato distinguished himself by extraordinary heroism in action on 29 October 1944, on hill 617 in the vicinity of Biffontaine, France. After his platoon had virtually destroyed two enemy defense lines, during which he personally killed five enemy soldiers and captured four, his unit was pinned down by heavy enemy fire. Disregarding the enemy fire, Private Sakato made a one-man rush that encouraged his platoon to charge and destroy the enemy strongpoint. While his platoon was reorganizing, he proved to be the inspiration of his squad in halting a counter-attack on the left flank during which his squad leader was killed. Taking charge of the squad, he continued his relentless tactics, using an enemy rifle and P-38 pistol to stop an organized enemy attack. During this entire action, he killed 12 and wounded two, personally captured four and assisted his platoon in taking 34 prisoners. By continuously ignoring enemy fire, and by his gallant courage and fighting spirit, he turned impending defeat into victory and helped his platoon complete its mission. Private Sakato's extraordinary heroism and devotion to duty are in keeping with the highest traditions of military service and reflect great credit on him, his unit, and the United States Army.

== Awards and Decorations ==

Badge	Combat Infantryman Badge		
1st row	Medal of Honor Upgraded from DSC, 2001		
2nd row	Bronze Star Medal Retroactively Awarded, 1947	Purple Heart	Army Good Conduct Medal
3rd row	American Campaign Medal	European–African–Middle Eastern Campaign Medal with 1 Campaign star	World War II Victory Medal
Unit awards	Presidential Unit Citation		

442nd Regimental Combat Team Insignia

== See also ==
- List of Medal of Honor recipients for World War II
- List of Asian American Medal of Honor recipients
