= Sadao Munemori =

US soldier and Medal of Honor recipient

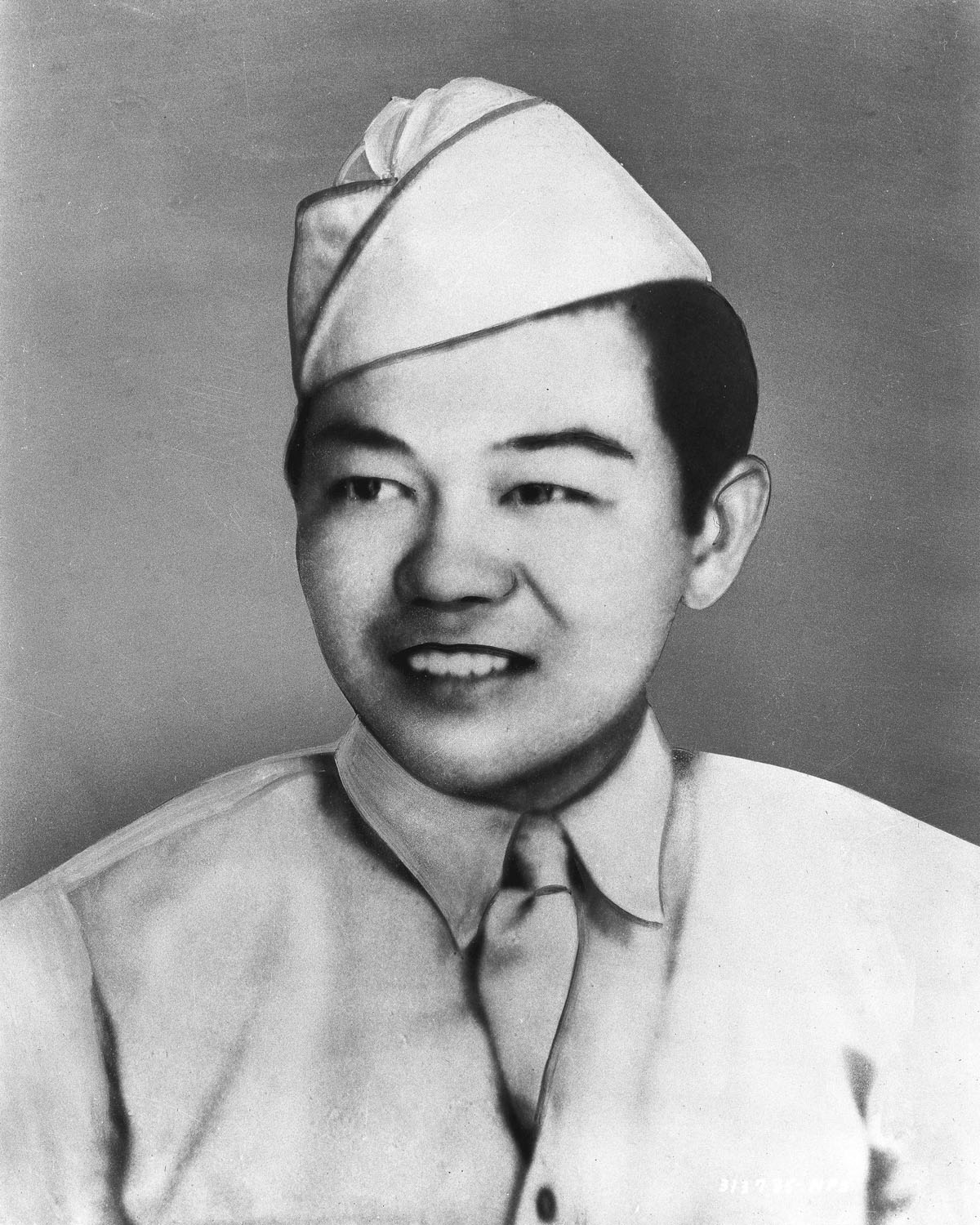
- Born: August 17, 1922; Los Angeles, California, U.S.
- Died: April 5, 1945 (aged 22); Killed in action at Seravezza, Italy
- Burial place: Evergreen Cemetery, Los Angeles, California, U.S.
- Military career
- Allegiance: United States of America
- Branch: United States Army
- Service years: 1942–1945
- Rank: Private First Class
- Nickname: Spud
- Units: US Army 100th Infantry Battalion
- Conflicts: World War II
- Awards: Medal of Honor

Sadao Munemori (Japanese: 旨森 貞夫, August 17, 1922 – April 5, 1945) was a United States Army soldier and posthumous recipient of the Medal of Honor, after he sacrificed his life to save those of his fellow soldiers at Seravezza, Italy during World War II.

Munemori was a private first class in the United States Army, in Company A, 100th Infantry Battalion, 442nd Regimental Combat Team. For his actions, when the 442nd was part of the 92d Infantry Division, he was the only Japanese American to be awarded the Medal of Honor during or immediately after World War II.

== Early life ==
Munemori was born in Los Angeles, California to Japanese immigrant parents Kametaro and Nawa Munemori. He was a Nisei, a second generation Japanese American. He grew up in the suburb of Glendale and graduated from Abraham Lincoln Senior High School in 1940 before becoming an auto mechanic.

== Soldier ==
Munemori had volunteered for the U.S. Army in November 1941, one month before the Japanese attack on Pearl Harbor, and he was inducted in February 1942. Along with all other Japanese American soldiers, he was soon after demoted to 4-C class, removed from combat training and assigned to menial labor. While he was transferred to a series of Midwestern and Southern army bases (eventually winding up at Camp Savage, Minnesota), his parents and siblings were incarcerated at Manzanar.

When Japanese American soldiers were allowed to reenter active service in March 1943, Munemori volunteered to be part of the all-Nisei 442nd Regimental Combat Team. This segregated army unit was made up entirely of Japanese Americans, with most initial recruits coming from Hawaii. The unit began as the 100th Infantry, initially listed as a separate battalion, and fought as part of the 133rd Infantry Regiment within the 34th Infantry Division. After the Allied capture of Rome, the battalion withdrew from the front and became the 1st Battalion of the 442nd RCT. Munemori was sent to Camp Shelby in January 1944 and, after completing his combat training three months later, joined the 100th Battalion in the European Theater. Fighting in Italy and France, he participated in the rescue of the Lost Battalion before arriving on the Gothic Line, where he was killed in action saving the lives of two of his comrades.

In 1990s, the awards issued to 442nd soldiers were reviewed after two studies revealed that racial discrimination had caused some to be overlooked, and twenty-one soldiers' Distinguished Service Crosses were upgraded to Medals of Honor.

== Awards and decorations ==
Sadao "Spud" Munemori received these awards during World War II:

Combat Infantryman Badge
Medal of Honor
Bronze Star Medal	Purple Heart	Army Good Conduct Medal
American Campaign Medal	European-African-Middle Eastern Campaign Medal with seven campaign stars	World War II Victory Medal

== Medal of Honor citation ==
Rank and organization: Private First Class, U.S. Army, Company A, 100th Infantry Battalion, 442d Combat Team. Place and date: Near Seravezza, Italy, 5 April 1945. Entered service at: Los Angeles, Calif Birth: Los Angeles, Calif. G.O. No.. 24, 7 March 1946.

"The President of the United States of America, in the name of Congress, takes pride in presenting the Medal of Honor (Posthumously) to Private First Class Sadao S. Munemori (ASN: 39019023), United States Army, for conspicuous gallantry and intrepidity in action above and beyond the call of duty while serving with Company A, 100th Infantry Battalion, 442d Regimental Combat Team, attached to the 92d Infantry Division, in action against the enemy on 5 April 1945. Private First Class Munemori fought with great gallantry and intrepidity near Seravezza, Italy. When his unit was pinned down by grazing fire from the enemy's strong mountain defense and command of the squad devolved on him with the wounding of its regular leader, he made frontal, one-man attacks through direct fire and knocked out two machine guns with grenades. Withdrawing under murderous fire and showers of grenades from other enemy emplacements, he had nearly reached a shell crater occupied by two of his men when an unexploded grenade bounced on his helmet and rolled toward his helpless comrades. He arose into the withering fire, dived for the grenade, and smothered its blast with his body. By his swift, supremely heroic action Private First Class Munemori saved two of his men at the cost of his own life and did much to clear the path for his company's victorious advance."

== Namesakes ==
- The interchange between the I-105 and I-405 freeways in Los Angeles is labeled the "Sadao S. Munemori Memorial Interchange."
- USAT Private Sadao S. Munemori is a reserved name in the U.S. Army, and was used as the name of a troop ship, USNS Private Sadao S. Munemori (T-AP-190), between October 31, 1947, and the 1970s.
- Sadao S. Munemori Hall, a building located on the grounds of the Captain Nelson M. Holderman U.S. Army Reserve Center in West Los Angeles, California, was dedicated in his honor in 1993.
- Sadao Munemori is memorialized by a statue in Pietrasanto Italy.
- American Legion Post 321 in Los Angeles is named for Sadao Munemori.
- Sadao S. Munemori Memorial Square. On September 19, 2023, the Glendale City Council honored Sadao S. Munemori by naming the intersection of Broadway and North Isabel Street in Glendale, California, right by City Hall, Sadao S. Munemori Memorial Square in his honor in recognition of how his bravery and sacrifice inspire Glendale residents to uphold values of service and community.

== See also ==
- List of Asian American Medal of Honor recipients
- List of Medal of Honor recipients for World War II
