= Barney F. Hajiro =

United States Army Medal of Honor recipient

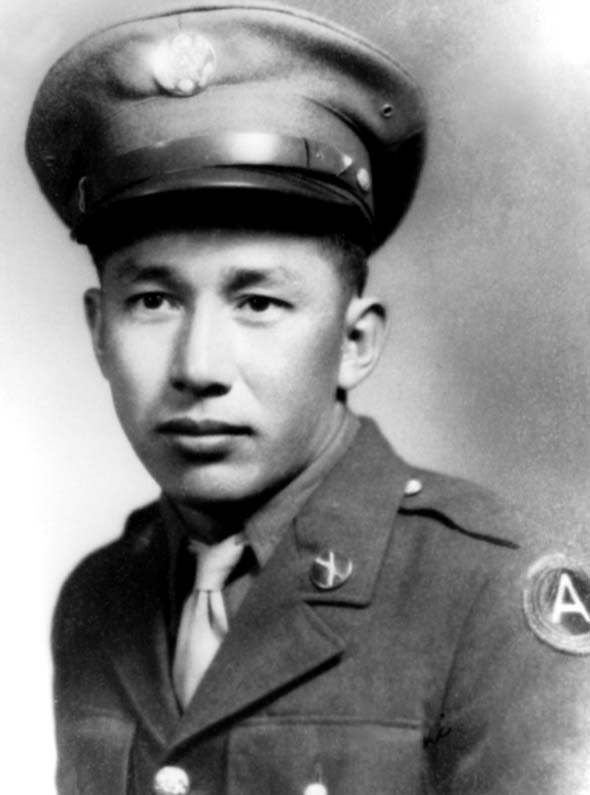
- Barney F. Hajiro, Medal of Honor recipient
- Born: September 16, 1916; Territory of Hawaii
- Died: January 21, 2011 (aged 94); Maunalani Care Home, Honolulu, Hawaii
- Burial place: National Memorial Cemetery of the Pacific
- Military career
- Allegiance: United States of America
- Branch: United States Army
- Service years: 1942 – 1945
- Rank: Private First Class
- Unit: 442nd Regimental Combat Team
- Conflicts: World War II
- Awards: Medal of Honor; Bronze Star; Purple Heart

Barney Fushimi Hajiro (Japanese: 羽白 二四三, September 16, 1916 – January 21, 2011) was an American combat veteran of World War II who received the Medal of Honor, the highest United States military award for valor.

== Biography ==
=== Early years ===
Hajiro was born in Hawaii, the second to the eldest of nine children born to Japanese immigrant parents His parents had moved from Hiroshima to Maui during World War I. Two of his siblings died in infancy. The family was poor, and Hajiro left school to work, first in the sugarcane fields of Maui and later as a stevedore in Honolulu.

=== U.S. Army ===
==== World War II ====
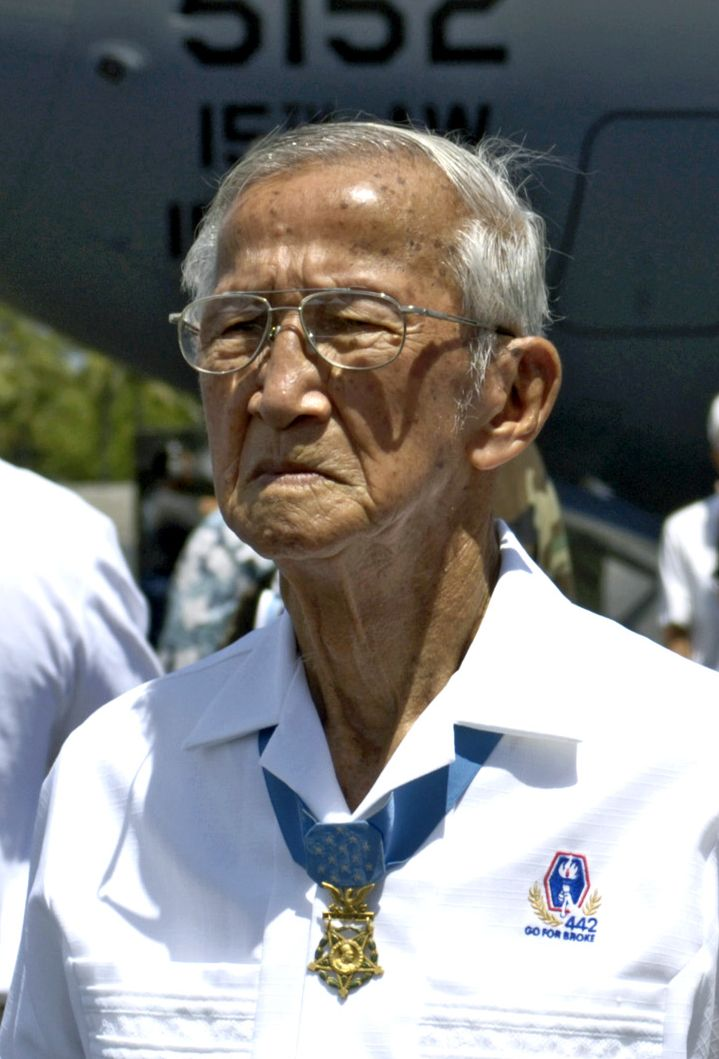
Hajiro in 2006

Two months after the Japanese attack on Pearl Harbor, he was drafted into the U.S. Army and performed menial labor as part of an engineering battalion.

In March 1943, Hajiro volunteered to be part of the Army's all-Nisei 442nd Regimental Combat Team. The 442nd was mostly made up of second-generation Americans citizens of Japanese descent from Hawaii and the mainland. The unit was sent to Europe and in May 1944 fought the Germans in Italy, north of Rome. From there the 442nd was redeployed to France.

On October 19, 1944, the 442nd was fighting near Bruyères and Biffontaine in eastern France and over the next ten days, Hajiro, a private in Company I, repeatedly distinguished himself in battle. He exposed himself to enemy fire while assisting an Allied attack on October 19, and three days later he and a comrade ambushed an 18-man enemy patrol. On October 29, during the rescue of the so-called "Lost Battalion", which had been surrounded by German forces in the Vosges Mountains, he single-handedly destroyed two German machine gun emplacements. Afterwards, in another firefight, he was shot in the shoulder and wrist leaving his left arm partially paralyzed. He was able to rejoin the 442nd in Monte Carlo, but was barred from further combat duty. He was then sent back to the United States to recover.

Hajiro was recommended for the Medal of Honor for his actions in October 1944. He received the Distinguished Service Cross and the World War II Victory Medal before he was honorably discharged.

=== Post-war and later years ===
In 1948, he was awarded the Military Medal by the British government. A 1990s review of U.S. military service records for personnel of Asian descent who had received the Distinguished Service Cross during World War II led to Hajiro's Distinguished Service Cross being upgraded to the Medal of Honor. President Bill Clinton presented Hajiro the Medal of Honor during a ceremony at the White House on June 21, 2000. Twenty-one other former U.S. military personnel of Asian descent also received the Medal of Honor during the ceremony, fifteen of them posthumously. In 2004, Hajiro became the first veteran of the 442nd Regiment to be awarded the French Legion of Honour.

=== Death ===
Hajiro was the oldest living WWII Medal of Honor recipient for seven months. He died on January 21, 2011, in Waipahu, Hawaii.

== Medal of Honor citation ==
Hajiro's official Medal of Honor citation reads:

Citation: For conspicuous gallantry and intrepidity at risk of his life above and beyond the call of duty. Private Barney F. Hajiro distinguished himself by extraordinary heroism in action on 19, 22, and October 29, 1944, in the vicinity of Bruyeres and Biffontaine, eastern France. Private Hajiro, while acting as a sentry on top of an embankment on October 19, 1944, in the vicinity of Bruyeres, France, rendered assistance to allied troops attacking a house 200 yards away by exposing himself to enemy fire and directing fire at an enemy strong point. He assisted the unit on his right by firing his automatic rifle and killing or wounding two enemy snipers. On October 22, 1944, he and one comrade took up an outpost security position about 50 yards to the right front of their platoon, concealed themselves, and ambushed an 18-man, heavily armed, enemy patrol, killing two, wounding one, and taking the remainder as prisoners. On October 29, 1944, in a wooded area in the vicinity of Biffontaine, France, Private Hajiro initiated an attack up the slope of a hill referred to as "Suicide Hill" by running forward approximately 100 yards under fire. He then advanced ahead of his comrades about 10 yards, drawing fire and spotting camouflaged machine gun nests. He fearlessly met fire with fire and single-handedly destroyed two machine gun nests and killed two enemy snipers. As a result of Private Hajiro's heroic actions, the attack was successful. Private Hajiro's extraordinary heroism and devotion to duty are in keeping with the highest traditions of military service and reflect great credit upon him, his unit, and the United States Army.

== Military decorations and awards ==
Hajiro's military awards include:

Badge	Combat Infantryman Badge		
1st row	Medal of Honor		
2nd row	Bronze Star Medal	Purple Heart	Army Good Conduct Medal
3rd row	American Campaign Medal	European–African–Middle Eastern Campaign Medal with 1 campaign star	World War II Victory Medal

Foreign Awards

1st row	British Military Medal	Legion of Honor	French Liberation Medal

== See also ==
- List of Asian American Medal of Honor recipients
- List of Medal of Honor recipients for World War II
