= Dennis Fujii =

Retired United States Army Medal of Honor recipient

Dennis M. Fujii
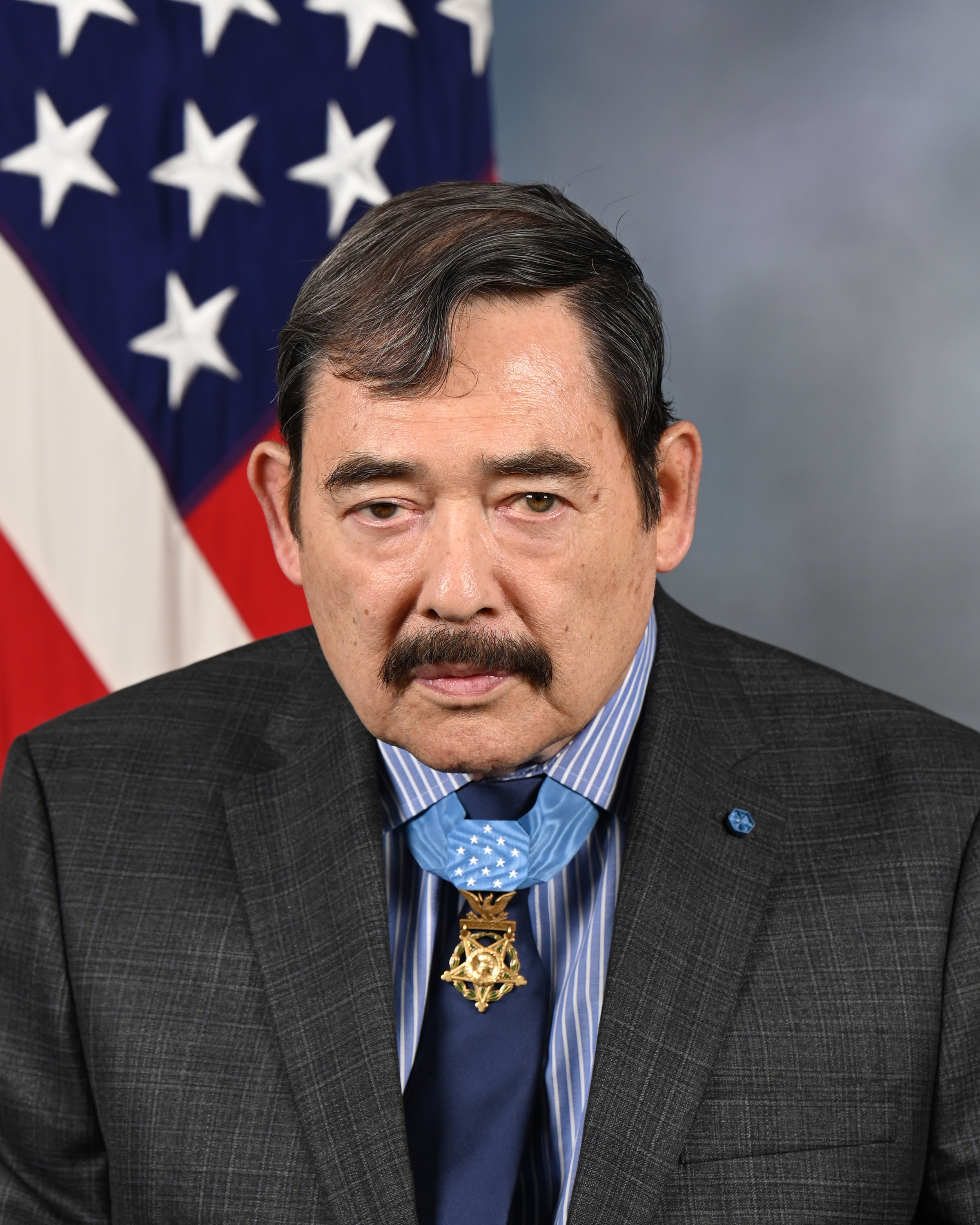
- Fujii in 2022
- Born: 1 March 1949 (age 77); Hanapepe, Hawaii, U.S.
- Military career
- Allegiance: United States of America
- Branch: United States Army
- Service years: 1968–1975
- Rank: Specialist 5
- Unit: 237th Medical Detachment
- Conflicts: Vietnam War; Operation Lam Son 719 (WIA)
- Awards: Medal of Honor; Purple Heart (2)

Dennis Marc Fujii (born March 1, 1949) is a retired United States Army soldier who received the Medal of Honor in 2022 for his actions in the Vietnam War in 1971.

== Early life ==
Fujii was born in Hanapepe, Hawaii, one of six children. He is third generation Japanese American (sansei).

== Military service ==
Fujii enlisted in the Army in 1968 and was able to get his high school diploma while in the service.

=== Vietnam War ===
Fujii deployed to South Vietnam in 1968, he spent his first nine months assigned to the 2nd Battalion, 35th Infantry, 4th Infantry Division as an assistant machine gunner.

During his second tour in South Vietnam on 18 February 1971, now an Sp4c., Fujii was serving as crew chief on a UH-1H medevac helicopter from the 237th Medical Detachment, 61st Medical Battalion supporting Operation Lam Son 719 when it was hit by People's Army of Vietnam (PAVN) fire and crash-landed at Landing Zone (LZ) Ranger North (16.744°N 106.493°E). Two of the crew were rescued by another helicopter while Fujii was unable to reach the rescue helicopter due to fire and stayed at the base to assist the Rangers, providing medical assistance and directing U.S. airstrikes. On 19 February, PAVN attacks commenced against Ranger North conducted by the 102nd Regiment, 308th Division, supported by PT-76 and T-54 tanks. The Rangers held on tenaciously throughout the night supported by gunships and flareships. Despite 32 tactical airstrikes since the morning, by the afternoon of the 20th, the 39th Ranger Battalion had been reduced from 500 to 323 men and aerial reconnaissance indicated that their position was surrounded by 4–500 PAVN and its commander ordered a retreat toward Ranger South (16.736°N 106.472°E), 6 km away. Fujii and several Rangers were evacuated by helicopter, but it was hit by PAVN fire and autorotated onto Ranger South. The crew was rescued but Fujii was again stranded on the ground. Only 199 survivors reached Ranger South by nightfall, with only 109 fit for combat, while 178 were dead or missing. The U.S. estimated 639 PAVN troops were killed during the battle.

PAVN attention then shifted to Ranger South, which was hit by 130mm artillery fire on the night of 21 February. On 22 February an intensive air and artillery bombardment around the base allowed 13 medevac helicopters to evacuate 122 wounded Rangers and Fujii.

Fujii returned to Hawaii on 28 February 1971, and was given a hero's welcome by Governor John A. Burns. He later transferred to the Hawaii Army National Guard and the Pacific Army Reserve.

Fujii was later awarded the Silver Star, later upgraded to a Distinguished Service Cross.

== Later life ==
He went on to work as a utilities and logistics technician for Global Associates at the Johnston Atoll Wildlife Refuge.

== Medal of Honor ==
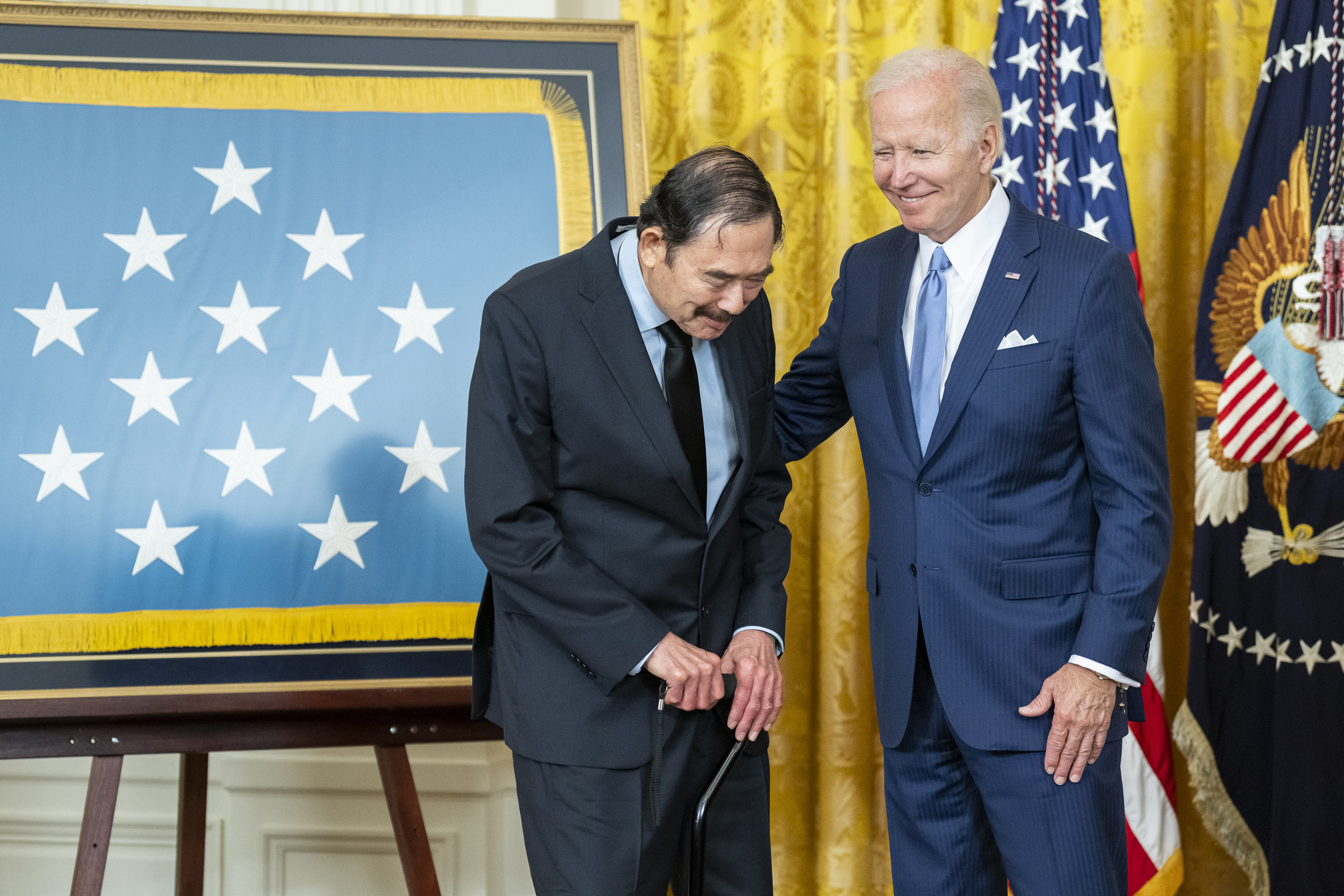
Fujii with Joe Biden

On 27 June 2022 it was announced that President Joe Biden would present the Medal of Honor to Fujii and three others on 5 July 2022.

Fujii was presented with the Medal of Honor on 5 July 2022 in a ceremony at the White House.

The text of Fujii's Medal of Honor citation reads:

Spc. 5 Dennis M. Fujii distinguished himself by conspicuous gallantry and intrepidity beyond the call of duty while serving as crew chief aboard a helicopter ambulance during rescue operations in Laos and the Republic of Vietnam from Feb. 18, 1971 to Feb. 22, 1971. Fujii was serving with the 237th Medical Detachment, 61st Medical Battalion, 67th Medical Group. The team's mission was to evacuate seriously wounded Vietnamese military personnel from the midst of a raging battlefield. During the second landing attempt, the enemy concentrated a barrage of flak at the air ambulance, which damaged the aircraft and caused it to crash, injuring Fujii. A second helicopter was able to land and load all of his fellow downed airmen. However, Fujii was not able to board because the enemy directed fire on him. Rather than endanger the lives aboard the second helicopter, Fujii waved it off to leave the combat area. Subsequent attempts to rescue him were aborted due to the violent anti-aircraft fire. Fujii secured a radio and informed the aviators in the area that the landing zone was too hot for further evacuation attempts. Fujii remained as the lone American on the ground, treating the injuries of South Vietnam troops throughout the night and the next day. On the night of Feb. 19, the allied perimeter came under ruthless assault by a reinforced enemy regiment supported by heavy artillery. Once again obtaining a radio transmitter, Fujii called in American helicopter gunships to assist the small unit in repelling the attack. For a period of over 17 consecutive hours, Fujii repeatedly exposed himself to hostile fire as he left the security of his entrenchment to better observe enemy troop positions and to direct air strikes against them. At times, the fighting became so vicious that Fujii was forced to interrupt radio transmittal in order to place suppressive rifle fire on the enemy while at close quarters. Though wounded and severely fatigued by Feb. 20, the specialist bore the responsibility for the protection and defense of the friendly encampment until an American helicopter could land and attempt to airlift him from the area. As his air ambulance left the still blazing battlefield, it received numerous hits and was forced to crash land at another South Vietnamese Ranger base approximately four kilometers from his original location. The exhausted Fujii remained at the allied camp for two more days until yet another helicopter could return him to Phau Bai for medical assistance on Feb. 22. Fujii's extraordinary heroism and devotion to duty were in keeping with the highest traditions of military service and reflect great credit upon himself, his unit and the United States Army.
