= Charles J. Simons =

First lieutenant in the United States Army

First Lieutenant Charles Jenks Simons
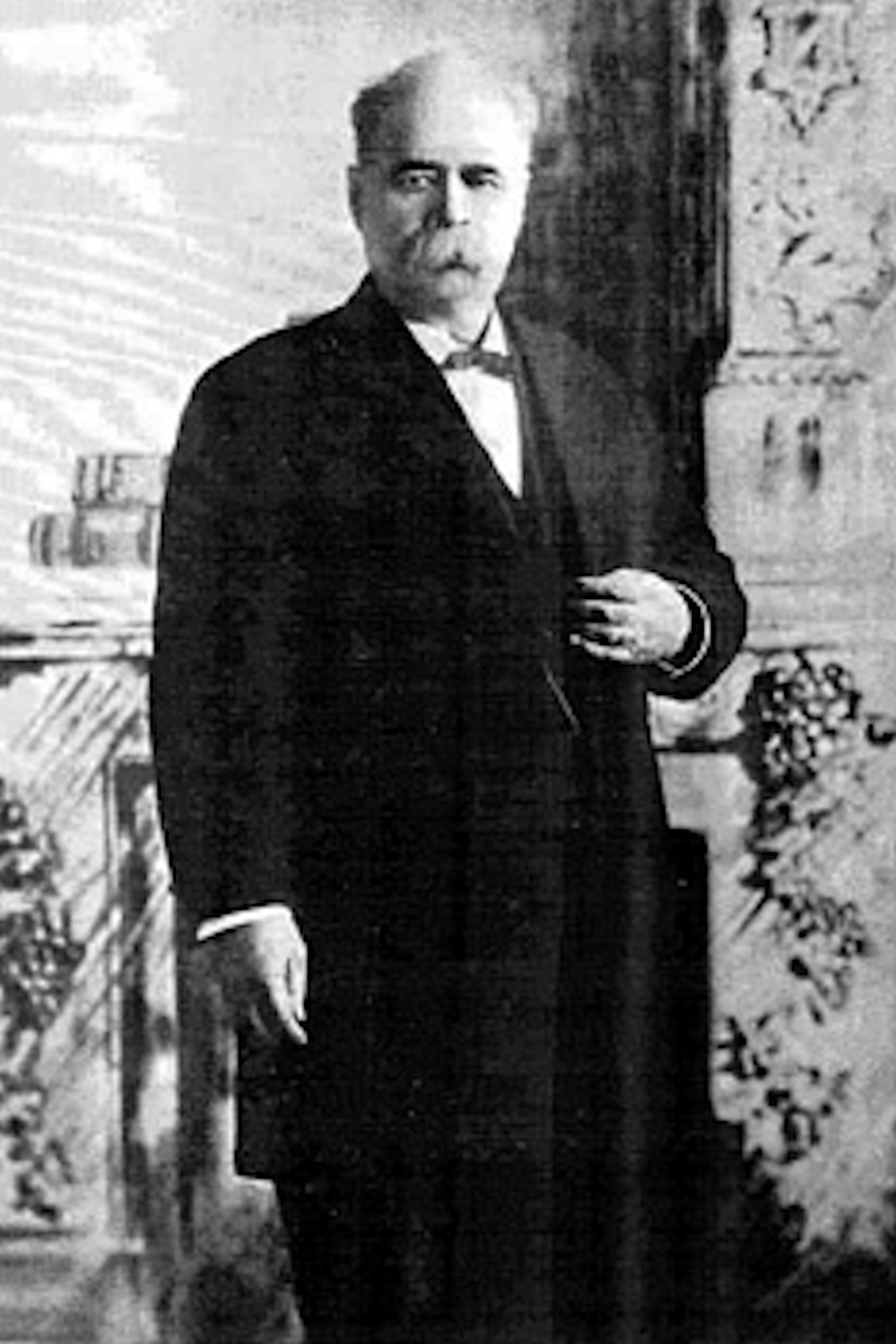
- Simons c.1900
- Born: 29 March 1843; Bombay Presidency, India
- Died: 18 June 1914 (aged 71); Chicago, Illinois, U.S.
- Military career
- Allegiance: United States (Union)
- Branch: U.S. Army (Union Army)
- Service years: 1862-1865
- Rank: Sergeant (1826–1862); First Lieutenant (1862–1864); First Lieutenant (1865–1865)
- Units: Company A, 9th New Hampshire Infantry
- Conflicts: Battle of Petersburg, Virginia
- Awards: Medal of Honor

Charles Jenks Simons (29 March 1843 — 18 June 1914) was a first lieutenant in the United States Army who was awarded the Medal of Honor for gallantry during the American Civil War. He was awarded the medal on 27 July 1896 for actions performed at the Siege of Petersburg in Virginia on 30 July 1864.

== Personal life ==
Simons was born on 29 March 1843 in Bombay (modern-day Mumbai), India. He married Ellen F. Adams in 1868 and fathered one son, Francis Pitcher Simons. He died in Chicago, Illinois, on 18 June 1914.

== Military service ==
Simons enlisted in the Army as a sergeant in Exeter, New Hampshire, on 12 June 1862. On 3 July 1862 he was assigned to Company A of the 9th New Hampshire Infantry. He was wounded on 30 July 1864.

Simons' Medal of Honor citation reads:

The President of the United States of America, in the name of Congress, takes pleasure in presenting the Medal of Honor to Sergeant Charles Jenks Simons, United States Army, for extraordinary heroism on 30 July 1864, while serving with Company A, 9th New Hampshire Infantry, in action at Petersburg, Virginia. Sergeant Simons was one of the first in the exploded mine, captured a number of prisoners, and was himself captured, but escaped.

— D. S. Lamont, Secretary of War

On 1 November 1864, Simons was transferred to Company K of the 9th and promoted to second lieutenant. He was promoted to first lieutenant on 1 February 1865 and was transferred back to Company A. He was mustered out of the Army on 10 June 1865 at Alexandria, Virginia.
