= Elmelindo Rodrigues Smith =

American army soldier

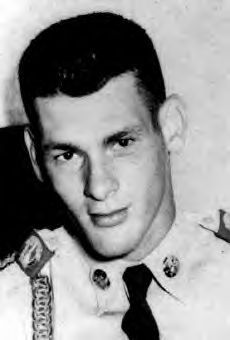
- SFC. Elmelindo Rodrigues Smith, Medal of Honor recipient
- Born: July 27, 1935; Wahiawā, Hawaii, U.S.
- Died: February 16, 1967 (aged 31); Kontum Province, Republic of Vietnam
- Burial place: National Memorial Cemetery of the Pacific, Honolulu, Hawaii
- Military career
- Allegiance: United States of America
- Branch: United States Army
- Service years: 1953–1967
- Rank: Sergeant First Class (posthumous)
- Units: 1st Platoon, Company C, 2nd Battalion, 8th Infantry, 4th Infantry Division
- Conflicts: Vietnam War †
- Awards: Medal of Honor; Purple Heart

Sergeant First Class Elmelindo Rodrigues Smith (July 27, 1935 – February 16, 1967) was a United States Army soldier, of Hispanic-Asian descent, who was posthumously awarded the Medal of Honor for his actions in the Vietnam War. Despite being severely wounded, Smith inspired his men to beat back an enemy assault.

== Early years ==
Smith, an American of Hispanic/Asian descent, was born in Wahiawa, a town located in the center of Oahu Island in the County of Honolulu, Hawaii. There he received his primary and secondary education graduating from Leilehua High School. He joined the United States Army in 1953 and was stationed in various countries overseas, among them was Okinawa.

During his stay in Okinawa, he met a Hawaiian born WAC by the name of Jane and soon they were married. They established their home in a military post in Tacoma, Washington and had two daughters.

== Vietnam War ==
On July 23, 1966, Smith was sent to the Republic of Vietnam and served as Platoon Sergeant of the 1st Platoon, Company C, 2nd Battalion, 8th Infantry of the 4th Infantry Division. The division conducted combat operations in the western Central Highlands along the border between Cambodia and Vietnam. The division experienced intense combat against North Vietnamese Army (NVA) regular forces in the mountains surrounding Kontum.

On February 16, 1967, Sergeant Smith was leading his platoon in a reconnaissance patrol, when suddenly it came under attack. NVA forces attacked the patrol with machinegun, mortar and rocket fire. Despite the fact that he was wounded, he coordinated a counterattack by positioning his men and distributing ammunition. He was struck by a rocket, but continued to expose himself in order to direct his men's fire upon the approaching enemy. Even though he perished from his wounds, his actions resulted in the defeat of the enemy.

For his actions, he was recommended for the Medal of Honor. In October 1968, his family received the medal from the hands of Secretary of the Army Stanley R. Resor, because President Lyndon B. Johnson was ill at the time. However, after the ceremony, which was held at the White House, the family which included his widow Jane and two daughters, Kathleen 10 and Pamela 6, were taken to President Johnson's bedroom.

== Medal of Honor citation ==
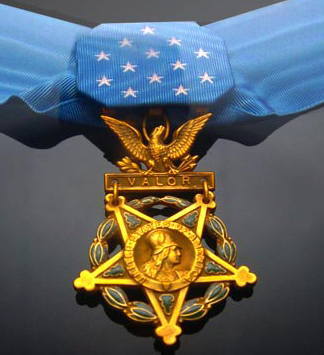

SMITH, ELMELINDO RODRIGUES
Rank and organization: Platoon Sergeant (then S/Sgt.), U.S. Army, 1st Platoon, Company C, 2d Battalion, 8th Infantry, 4th Infantry Division.
Place and date: Republic of Vietnam, 16 February 1967
Entered service at: Honolulu, Hawaii
Born: 27 July 1935, Honolulu, Hawaii
Citation:

For conspicuous gallantry and intrepidity at the risk of his life above and beyond the call of duty. During a reconnaissance patrol. his platoon was suddenly engaged by intense machinegun fire hemming in the platoon on 3 sides. A defensive perimeter was hastily established, but the enemy added mortar and rocket fire to the deadly fusillade and assaulted the position from several directions. With complete disregard for his safety, P/Sgt. Smith moved through the deadly fire along the defensive line, positioning soldiers, distributing ammunition and encouraging his men to repeal the enemy attack. Struck to the ground by enemy fire which caused a severe shoulder wound, he regained his feet, killed the enemy soldier and continued to move about the perimeter. He was again wounded in the shoulder and stomach but continued moving on his knees to assist in the defense. Noting the enemy massing at a weakened point on the perimeter, he crawled into the open and poured deadly fire into the enemy ranks. As he crawled on, he was struck by a rocket. Moments later, he regained consciousness, and drawing on his fast dwindling strength, continued to crawl from man to man. When he could move no farther, he chose to remain in the open where he could alert the perimeter to the approaching enemy. P/Sgt. Smith perished, never relenting in his determined effort against the enemy. The valorous acts and heroic leadership of this outstanding soldier inspired those remaining members of his platoon to beat back the enemy assaults. P/Sgt. Smith's gallant actions were in keeping with the highest traditions of the U.S. Army and they reflect great credit upon him and the Armed Forces of his country.

== Postscript ==
Sergeant First Class Elmelindo Rodrigues Smith's remains were buried with full military honors in the National Memorial Cemetery of the Pacific located in Honolulu, Hawaii. His name is inscribed in the Vietnam War Memorial located in Washington, D.C. in Panel 15E – Row 051.

== Awards and recognitions ==
Among Smith's decorations and medals are the following:

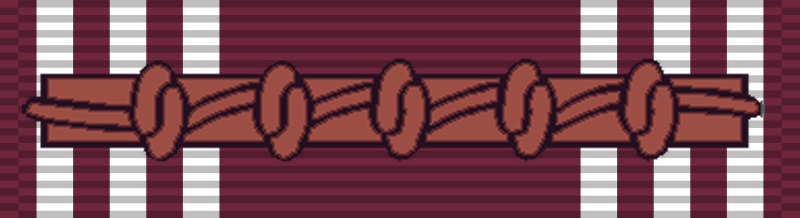

Badge	Combat Infantryman Badge		
1st Row	Medal of Honor		
2nd Row	Purple Heart	Army Good Conduct Medal with bronze clasp and 5 loops (5 awards)	National Defense Service Medal
3rd Row	Vietnam Service Medal with one campaign star	Vietnam Cross of Gallantry with palm	Republic of Vietnam Campaign Medal with "60-" clasp
Badge	4th Infantry Division; Combat Service Identification Badge		

Foreign unit decorations

- Fourragère cord

== See also ==
- List of Medal of Honor recipients for the Vietnam War
- Hispanic Medal of Honor recipients
