= List of ranks used by the United States Army =

This is a list of every rank used by the United States Army, with dates showing each rank's beginning and end.

Ranks used to the end of the Revolutionary War are shown as ending on June 2, 1784. This is the date that the Continental Army was ordered to be demobilized; actual demobilization took until June 20.

== A ==
- Acting Hospital Steward: March 1, 1887 - March 2, 1903
- Apothecary: July 27, 1775 - June 2, 1784
- Apothecary General: February 27, 1777 - June 2, 1784, March 2, 1799 - May 14, 1800, March 3, 1813 - March 2, 1821
- Armorer: March 14, 1777 - May 27, 1778
- Artificer: March 5, 1792 - June 3, 1916
- Assistant Apothecary : March 30, 1813 - March 2, 1821
- Assistant Apothecary General: October 6, 1780 - July 23, 1782
- Assistant Band Leader: June 3, 1916 - July 1, 1920
- Assistant Chauffeur: July 15, 1917 - July 1, 1920
- Assistant Commissary: March 3, 1813 - March 2, 1821
- Assistant Deputy Apothecary: September 20, 1781 - June 2, 1784
- Assistant Deputy Director of Hospitals: January 7, 1777 - May 9, 1777
- Assistant District Paymaster: April 18, 1814 - March 3, 1815
- Assistant Engineer: June 3, 1916 - July 1, 1920
- Assistant Medical Purveyor: October 6, 1780 - July 23, 1782, July 28, 1866 - July 27, 1892
- Assistant Steward, Mine Planter Service: July 9, 1918 - July 1, 1920
- Assistant Surgeon: March 2, 1821 - April 23, 1908
- Assistant Surgeon General: April 14, 1818 - March 2, 1821, April 16, 1862 - April 23, 1908
- Aviator: June 3, 1916 - July 1, 1920

== B ==
- Band Corporal: June 3, 1916 - July 1, 1920
- Band Leader: June 3, 1916 - June 4, 1920
- Band Sergeant: June 3, 1916 - July 1, 1920
- Battalion Commissary Sergeant: July 29, 1861 - July 28, 1866
- Battalion Hospital Steward: July 29, 1861 - July 28, 1866
- Battalion Quartermaster Sergeant: July 29, 1861 - June 3, 1916
- Battalion Saddler Sergeant: July 29, 1861 - July 17, 1862
- Battalion Sergeant Major: July 29, 1861 - July 1, 1920
- Battalion Supply Sergeant: June 3, 1916 - July 1, 1920
- Battalion Veterinary Sergeant: July 29, 1861 - July 17, 1862
- Battery Quartermaster Sergeant: April 26, 1898 - June 3, 1916
- Battery Supply Sergeant: June 3, 1916 - July 1, 1920
- Blacksmith: March 3, 1799 - April 12, 1808, June 26, 1812 - March 3, 1815
- Boatswain, Sea Fencibles: July 26, 1813 - February 27, 1815
- Bombardier: July 29, 1775 - June 2, 1784
- Brigadier General: June 17, 1775 - June 2, 1784, March 3, 1791 -
- Bugler: March 30, 1814 - March 3, 1815, March 2, 1833 - March 3, 1863, June 3, 1916 - July 1, 1920
- Bugler First Class: July 9, 1918 - July 1, 1920

== C ==
- Captain: June 14, 1775 -
- Captain Lieutenant: July 29, 1775 - June 2, 1784
- Chaplain: March 3, 1791 - June 4, 1920
- Chauffeur: July 24, 1917 - July 1, 1920
- Chauffeur First Class: July 24, 1917 - July 1, 1920
- Chief Bugler: March 2, 1833 - July 17, 1862
- Chief Hospital Physician: September 30, 1780 - January 3, 1782
- Chief Mechanic: January 25, 1907 - July 1, 1920
- Chief Medical Purveyor: July 28, 1866 - July 27, 1892
- Chief Musician: March 2, 1799 - March 16, 1802, March 3, 1869 - June 3, 1916
- Chief Physician: July 15, 1775 - December 1, 1776, March 22, 1780 - June 2, 1784
- Chief Physician and Hospital Surgeon: March 1, 1781 - June 2, 1784
- Chief Physician and Surgeon of the Army: October 6, 1780 - December 23, 1783
- Chief Trumpeter: July 17, 1862 - June 3, 1916
- Chief Warrant Officer: August 21, 1941 - May 29, 1954
- Chief Warrant Officer 2: May 29, 1954 -
- Chief Warrant Officer 3: May 29, 1954 -
- Chief Warrant Officer 4: May 29, 1954 -
- Chief Warrant Officer 5: December 5, 1991 -
- Colonel: July 18, 1775 - June 2, 1784, March 8, 1802 -
- Color Sergeant: February 2, 1901 - July 1, 1920
- Command Sergeant Major: July 12, 1967 -
- Commissary General of Issues: June 10, 1777 - July 10, 1781
- Commissary General of Purchases: June 10, 1777 - July 10, 1781, March 28, 1812 - April 22, 1842
- Commissary Sergeant: March 3, 1873 - March 2, 1899
- Company Commissary Sergeant: July 17, 1862 - July 28, 1866
- Company Quartermaster Sergeant: July 29, 1861 - May 15, 1872, April 26, 1898 - June 3, 1916
- Company Supply Sergeant: June 3, 1916 - July 1, 1920
- Cook: July 7, 1898 - July 1, 1920
- Cornet: June 15, 1776 - June 2, 1784, March 3, 1792 - March 3, 1799, April 12, 1808 - March 3, 1815
- Corporal: June 14, 1775 - June 2, 1784, June 3, 1784 -
- Corporal Bugler: July 9, 1918 - July 1, 1920

== D ==
- Deck hand, Mine Planter Service: July 9, 1918 - July 1, 1920
- Deputy Commissary: March 28, 1812 - March 2, 1821
- Deputy Commissary General of Issues: June 10, 1777 - June 28, 1780
- Deputy Commissary General of Purchases: June 10, 1777 - July 10, 1780
- Deputy Director General of Hospitals: April 7, 1777- September 30, 1780
- Deputy Paymaster General: June 7, 1776 - January 17, 1781
- Deputy Surgeon General: July 27, 1892- April 23, 1908
- Director General and Chief Physician: July 27, 1775 - June 2, 1784
- District Paymaster: May 16, 1812 - April 24, 1816
- Driver of Artillery: May 16, 1812 - March 30, 1814
- Drum Major: July 16, 1776 - June 2, 1784, July 29, 1861 - July 28, 1866, March 2, 1899 - June 3, 1916
- Drummer: June 14, 1775- June 2, 1784, April 12, 1785 - October 3, 1787

== E ==
- Electrician Sergeant: March 2, 1899 - January 25, 1907
- Electrician Sergeant First Class: January 25, 1907 - July 1, 1920
- Electrician Sergeant Second Class: January 25, 1907 - July 1, 1920
- Engineer: January 25, 1907 - July 1, 1920
- Enlisted Men of Ordnance: May 14, 1812 - July 5, 1862
- Ensign: July 18, 1775 - June 2, 1784, June 3, 1784 - March 3, 1799, March 16, 1802 - March 3, 1815

== F ==
- Farrier: March 14, 1777 - June 2, 1784, March 3, 1792 - March 16, 1802, April 12, 1808 - March 3, 1815, March 23, 1910 - July 1, 1920
- Farrier and Blacksmith: March 2, 1833 - March 23, 1910
- Field Clerk: August 29, 1916 - April 27, 1926
- Fife Major: July 16, 1776 - June 2, 1784
- Fifer: June 18, 1775 - June 2, 1784, April 12, 1785 - October 3, 1787
- Fireman: January 25, 1907 - July 1, 1920
- First Lieutenant: March 3, 1799 -
- First Sergeant: July 5, 1838 -
- Flight Officer: July 8, 1942 - July 26, 1947

== G ==
- Garrison Surgeon: March 16, 1802 - April 24, 1816
- Garrison Surgeon's Mate: March 3, 1791 - March 3, 1795, March 16, 1802 - April 24, 1816
- General: October 6, 1917 - June 30, 1920, February 23, 1929 -
- General and Commander in Chief: June 17, 1775 - December 23, 1783
- General of the Armies of the United States: September 3, 1919 - September 13, 1924
- General of the Army: December 14, 1944 - April 8, 1981
- General of the Army of the United States: July 25, 1866 - February 8, 1884, June 1, 1888 - August 5, 1888
- General Service Clerk: July 29, 1886 - August 6, 1894
- General Service Messenger: July 29, 1886 - August 6, 1894
- Gunner, Sea Fencibles: July 26, 1813 - February 27, 1815

== H ==
- Horseshoer: March 23, 1910 - July 1, 1920
- Hospital Chaplain: May 20, 1862 - April 9, 1864
- Hospital Sergeant: June 3, 1916 - July 1, 1920
- Hospital Steward: April 15, 1856 - March 2, 1903
- Hospital Surgeon: March 2, 1799 - May 14, 1800, April 12, 1808 - April 14, 1818
- Hospital Surgeon's Mate: March 2, 1799 - May 14, 1800, April 12, 1808 - April 14, 1818

== J ==
- Judge Advocate: July 29, 1775 - August 10, 1776, April 10, 1777 - June 3, 1782, January 11, 1812 - March 2, 1821

== L ==
- Lance Corporal: March 2, 1821 - August 3, 1920
- Lieutenant: June 14, 1775 - June 2, 1784, June 3, 1784 - March 3, 1799
- Lieutenant Colonel: July 18, 1775 - June 2, 1784, June 3, 1784
- Lieutenant General: May 28, 1798 - March 3, 1799, February 29, 1864 - August 5, 1888, February 5, 1895 - September 29, 1895, June 6, 1900 - June 2, 1909, October 6, 1918 - June 30, 1920, August 5, 1939 -

== M ==
- Major: July 29, 1775 - June 2, 1784, June 3, 1784 -
- Major General: June 17, 1775 - June 2, 1784, March 3, 1791 - March 3, 1797, May 28, 1798 - March 16, 1802, January 11, 1812 -
- Master Electrician: March 2, 1903 - June 3, 1916
- Master Engineer Junior Grade: June 3, 1916 - July 1, 1920
- Master Engineer Senior Grade: June 3, 1916 - July 1, 1920
- Master Gunner: January 25, 1907 - July 1, 1920
- Master Hospital Sergeant: June 3, 1916 - July 1, 1920
- Master of the Sword: June 26, 1812 - March 3, 1815
- Master Sergeant: July 1, 1920 -
- Master Signal Electrician: April 28, 1904 - July 1, 1920
- Master Specialist: July 1, 1955 - March 1, 1958
- Master Wagoner: August 3, 1861 - 1879
- Master Warrant Officer: April 8, 1988 - December 5, 1991
- Mechanic: March 2, 1899 - July 1, 1920
- Medical Cadet: August 3, 1861 - July 28, 1866
- Medical Inspector: April 16, 1862 - November 20, 1865
- Medical Inspector General: April 16, 1862 - October 31, 1865
- Medical Purveyor: March 2, 1799 - May 14, 1800
- Medical Storekeeper: May 20, 1862 - June 28, 1878
- Mess Sergeant: June 3, 1916 - July 1, 1920
- Military Agent: March 16, 1802 - March 28, 1812
- Military Storekeeper: March 3, 1813 - March 3, 1875, July 1, 1898 - March 2, 1899, August 29, 1916 - November 13, 1926
- Musician: October 3, 1787 - June 3, 1916
- Musician First Class: June 3, 1916 - July 1, 1920
- Musician Second Class: June 3, 1916 - July 1, 1920
- Musician Third Class: June 3, 1916 - July 1, 1920

== O ==
- Oiler, Mine Planter Service: July 9, 1918 - July 1, 1920
- Ordnance Sergeant: April 5, 1832 - July 1, 1920
- Ordnance Storekeeper: July 28, 1866 - October 3, 1903

== P ==
- Paymaster: April 24, 1816 - March 3, 1847
- Paymaster General: June 16, 1775 - August 1, 1788, May 8, 1792 - March 3, 1847
- Physician and Surgeon General: April 7, 1777 - January 1, 1781, March 3, 1813 - June 15, 1815
- Physician General: May 28, 1798 - May 14, 1800
- Physician General of Hospitals: April 7, 1777 - July 21, 1780
- Post Chaplain: July 28, 1866 - February 2, 1901
- Post Commissary Sergeant: March 2, 1899 - August 24, 1912
- Post Quartermaster Sergeant: July 5, 1884 - August 24, 1912
- Post Surgeon: April 24, 1816 - March 2, 1821
- Principal Musician: April 12, 1808 - June 3, 1916
- Principal Teamster: March 3, 1847 - February 3, 1848
- Private: June 14, 1775 -
- Private First Class: May 15, 1846 -
- Private of the Hospital Corps.: March 1, 1887- March 2, 1903
- Private Second Class: May 15, 1846 - July 1, 1920

== Q ==
- Quarter Gunner, Sea Fencibles: July 26, 1813 - February 27, 1815
- Quartermaster General: March 3, 1791 - March 16, 1802
- Quartermaster Sergeant: July 16, 1776 - June 2, 1784, April 12, 1808 - March 2, 1899
- Quartermaster Sergeant Senior Grade: June 3, 1916 - July 1, 1920
- Quartermaster Sergeant, Quartermaster Corps: August 24, 1912 - July 1, 1920

== R ==
- Radio Sergeant: June 3, 1916 - July 1, 1920
- Regimental Commissary Sergeant: July 22, 1861 - July 15, 1870, March 2, 1899 - June 3, 1916
- Regimental Hospital Steward: July 22, 1861 - July 15, 1870
- Regimental Quartermaster Sergeant: March 2, 1899 - June 3, 1916
- Regimental Sergeant Major: March 2, 1899 - July 1, 1920
- Regimental Supply Sergeant: June 3, 1916 - July 1, 1920
- Riding Master: March 14, 1777 - June 2, 1784, April 12, 1808 - March 3, 1815

== S ==
- Saddler: March 14, 1777 - June 2, 1784, March 5, 1792 - March 16, 1802, April 12, 1808 - March 3, 1815, July 29, 1861 - July 1, 1920
- Saddler Sergeant: July 29, 1861 - March 2, 1899
- Second Lieutenant: March 3, 1799 -
- Senior Musician: April 30, 1790 - March 3, 1799
- Sergeant: June 14, 1775 - June 2, 1784, June 3, 1784 -
- Sergeant Bugler: June 3, 1916 - July 1, 1920
- Sergeant First Class: October 1, 1890 - July 1, 1920, August 1, 1948
- Sergeant Major: July 16, 1776 - June 2, 1784, May 20, 1796 - March 2, 1899, June 1, 1958 - July 12, 1967, November 1, 1969
- Sergeant Major of the Army: July 11, 1966 -
- Sergeant Major, Junior Grade: February 2, 1901 - July 1, 1920
- Sergeant Major, Senior Grade: February 2, 1901 - July 1, 1920
- Specialist: October 1, 1985 -
- Specialist 4: June 1, 1958 - October 1, 1985
- Specialist 5: June 1, 1958 - October 1, 1985
- Specialist 6: June 1, 1958 - October 1, 1985
- Specialist 7: June 1, 1958 - March 1, 1978
- Specialist 8: June 1, 1958 - September 1, 1965
- Specialist 9: June 1, 1958 - September 1, 1965
- Specialist Fifth Class: July 1, 1920 - June 1, 1942
- Specialist First Class: July 1, 1920 - June 1, 1942, July 1, 1955 - June 1, 1958
- Specialist Fourth Class: July 1, 1920 - June 1, 1942
- Specialist Second Class: July 1, 1920 - June 1, 1942, July 1, 1955 - June 1, 1958
- Specialist Sixth Class: July 1, 1920 - June 1, 1942
- Specialist Third Class: July 1, 1920 - June 1, 1942, July 1, 1955 - June 1, 1958
- Squadron Sergeant Major: March 2, 1899 - July 1, 1920
- Stable Sergeant: March 2, 1899 - July 1, 1920
- Staff Sergeant: July 1, 1920 - August 1, 1948, June 1, 1958 -
- Staff Sergeant Major: July 12, 1967 - November 1, 1969
- Steward, Mine Planter Service: July 9, 1918 - July 1, 1920
- Supply Sergeant: June 3, 1916 - July 1, 1920
- Surgeon: July 29, 1775 - June 2, 1784, June 3, 1784 - March 16, 1802, April 12, 1808 - April 23, 1908
- Surgeon General: April 14, 1818 - April 23, 1908
- Surgeon's Mate: July 29, 1775 - June 2, 1784, June 3, 1784 - March 16, 1802, April 12, 1808 - March 2, 1821

== T ==
- Teacher of Drawing: February 28, 1803 - April 29, 1812
- Teacher of Music: March 16, 1802 - April 12, 1808
- Teacher of The French Language: February 28, 1803 - April 29, 1812
- Teamster: March 3, 1847 - February 3, 1848
- Technical Sergeant: July 1, 1920 - August 1, 1948
- Technician Grade 3: June 1, 1942 - August 1, 1948
- Technician Grade 4: June 1, 1942 - August 1, 1948
- Technician Grade 5: June 1, 1942 - August 1, 1948
- Third Lieutenant: January 20, 1813 - March 2, 1821, June 15, 1832 - March 2, 1833
- Troop Quartermaster Sergeant: April 26, 1898 - June 3, 1916
- Trumpeter: June 14, 1775 - June 2, 1784, March 5, 1792 - March 3, 1799, January 11, 1812 - March 3, 1815, March 3, 1863 - June 3, 1916

== V ==
- Veterinary Surgeon: March 3, 1863 - July 28, 1866
- Veterinarian: March 2, 1899- June 3, 1916

== W ==
- Wagoner: July 22, 1861 - July 1, 1920
- Warrant Officer: July 9, 1918 - August 21, 1941
- Warrant Officer 1: May 29, 1954 -
- Warrant Officer Junior Grade: August 21, 1941 - May 29, 1954
