= Edward N. Kaneshiro =

United States Army Medal of Honor recipient

- Born: 19 July 1928; Honolulu, Hawaii, U.S.
- Died: 6 March 1967 (aged 38); Bình Định, Vietnam
- Military career
- Allegiance: United States of America
- Branch: United States Army
- Service years: 1959–1967
- Rank: Staff Sergeant
- Units: 1st Squadron, 9th Cavalry Regiment
- Conflicts: Vietnam War; Operation Thayer II
- Awards: Medal of Honor; Purple Heart

Edward Noboru Kaneshiro (Japanese: 金城 昇, 19 July 1928 – 6 March 1967) was a staff sergeant in the US Army. He received the Medal of Honor posthumously on 5 July 2022, for his actions in the Vietnam War on 1 December 1966.

== Early life ==
Edward Kaneshiro was born in Honolulu, Hawaii, in 1928, as a third generation Japanese American (sansei). The eighth child of 16 siblings, he resided in Hawaii and grew up working on the family farm. He graduated from Leilehua High School in June 1946, then worked for several civilian employers.

== Military career ==
Kaneshiro enlisted in the Army on 2 April 1959. Upon completion of advanced individual training as an infantryman, he was assigned to Company C, 1st Battalion, 27th Infantry Regiment, 25th Infantry Division, at Schofield Barracks in Hawaii. He served in non-combat overseas tours in Okinawa, Japan and South Korea, and was then assigned Troop C, 1st Squadron, 9th Cavalry Regiment, 1st Cavalry Division (Airmobile).

=== Vietnam War ===
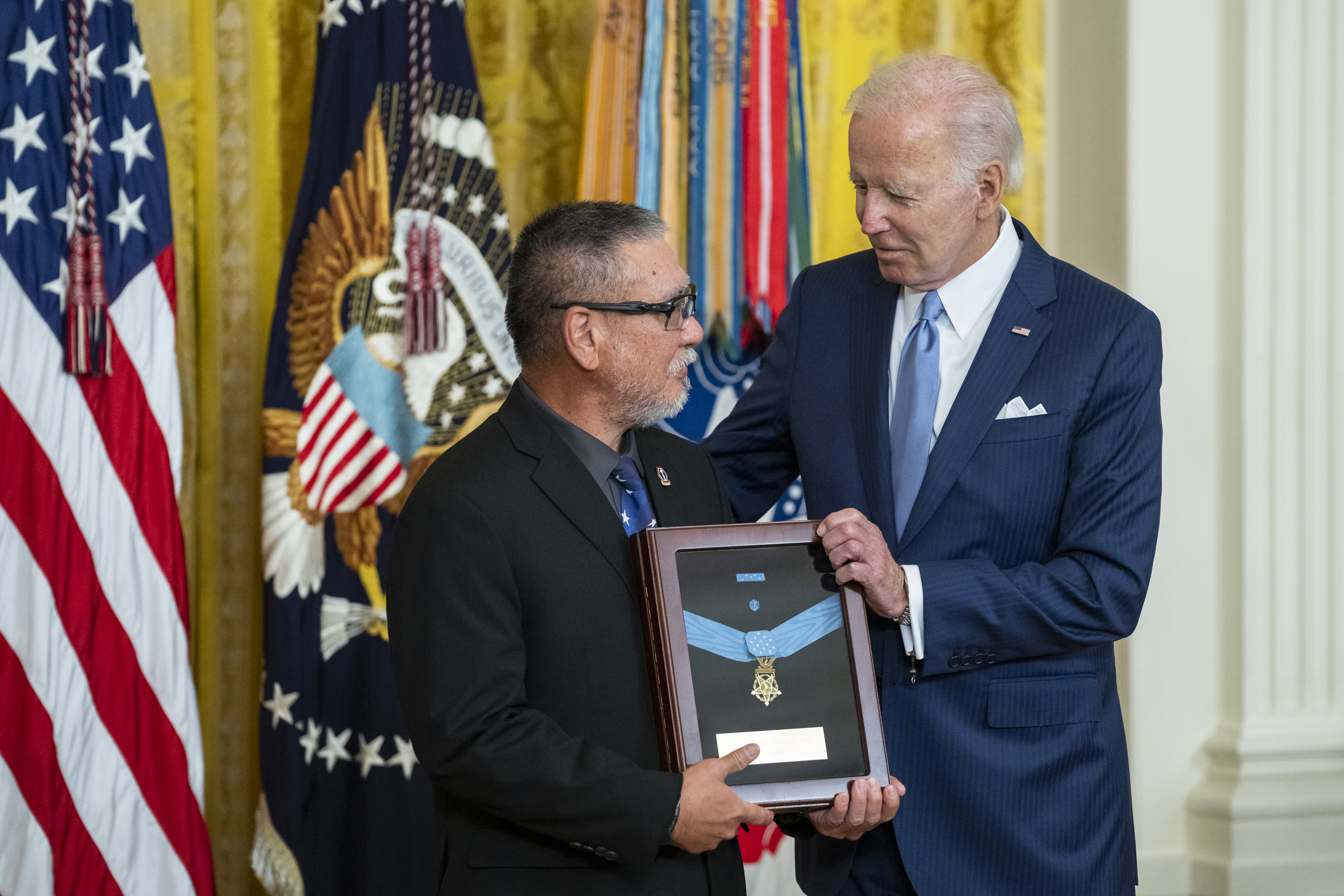
Kaneshiro's son, John, received the Medal of Honor on his behalf from President Joe Biden on July 5, 2022

He deployed to South Vietnam as a squad leader within his platoon. During a mission in the Kim Son Valley, on 1 December 1966, his unit came under fire from North Vietnamese People's Army of Vietnam (PAVN) troops. Kaneshiro crawled forward to attack, using six grenades and an M16 rifle. This saved the lives of U.S. soldiers allowing them to successfully advance.

Kaneshiro was killed in action on 6 March 1967, as a result of a hostile gunshot wound.

== Personal life ==
Kaneshiro left behind his wife Mitsuko and their five children. She began a life of tremendous difficulty raising five children alone, the oldest daughter at 10 and the youngest son at only four months. His son followed his father's footsteps joining the Army as a non-commissioned officer and reaching the rank of Master Sgt. before retiring. Mitsuko died on 10 April 2022, less than three months from the Medal of Honor presentation, she was 90 years old.

== Awards and decorations ==
=== Medal of Honor ===
On 27 June 2022 it was announced that President Joe Biden would present the Medal of Honor to Kaneshiro (posthumously) and three others on 5 July 2022.

Kaneshiro's son John was presented with his father's Medal of Honor on 5 July 2022 in a ceremony at the White House.

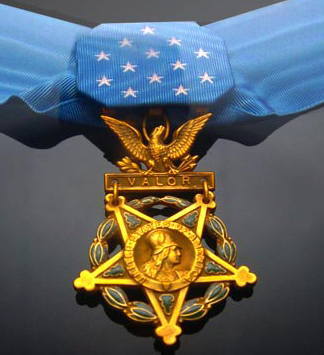

Edward Noboru Kaneshiro
Rank: Staff Sergeant
Conflict/Era: Vietnam War
Unit: Troop C, 1st Squadron, 9th Cavalry Regiment, 1st Cavalry Division.
Military Branch: U.S. Army
Location and Date: Near Phu Huu 2, Kim Son Valley, Republic of Vietnam, 1 December 1966
Born: January 1, 1928, Honolulu, Hawaii, United States

Citation:

Staff Sgt. Edward N. Kaneshiro distinguished himself by acts of gallantry and intrepidity above and beyond the call of duty while serving as an infantry squad leader with Troop C, 1st Squadron, 9th Cavalry Regiment, 1st Cavalry Division, near Phu Huu 2, Kim Son Valley, Republic of Vietnam, on Dec. 1, 1966. Not knowing that the village was heavily fortified with a fully bunkered, concealed trench system and garrisoned by North Vietnamese troops in vastly superior force, two squads of the platoon had deployed to its center, while Kaneshiro and his squad scouted the more open terrain to the east of the village. Sensing the opportunity to ambush the infantry squads, the entrenched enemy force erupted with machine gun and small-arms fire against the two squads at the center of the village, killing the platoon leader and the point man, wounding four others, and successfully suppressing the surviving Soldiers. Kaneshiro moved with his men to the sounds of the fire. Swiftly reading the situation, and seeing that fire from the big trench had to be stopped if anyone was to survive, he first deployed his men to cover, then crawled forward to attack the enemy force alone. He began by throwing grenades from the parapet while flattened to the ground, successfully throwing the first grenade through the aperture of the bunker, eliminating the machine gunner who had opened the action. That done, with five grenades remaining and his rifle to sustain his assault, Kaneshiro jumped into the trench to sweep its length where it fronted the two pinned squads. Over a distance of about 35 meters, he worked the ditch alone, destroying one enemy group with rifle fire and two others with grenades. Kaneshiro's actions enabled the orderly extrication and reorganization of the platoon, which was the beginning of a larger action that ultimately led to a successful withdrawal from the village. His conspicuous gallantry and uncommon heroism under fire were in keeping with the highest traditions of the military service and reflect great credit upon himself, his unit and the United States Army.

=== Commendations ===
SSGT Kaneshiro was awarded the following during his military career:

Badge	Combat Infantryman Badge		
1st row	Medal of Honor upgraded from the Distinguished Service Cross		
2nd row	Silver Star	Purple Heart	Army Good Conduct Medal with 2 bronze Good Conduct Loops
3rd row	National Defense Service Medal	Vietnam Service Medal	Vietnam Campaign Medal
