= United States Army enlisted rank insignia of World War II =

The U.S. Army Enlisted rank insignia that was used during World War II differs from the current system. The color scheme used for the insignia's chevron design was defined as golden olive drab chevrons on a dark blue-black wool background for wear on "winter" uniform dress coats and dress shirts or silvery-khaki chevrons on a dark blue-black cotton background for wear on the various types of field jackets and "winter" uniform fatigue shirts. An unauthorized variant that nevertheless saw wide use was olive drab chevrons on a khaki cotton background for wear on the "summer" uniform dress coats (introduced in 1929 and discontinued for issue in 1938) and dress shirts. This scheme of rank insignia was established by War Department Circular No. 303 on 5 August 1920 and would see two significant changes in 1942. The usage of this style of insignia was ended by Department of the Army Circular No. 202, dated 7 July 1948, which provided for significant changes in both rank and insignia design. They also formally added the 5 star General in 1944 as commander of armies along with the 5 star Admiral.

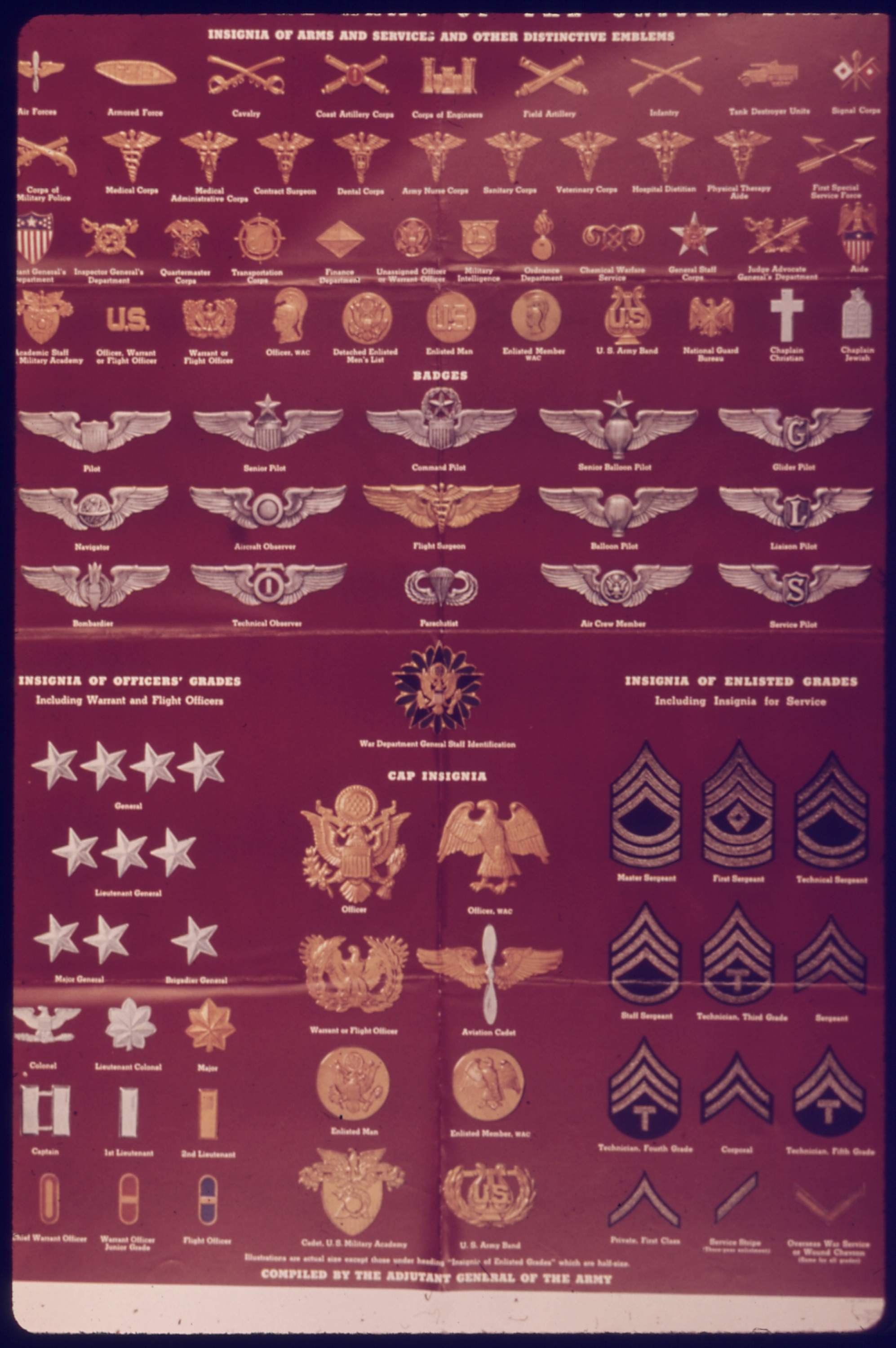
"Insignia of the Army of the United States", Office of War Information.

== Pay grades, 1920-1942 ==
=== Enlisted men ===
In 1920, the United States Army pay grade system was modified so the enlisted ranks were completely separated from the officer ranks. Previously, the grades of pay were numbered from 1 (general or admiral) to about 21 (private or apprentice seaman). Military budgets had previously paid servicemen by their military occupation rather than their rank, leading to 134 different trades with an array of insignia and no clear authority. Trades were now grouped in seven "grades" of pay separated by rank. The "7th grade" indicated the lowest enlisted grade (i.e., private) and the "1st grade" signified the highest (i.e., master sergeant). Three major permanent changes to enlisted men's pay during the interwar period were made, as a result of the National Defense Act of 1920, the Pay Readjustment Act of 1922, and the Selective Training and Service Act of 1940, while temporary economy measures were taken during the Great Depression (Economy Act of March 20, 1933).

U.S. Army enlisted monthly base pay scales, 1920–1942
Year	Grade 1	Grade 2	Grade 3	Grade 4	Grade 5	Grade 6	Grade 7
1920–21	$74	$53	$45	$45	$35	$35	$30
1922–39	$126	$84	$72	$54	$42	$30	$21
1940–42	$126	$84	$72	$60	$54	$60	$30 ($21 for men with less than six months of service)

In accordance with the National Defense Act of 1920, National Guardsmen received one-thirtieth of the monthly base pay (i.e., one day's pay) of their equivalent Regular Army rank per drill day or day spent in annual training, not counting any additional state salary if their states chose to provide it.

==== Longevity pay ====
- 1920–21: Ten percent of base pay for each five years of service, up to forty percent.
- 1922–39: Five percent of base pay for each four years of service, up to twenty-five percent.
- 1940–42: Ten percent of base pay and specialty pay after the first four years of service, and a five percent additional increase for each four years thereafter, to a maximum of twenty-five percent.

==== Specialist pay ====
The rating (not rank) of specialist had the command responsibilities of either a private first class or private, but conveyed slightly higher pay depending on the specialty and skill. The additional pay, in addition to the maximum percentage of ratings allowed when compared to the total number of men in the sixth and seventh grades, was defined in the National Defense Act of 1920. Specialist rating pay was increased as a result of the Selective Training and Service Act of 1940.

Specialist class	Additional pay per month	Maximum percentage allowed
First class	$25.00 ($30.00 from 1940-42)	0.7%
Second class	$20.00 ($25.00 from 1940-42)	1.4%
Third class	$15.00 ($20.00 from 1940-42)	1.9%
Fourth class	$12.00 ($15.00 from 1940-42)	4.7%
Fifth class	$8.00 ($10.00 from 1940-42)	5%
Sixth class	$3.00 ($5.00 from 1940-42)	15.2%

While the official insignia was a single chevron, it was not uncommon for local commanders to authorize the use of specialist insignia which consisted of one chevron and one to six rockers depending on the pay grade of the specialist (one rocker in the 6th grade, six rockers in the 1st grade). To indicate the specific specialty, trade badges were sometimes inset between the chevron and the first rocker. These were often identical to the abandoned trade badges used before the reforms of 1920.

== Rank insignia, 1920–1942 ==
Grade 1	Grade 2		Grade 3	Grade 4	Grade 5	Grade 6	Grade 7
							No Insignia
Master sergeant	First sergeant	Technical sergeant	Staff sergeant	Sergeant	Corporal	Private first class/Specialist	Private/Specialist
M/Sgt.	1st Sgt.	T/Sgt.	S/Sgt.	Sgt.	Cpl.	Pfc.	Pvt.

== Pay grades, 1942-1948 ==
The Pay Readjustment Act of 1942 significantly increased enlisted base pay, and matched officer and enlisted longevity pay (five percent of base pay for each three years of service, up to thirty years). The base pay of enlisted men was increased twenty percent, and the base pay of officers was increased ten percent, when they were stationed on sea duty or on any place outside the continental United States to include Alaska.

U.S. Army enlisted monthly base pay scales, 1942-1948
Year	Grade 1	Grade 2	Grade 3	Grade 4	Grade 5	Grade 6	Grade 7
1942-48	$138	$114	$96	$78	$66	$54	$50

== Rank insignia, 1942–1948 ==
1st Grade		2nd Grade	3rd Grade		4th Grade		5th Grade		6th Grade	7th Grade
										No Insignia
Master sergeant	First sergeant	Technical sergeant	Staff sergeant	Technician third grade	Sergeant	Technician fourth grade	Corporal	Technician fifth grade	Private first class	Private
M/Sgt.	1st Sgt.	T/Sgt.	S/Sgt.	T/3	Sgt.	T/4	Cpl.	T/5	Pfc.	Pvt.

=== Technicians ===
On 8 January 1942, under War Department Circular No. 5, the ranks of technician third grade (T/3), technician fourth grade (T/4), and technician fifth grade (T/5) were created. The existing specialist ranks were abolished effective 1 June 1942 by War Department Circular No. 204, and all personnel ranked as such were disrated and reappointed as follows:

Old specialist rank	New technician rank
Private first class, specialist first class	Technician fourth grade
Private, specialist first class	Technician fourth grade
Private first class, specialist second class	Technician fourth grade
Private, specialist second class	Technician fourth grade
Private first class, specialist third class	Technician fourth grade
Private first class, specialist third class	Technician fifth grade
Private first class, specialist fourth class	Technician fifth grade
Private, specialist fourth class	Technician fifth grade

The ranks of specialist fifth class and specialist sixth class were also discontinued, and the men who ranked as such were paid according to their rank as privates first class or privates, respectively. Initially, the technician ranks used the same insignia as staff sergeant, sergeant, and corporal, respectively, but on 4 September 1942, Change 1 to Army Regulation 600-35 added a "T" for "technician" underneath the standard chevron design that corresponded with that grade. A technician was generally not addressed as such, but rather as the equivalent noncommissioned rank in its pay grade (T/5 as corporal; T/4 as sergeant; T/3 as sergeant or staff sergeant). Initially, technicians held the same authority as noncommissioned officers of their grade, but the Army declared in late 1943 amid a surplus of ranking noncommissioned officers in certain units originating from this policy that only technicians who were appointed prior to 1 December 1943 would continue to keep the authority of their respective grades; men appointed after would still draw the pay of their equivalent noncommissioned officer rank, but would only have the authority of privates.

The technician ranks were removed from the rank system in 1948. The concept was brought back with specialist ranks in 1955.

=== First sergeant ===
On September 22, 1942, in Change 3 to Army Regulation 600–35, the rank of first sergeant was increased from the 2nd grade to the 1st grade in pay. The insignia was changed to add a third rocker to match the other 1st grade rank, master sergeant.

== Abbreviations ==
As seen in the comparative chart below, the U.S. Army ranks during World War II were not abbreviated the same as they currently are today having all letters capitalized. Rather, only the first letter was capitalized, followed by the rest of the abbreviated word in the lower case, and a period to indicate it as being an abbreviation. In some cases, two or more letters were capitalized with a slash mark after the first letter to indicate that there was more than one word in the full title of the rank. See the comparative chart below.

=== Comparative chart ===
Some ranks are not included in the chart for a proper comparison.

Full title	Current abbreviation	World War II abbreviation
Private	PVT	Pvt.
Private first class	PFC	Pfc.
Corporal	SPC/CPL	Cpl.
Sergeant	SGT	Sgt.
Staff sergeant	SSG	S/Sgt.
Sergeant first class	SFC	T/Sgt.
First sergeant	1SG	1st Sgt.
Master sergeant	MSG	M/Sgt.
Command sergeant major / Sergeant major	CSM/SGM	Rank not used

== See also ==
- Comparative officer ranks of World War II
- List of ranks used by the United States Army
- United States Army enlisted rank insignia
- United States Army enlisted rank insignia of World War I
- United States Army officer rank insignia
- United States Army uniforms in World War II

== General sources ==
- Lieutenant Colonel Robert Alexander McDonald biography
- Rank, Enlisted, U.S. Army entry from the Saving Private Ryan online encyclopedia
