= Technician fifth grade =

United States Army rank

- The T/5 insignia of a letter "T" below two chevrons.
- Country: United States
- Service branch: United States Army
- Abbreviation: T/5 or Tec 5
- Rank group: Enlisted
- Pay grade: 5th Grade
- Formation: 26 January 1942
- Abolished: 1 August 1948
- Next higher rank: Technician fourth grade
- Next lower rank: Private first class
- Equivalent ranks: Corporal

Technician fifth grade (abbreviated T/5 or Tec 5) was a rank of the United States Army from 1942 to 1948. The rank was created to recognize enlisted soldiers with special technical skills, but who were not trained as combat leaders.

== History ==
The rank of technician fifth grade was authorized on 26 January 1942, per Executive Order No. 9041, and was adopted by the Army effective 1 June 1942. The rank insignia was finalized on 4 September 1942, adding a block "T" below the existing two chevrons. Those who held the rank of T/5 were addressed as "corporal," the same as the corresponding non-commissioned officer at the same pay grade.

Technicians represented a wide variety of soldiers with specialized technical skills, including medics, radio operators and repairmen, mail clerks, mechanics, cooks, musicians, and tank drivers. Initially, the three technician ranks held non-commissioned officer status. However, as technicians received no formal NCO leadership training or qualifications, their entrance into the NCO ranks resulted in organizational confusion, dilution of the NCO corps, and lowered morale among senior NCOs. Consequently, the Army revoked NCO status from technicians in November 1943.

The technician ranks were removed from the U.S. Army rank system on 1 August 1948, though the concept was revived with the specialist ranks in 1955.

== See also ==
- United States Army enlisted rank insignia of World War II
