= 442nd Infantry Regiment =

Infantry regiment of the United States Army

442nd Regimental Combat Team
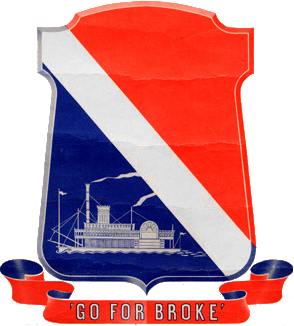
- Historic distinctive unit insignia of the 442d RCT
- Active: 1944–1946
- Country: United States
- Branch: United States Army
- Type: Regimental combat team (historical)
- Role: Infantry
- Size: ~4,000
- Nickname: Purple Heart Battalion belongs to the 100th Infantry Battalion (Separate)
- Motto: "Go For Broke"
- Colors: Blue and white
- Engagements: World War II; Naples-Foggia; Rome-Arno; Southern France; Rhineland; Northern Apennines; Central Europe; Po Valley

Commanders
- Notable commanders: Col Charles W. Pence; Col Virgil R. Miller

Insignia
- Shoulder sleeve insignia

The 442nd Infantry Regiment was an infantry regiment of the United States Army. The regiment including the 100th Infantry Battalion is best known as the most decorated unit in U.S. military history, and as a fighting unit composed almost entirely of second-generation American soldiers of Japanese ancestry (Nisei) who fought in World War II. Beginning in 1944, the regiment fought primarily in the European Theatre, in particular Italy, southern France, and Germany. The 442nd Regimental Combat Team (RCT) was organized on March 23, 1943, in response to the War Department's call for volunteers to form the segregated Japanese American army combat unit. More than 12,000 Nisei (second-generation Japanese American) volunteered. Ultimately 2,686 from Hawaii and 1,500 from mainland U.S. internment camps assembled at Camp Shelby, Mississippi in April 1943 for a year of infantry training. Many of the soldiers from the continental U.S. had families in internment camps while they fought abroad. Meaning to risk everything in order to achieve victory, the unit's motto was "Go For Broke". Before they left Mississippi, the 442nd was given permission to use the slogan it wanted, "Go For Broke," the shooters' cry to "shoot the works."

Created as the 442nd Regimental Combat Team when it was activated 1 February 1943, the unit quickly grew to its fighting complement of about 4,000 men by April 1943, and an eventual total of about 10,000 men served in the combined 100th Infantry Battalion and 442nd RCT. The combined units earned, in less than two years, more than 4,000 Purple Hearts and 4,000 Bronze Star Medals. The unit was awarded seven Presidential Unit Citations (seven between 1944 and 1946, five earned in one month). Twenty-one of its members were awarded the Medal of Honor. In 2010, Congress approved the granting of the Congressional Gold Medal to the 442nd Regimental Combat Team and associated units who served during World War II, and in 2012, all surviving members were made chevaliers of the French Légion d'Honneur for their actions contributing to the liberation of France and their heroic rescue of the Lost Battalion.

Arriving in the European Theatre, the 442nd Regimental Combat Team, with its second and third infantry battalions, one artillery battalion and associated HQ and service companies, was attached to the 34th Infantry Division. On 11 June 1944, near Civitavecchia, Italy, the 100th Infantry Battalion, another all-Nisei fighting unit which had already been in combat since September 1943, was transferred from the 133rd Infantry Regiment to the 442nd Regimental Combat Team. Because of its combat record, the 100th was allowed to keep their original designation as the 100th Infantry Battalion. The related 522nd Field Artillery Battalion liberated at least one of the satellite labor camps of Dachau concentration camp and saved survivors of a death march near Waakirchen.

Nearly a century later, "the "Remember Pearl Harbor" 100th Infantry Battalion, and the "Go For Broke" 442d Regimental Combat Team is still the most decorated unit in U.S. military history. Members of this World War II unit earned over 18,000 individual decorations including over 4,000 Purple Hearts, and 21 Medals of Honor. The Combat Team earned five Presidential Citations in 20 days of Rhineland fighting, the only military unit ever to claim that achievement. General of the Army George C. Marshall praised the team saying, "they were superb: the men of the 100/442d... showed rare courage and tremendous fighting spirit... everybody wanted them." General Mark W. Clark (Fifth Army) said, "these are some the best... fighters in the U.S. Army. If you have more, send them over.""

The 442nd RCT was inactivated in 1946 and reactivated as a reserve battalion in 1947, garrisoned at Shafter Flats, Hawaii. The 442nd lives on through the 100th Battalion/442nd Infantry Regiment, and is the only current infantry formation in the Army Reserve. More information about the current 100th Battalion/442nd Infantry Regiment and its current alignment with the active 25th Infantry Division, the reserve 9th Mission Support Command, and its combat duty in the Vietnam War and the Iraq War can be found at 100th Infantry Battalion (United States).

The 100th/442nd's current members carry on the honors and traditions of the historical unit. In recognition of its storied combat record, the 100th/442nd was also one of the last units allowed to use its individual shoulder sleeve insignia.

== Background ==
Most Japanese Americans who fought in World War II were Nisei, born in the United States to immigrant parents. Shortly after the Imperial Japanese Navy's attack on Pearl Harbor on 7 December 1941, Japanese-American men were initially categorized as 4C (enemy alien) and therefore not subject to the draft. On 19 February 1942, President Franklin D. Roosevelt signed Executive Order 9066, which authorized the Secretary of War to prescribe military areas in such places and of such extent as he or the appropriate Military Commander may determine, from which any or all persons may be excluded, and with respect to which, the right of any person to enter, remain in, or leave shall be subject to whatever restrictions the Secretary of War or the appropriate Military Commander may impose in his discretion.

Although the order did not refer specifically to people of Japanese ancestry, it was targeted largely for the internment of people of Japanese ancestry from the West Coast. In March 1942, Lieutenant General John L. DeWitt, head of the Western Defense Command and Fourth Army, issued the first of 108 military proclamations that resulted in the forced relocation from their residences to guarded concentration camps of more than 110,000 people of Japanese ancestry from the West Coast, the great majority of the ethnic community. Two-thirds were born in the United States.

In Hawaii, the military imposed martial law, complete with curfews and blackouts. As a large portion of the population was of Japanese ancestry (150,000 out of 400,000 people in 1937), internment was deemed not practical; it was strongly opposed by the island's business community, which was heavily dependent on the labor force of those of Japanese ancestry (this contrasts with the business communities on the mainland that competed with Japanese American businesses, and which exploited the opportunity to buy up Japanese American properties that had to be surrendered). It was accurately believed that an internment of Japanese Americans and Japanese immigrants in Hawaii would have had catastrophic results for the Hawaiian economy; intelligence reports at the time noted that "the Japanese, through a concentration of effort in select industries, had achieved essential roles in several key sectors of the economy in Hawaii." In addition, other reports indicated that those of Japanese descent in Hawaii "had access to virtually all jobs in the economy, including high-status, high-paying jobs (e.g., professional and managerial jobs)," suggesting that a mass internment of people of Japanese descent in Hawaii would have negatively impacted every sector of the Hawaiian economy. When the War Department called for the removal of all soldiers of Japanese ancestry from active service in early 1942, General Delos C. Emmons, commander of the U.S. Army in Hawaii, decided to discharge those in the Hawaii Territorial Guard, which was composed mainly of ROTC students from the University of Hawaii. However, he permitted the more than 1,300 Japanese-American soldiers of the 298th and 299th Infantry Regiments of the Hawaii National Guard to remain in service. The discharged members of the Hawaii Territorial Guard petitioned General Emmons to allow them to assist in the war effort. The petition was granted and they formed a group called the Varsity Victory Volunteers (VVV), which performed various military construction jobs. General Emmons, worried about the loyalty of Japanese-American soldiers in the event of a Japanese invasion, recommended to the War Department that those in the 298th and 299th Regiments be organized into a "Hawaiian Provisional Battalion" and sent to the mainland. The move was authorized, and on 5 June 1942, the Hawaiian Provisional Battalion set sail for training. They landed at Oakland, California on 12 June 1942, where the battalion was designated the 100th Infantry Battalion (Separate) — the "One Puka Puka" (Puka means "hole" in Hawaiian) — and sent to Camp McCoy, Wisconsin.

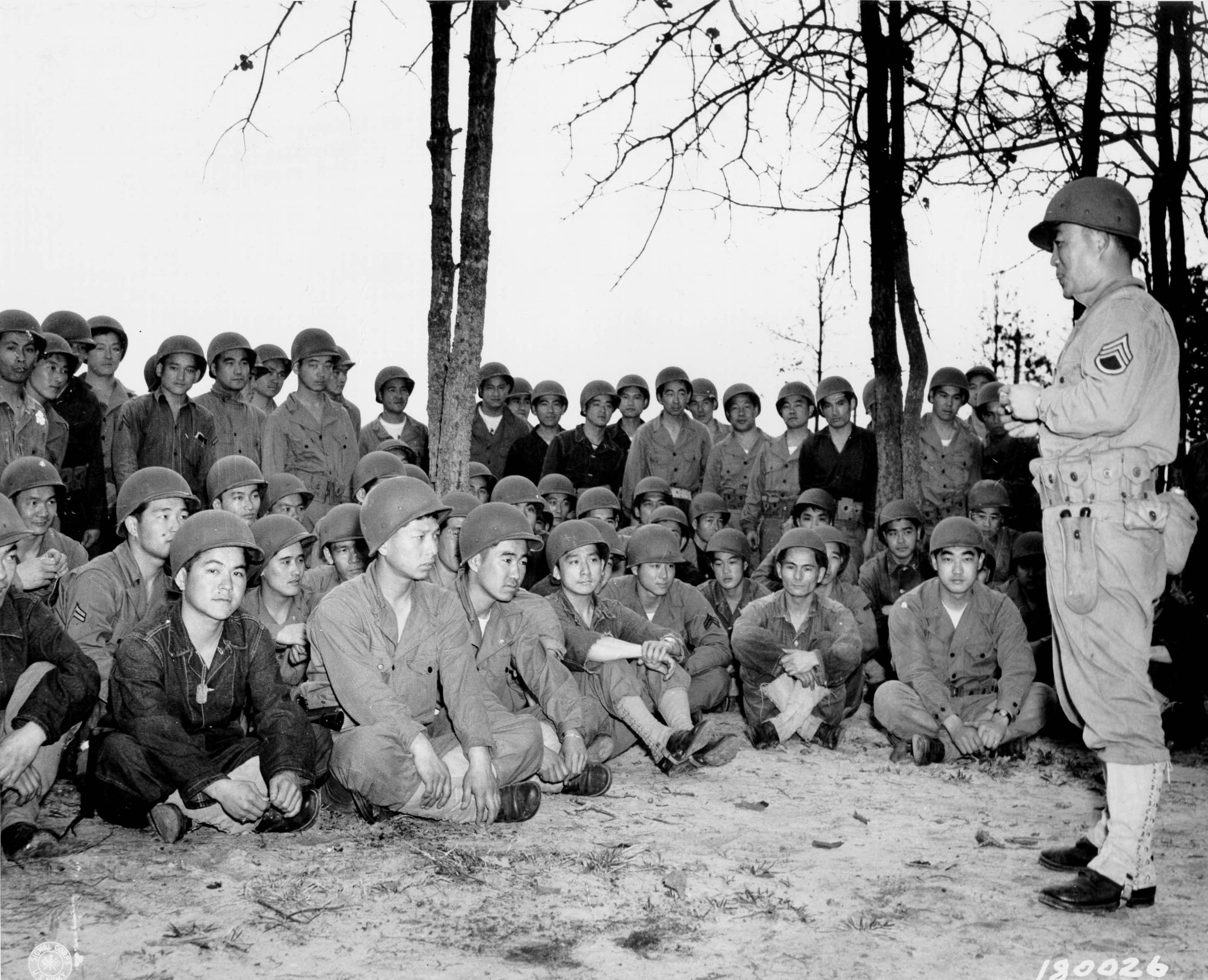
100th Infantry soldiers receiving grenade training in 1943

Mainly because of the outstanding training record of the 100th and the accomplishments of the VVV, the War Department directed that a Japanese-American Combat Team should be activated comprising the 442nd Infantry Regiment, the 522nd Field Artillery Battalion, and the 232nd Engineer Combat Company.

The order dated 22 January 1943, directed, "All cadre men must be American citizens of Japanese ancestry who have resided in the United States since birth" and "Officers of field grade and captains furnished under the provisions of subparagraphs a, b and c above, will be white American citizens. Other officers will be of Japanese ancestry insofar as practicable."

In accordance with those orders, the 442nd Combat Team was activated 1 February 1943, by General Orders, Headquarters Third Army. Colonel Charles W. Pence took command, with Lieutenant Colonel Merritt B. Booth as executive officer. Lieutenant Colonel Keith K. Tatom commanded the 1st Battalion, Lieutenant Colonel James M. Hanley the 2nd Battalion, and Lieutenant Colonel Sherwood Dixon the 3rd Battalion. Lieutenant Colonel Baya M. Harrison commanded the 522nd Field Artillery, and Captain Pershing Nakada commanded the 232nd Engineers.

Colonel Charles W. Pence, a World War I veteran and military science professor, commanded the regiment until he was wounded during the rescue of the "Lost Battalion" in October 1944. He was then replaced by Lieutenant Colonel Virgil R. Miller.

The US government required that all internees answer a loyalty questionnaire, which was used to register the Nisei for the draft. Question 27 of the questionnaire asked eligible males, "Are you willing to serve in the armed forces of the United States on combat duty, wherever ordered?" and question 28 asked, "Will you swear unqualified allegiance to the United States of America and faithfully defend the United States from any or all attack by foreign or domestic forces, and forswear any form of allegiance or obedience to the Japanese emperor, or any other foreign government, power or organization?"

Nearly a quarter of the Nisei males gave no answer, gave a qualified answer, or answered "No" to both questions, some resenting the implication they ever had allegiance to Japan. Qualified answers included those who wrote "Yes", but criticized the internment of the Japanese or racism. Many who responded that way were imprisoned for evading the draft. Such refusal is the subject of a postwar novel, No-No Boy. But more than 75% indicated that they were willing to enlist and to swear unqualified allegiance to the United States. The U.S. Army called for 1,500 volunteers from Hawaii and 3,000 from the mainland. An overwhelming 10,000 men from Hawaii volunteered. The announcement was met with less enthusiasm on the mainland, where most draft-age men of Japanese ancestry and their families were being held in concentration camps. The Army revised the quota, calling for 2,900 men from Hawaii, and 1,500 from the mainland. Only 1,256 volunteered from the mainland during this initial call for volunteers. As a result, around 3,000 men from Hawaii and 800 men from the mainland were inducted.

Roosevelt announced the formation of the 442nd Infantry Regimental Combat Team, saying, "Americanism is not, and never was, a matter of race or ancestry." Ultimately, the draft was reinstated to obtain more Japanese Americans from the mainland to become part of the 10,000 men who eventually served in the 100th Infantry Battalion and 442nd Regiment.

== 232nd Engineer Combat Company ==
The 232nd Engineer Combat Company was a unit from the 442nd Regimental Combat Team. Activated on February 7, 1943, at Camp Shelby, Mississippi, the 232nd was unique in that it was the only company in the United States Army that was made up entirely of Japanese Americans; the company was the first in the nation's history to be led by Nisei officers, with Captain Pershing Nakada taking command. The 232nd was small with the company consisting of around 204 enlisted men, 7 Nisei officers, and Nakada himself. The role of the combat engineers in the 232nd relied heavily on maintaining supply and communication lines for the army. In doing so, men of the 232nd swept the area for mines, built fortifications, constructed bridges and roads. After the completion of basic training, the 232nd would arrive in Italy on May 28, 1944, alongside the 442nd RCT. In July, Under the command of the 34th Infantry Division, the 232nd was tasked to remove German landmines placed along the roads leading to the town of Luciana.

Apart from sweeping landmines, the engineers had the other job of clearing a path for the infantry to pass. On October 15, 1944, the 232nd encountered a roadblock of logs and trees near Bruyères, France. The men were tasked to clear the quarter-mile stretch of debris in order to establish a route for troop evacuation and supply. As the men worked, they faced enemy fire from four German machine gun nests. Prior to returning to the task of clearing the road, the 232nd with the help from the 100th Infantry Battalion engaged the German machine gun nests. With all four machine gun nests down, the 232nd spent around 8 1/2 hours defusing landmines and removing fallen trees from the road before Allied infantry could push forward.

In August 1944, the 232nd helped aid the Allied preparation to cross the Arno River. Prior to the crossing, the engineers of the 232nd cleared hundreds of mines along the path. Once the way was clear for troops to cross the bridge and secure the bridgeheads, the 232nd were then tasked to construct bridges for Allied vehicles and tanks to cross. The 232nd was also commissioned in assisting in the Po Valley Campaign. Taking place between Massa and Carrara, the 232nd were tasked with opening up crucial evacuation and supply lines. The obstacle that stood in the way of the 232nd clearing the lines was a large trench that was around 30 yards long.To make matters worse many more barriers stood in the way of the opening including mines, German troops, as well as other artillery munitions and enemy fire.

The 232nd was also present in the Champagne campaign, taking place in Southern France. During the Champagne campaign, the 232nd found themselves in a different setting where they were able to recover a two-man enemy submarine out of the water that was primarily used for reconnaissance and firing torpedoes at Allied ships. The 232nd was also tasked with similar objectives, of clearing the way for other battalions to be able to push forward in terms of removing mines and other obstacles. While on guard duty at a fort on Mt. Grosse with other companies, there was news that there was an enemy axis fort in the vicinity of the Allies.

Operating during the night time in January 1945, the 232nd disarmed numerous enemy mines and, in their place, laid 33 of their own. The 232nd also were able to put up over 10,000 yards of barbed wire as well as trip flares, mines and filling sandbags in a time frame that took place from December 1944-March 1945. In the Vosges-Rhineland Campaign, the 232nd's job list was the same with some added responsibilities. Alongside the 522nd battalion, many 232nd troops also participated in more combat than originally intended, instead of only supplying defense cover and locating mines. In addition to fighting side by side with the 522nd battalion, the 232nd encountered numerous challenges. The 232nd was faced with roadblocks raised by the Axis forces as well as mines known as R- and S-mines. In addition to these explosive hazards, the Germans also set up a variety of booby traps. These defenses proved ineffective for the 232nd as they worked to remove the Axis defenses swiftly and efficiently while taking on heavy enemy fire and risk of mines exploding.

== Training and organization ==
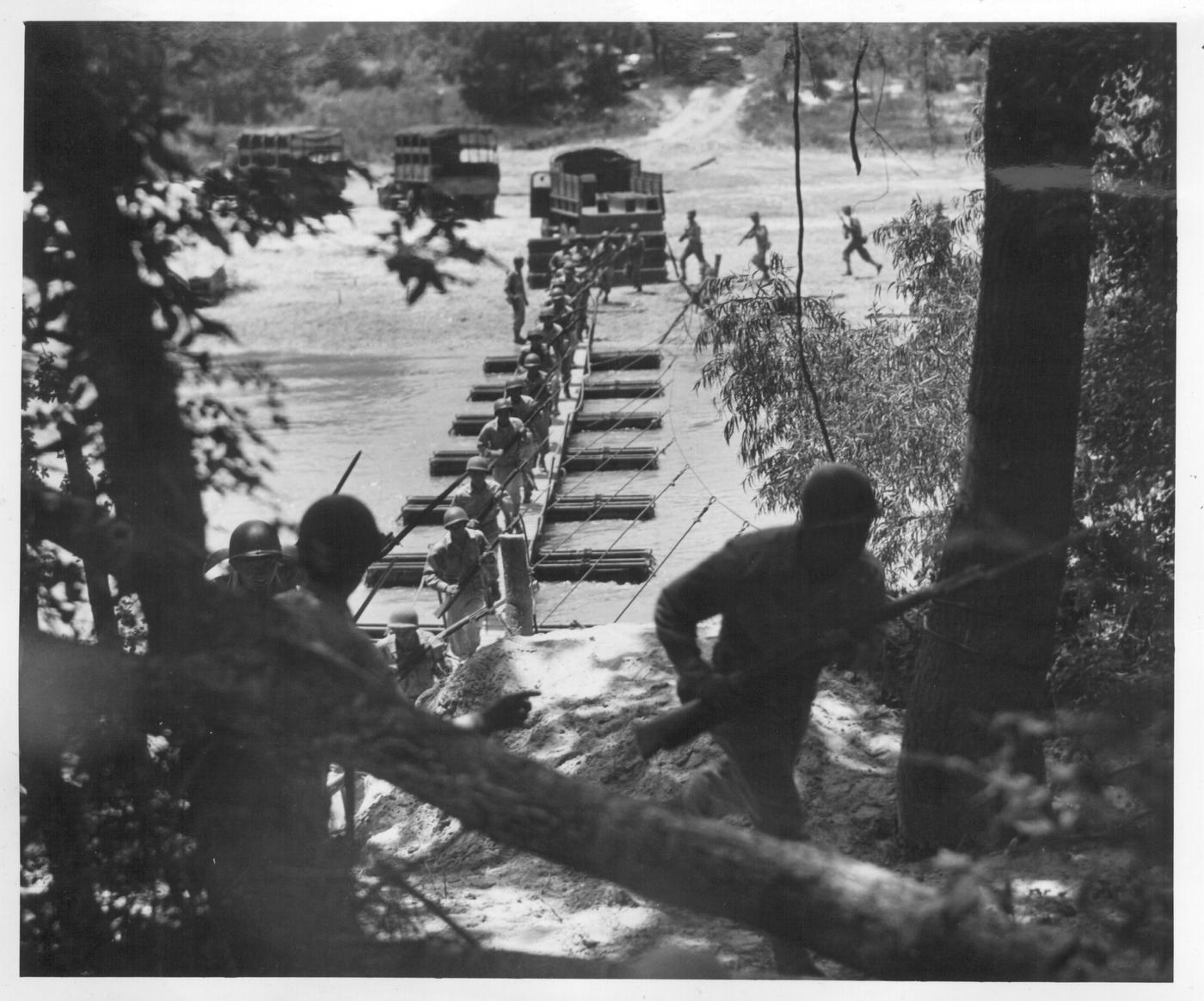
442nd recruits building then attacking across a pontoon bridge at Camp Shelby

The 100th Infantry Battalion relocated to Camp Shelby in Mississippi where it went through advanced training. The 442nd RCT began basic training in April 1943 with 3,000 volunteers from Hawaii and 800 from the mainland internment camps. As a regimental combat team (RCT), the 442nd RCT was a self-sufficient fighting formation of three infantry battalions (1st, 2nd, and 3rd Battalions, 442nd Infantry), the 522nd Field Artillery Battalion, the 232nd Engineer Company, an anti-tank company, cannon company, service company, medical detachment, headquarters companies, and the 206th Army Band.

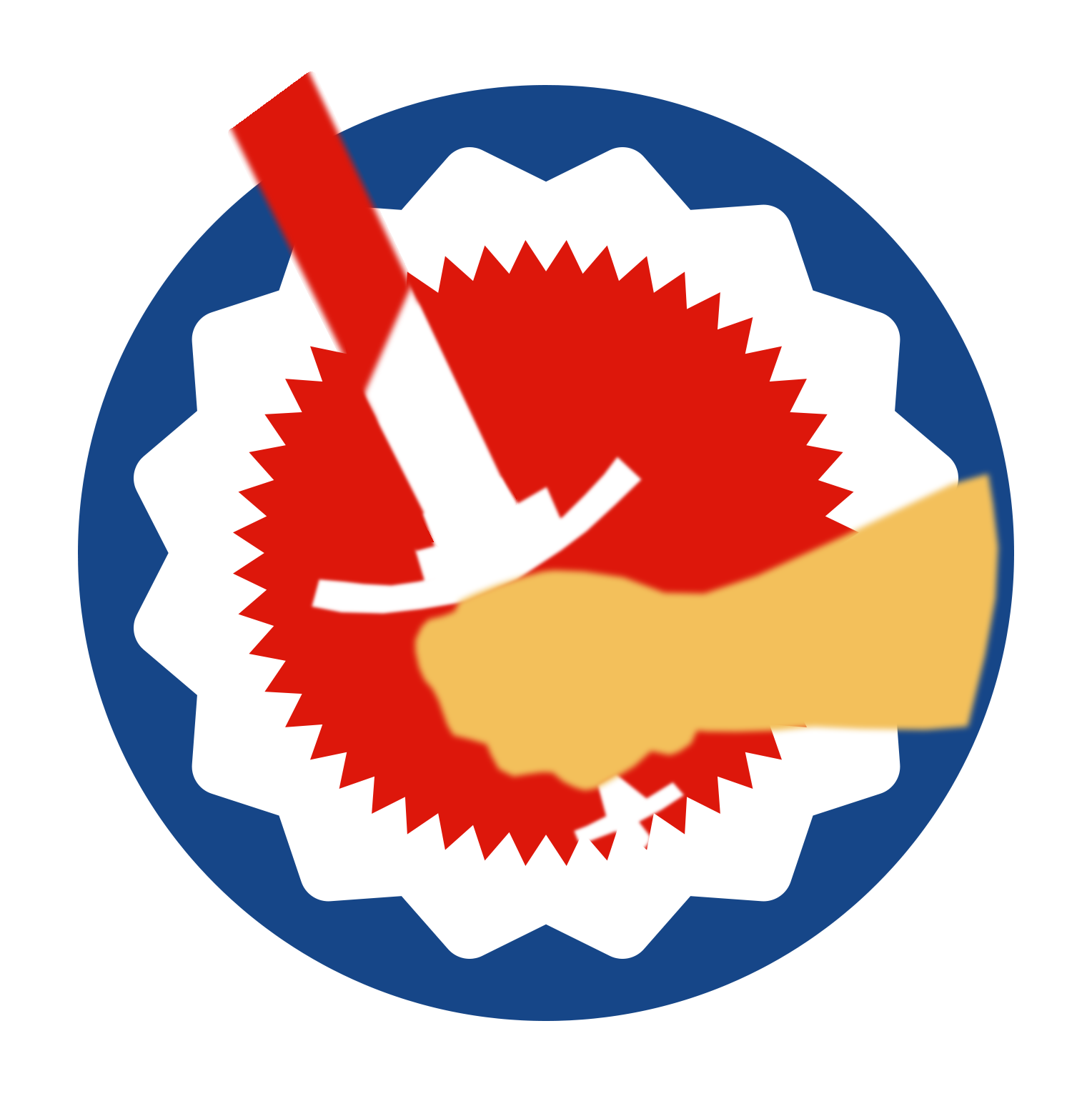
Approved on July 31, 1943, the original patch was met with protests by the soldiers of the 442nd. Mitch Miyamoto, a soldier of the 3rd Battalion created a new design, which was approved on December 16, 1943.

Although they were permitted to volunteer to fight, Americans of Japanese ancestry were generally forbidden to fight in combat in the Pacific Theater. No such limitations were placed on Americans of German or Italian ancestry, who were assigned to units fighting against the Axis powers in the European Theater. There were many more German and Italian Americans than Japanese Americans, and their political and economic power reduced the restrictions against them. Many men deemed proficient enough in the Japanese language were approached, or sometimes ordered, to join the Military Intelligence Service (MIS) to serve as translators/interpreters and spies in the Pacific, as well as in the China Burma India Theater. These men were sent to the MIS Language School at Camp Savage, Minnesota to develop their language skills and receive training in military intelligence. While the 442nd trained in Mississippi, the 100th departed for Oran in North Africa to join the forces destined to invade Italy.

== Reunion with the 100th ==
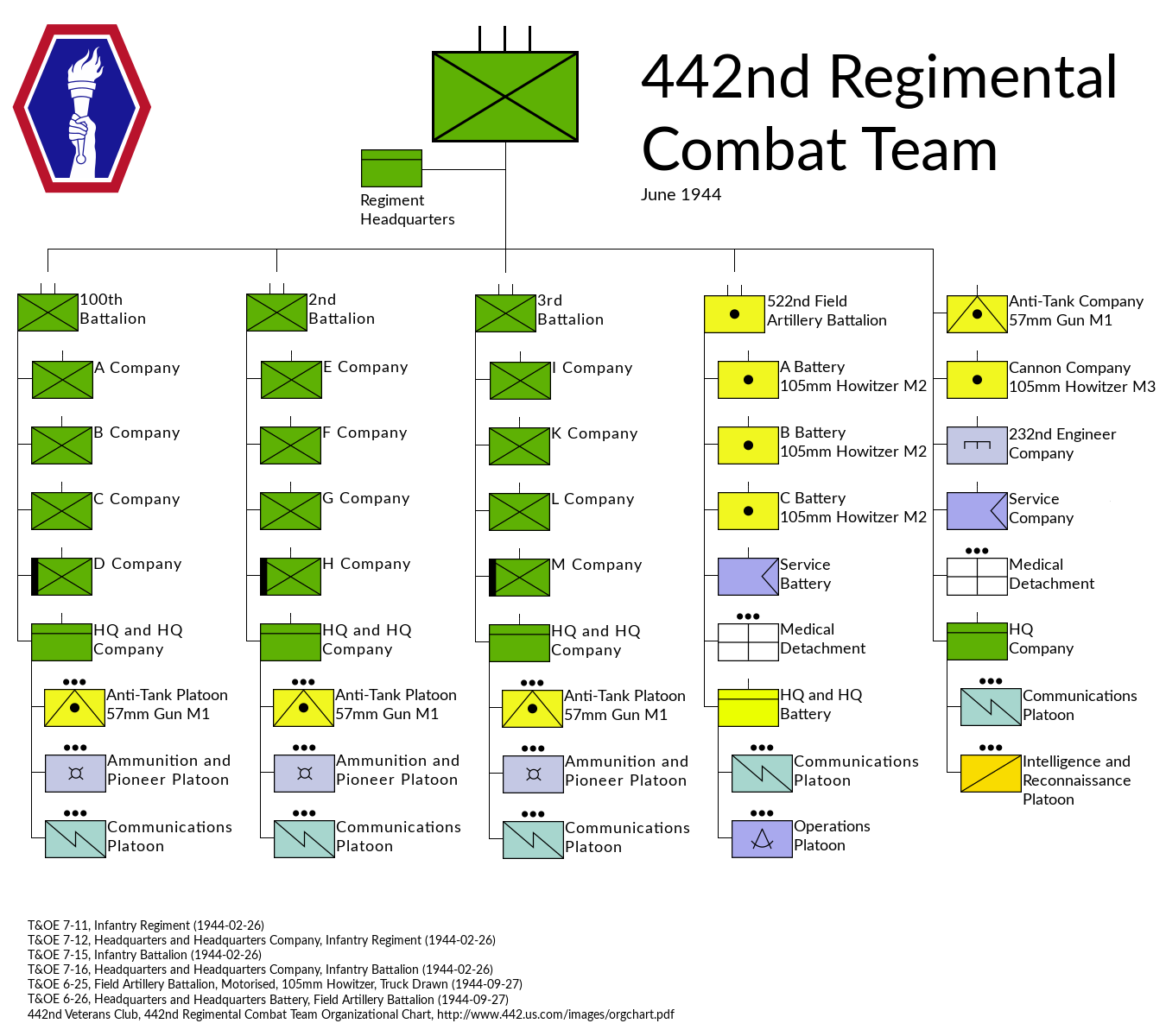
Organization chart of the 442nd RCT after its reunion with the 100th Battalion in 1944

In late 1943 and early 1944, calls for replacements for the 100th Infantry Battalion began to come in after the unit became embroiled in fierce fighting during the Allied invasion of Italy and the subsequent Battle of Monte Cassino. The 442nd Combat Team was levied for replacements for the 100th; the 1st Battalion was subsequently depleted by transfers to bring the 2nd and 3rd Battalions to full strength. On 1 May 1944, the 442nd Combat Team, less the 1st Battalion, sailed from Hampton Roads, Virginia and landed at Anzio on 28 May. The depleted 1st Battalion was left behind at Camp Shelby to be used as an orientation and training unit for volunteers who had received basic infantry training at Camp Blanding, Florida. The 442nd would join the 100th Battalion in Civitavecchia north of Rome on 11 June 1944, attached to the 34th Infantry Division. The 100th was placed under the command of the 442nd on 15 June 1944 but on 14 August 1944, the 100th Battalion was officially assigned to the 442nd as its 1st battalion, but was allowed to keep its unit designation in recognition of its distinguished fighting record. The 1st Battalion, 442nd Infantry at Camp Shelby was redesignated the 171st Infantry Battalion (Separate) on 5 September 1944. The 100th Battalion's high casualty rate at Monte Cassino earned it the unofficial nickname "Purple Heart Battalion."

== First battle, Belvedere di Suvereto ==
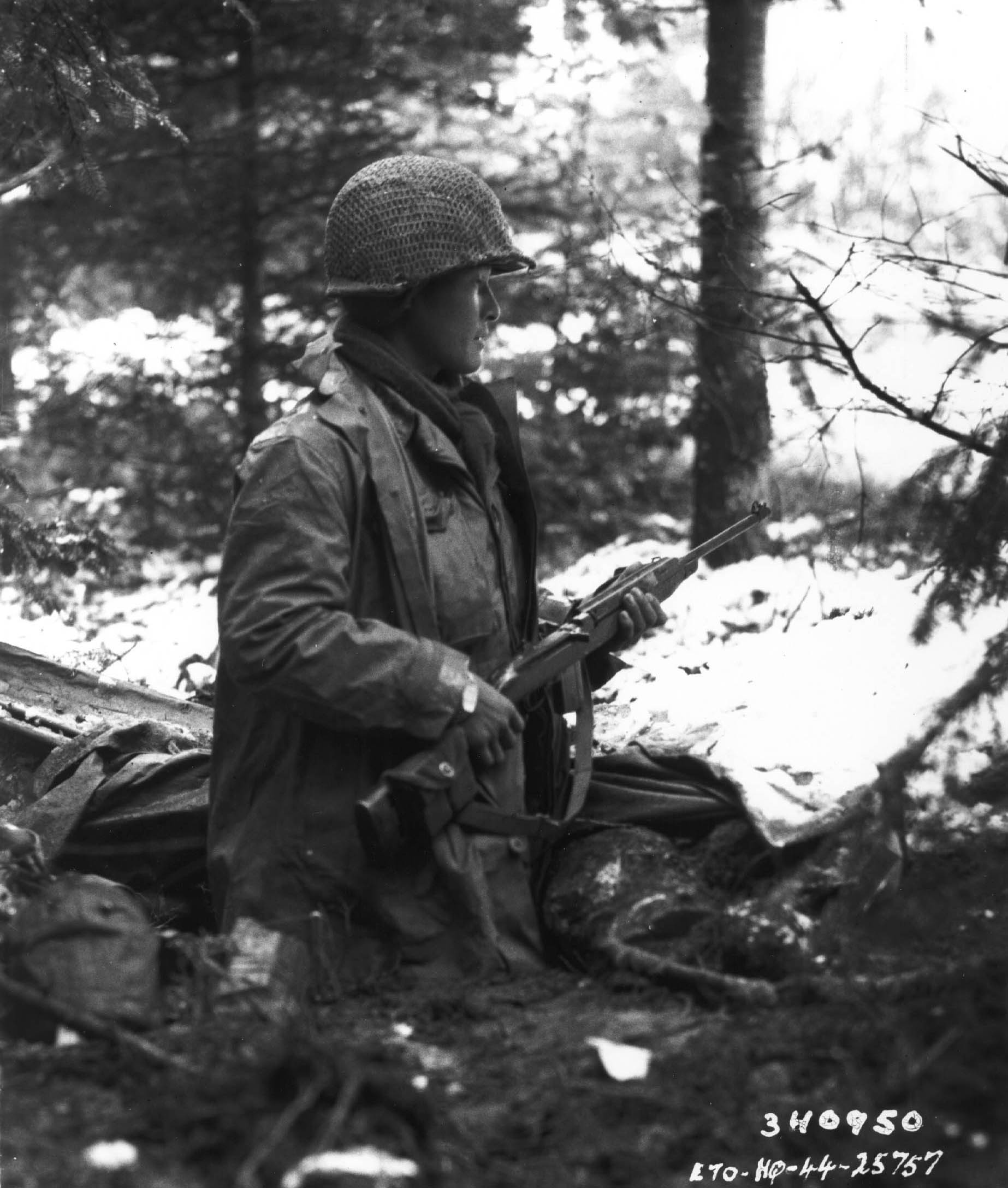
A 442nd RCT squad leader, Sergeant Goichi Suehiro, checks for German units in France in November 1944.

The newly formed Nisei unit went into battle together on 26 June 1944 at the hamlet of Belvedere in Suvereto, Tuscany. Although the 100th was attached to the 442nd, its actions earned it a separate Presidential Unit Citation. Second and Third Battalions were the first to engage the enemy, in a fierce firefight. F Company bore the worst fighting. A, B, and C Companies of the 100th were called into combat and advanced east using a covered route to reach the high ground northeast of Belvedere. The enemy did not know that the 100th was flanking the German exit, trapping them in Belvedere. C Company blocked the entrance while A Company blocked the exit. Meanwhile, the 442nd's 2nd Battalion was receiving a heavy barrage by the Germans from inside Belvedere, and the Germans remained unaware of their situation. B Company stayed on the high ground and conducted a surprise attack on the German battalion's exposed east flank, forcing the Germans to flee and run into C Company, which then drove the Germans to A Company.

All three companies went into action boldly facing murderous fire from all types of weapons and tanks and at times fighting without artillery support.... The stubborn desire of the men to close with a numerically superior enemy and the rapidity with which they fought enabled the 100th Infantry Battalion to destroy completely the right flank positions of a German Army.... The fortitude and intrepidity displayed by the officers and men of the 100th Infantry Battalion reflects the finest traditions of the Army of the United States. Presidential Unit Citation Review

The 442nd, along with its first battalion, the 100th, kept driving the enemy north, engaging in multiple skirmishes until they had passed Sassetta. The battle of Belvedere showed that the 442nd could hold their own and showed them the kind of fighting the 100th Battalion had gone through in the prior months. After only a few days of rest, the united 442nd again entered into combat on 1 July, taking Cecina and moving towards the Arno River. On 2 July, as the 442nd approached the Arno, 5th Battalion engaged in a hard-fought battle to take Hill 140, while on 7 July, the 100th fought for the town of Castellina Marittima.

== Hill 140 and Castellina ==
For the first three weeks of July, the 442nd and its 1st Battalion, the 100th, were constantly attacking German forces, leading to 1,100 enemy killed and 331 captured.

Hill 140 was the main line of enemy resistance. A single German battalion held the hill and, along with the help of artillery, had completely wiped out a machine-gun squad of L Company of the 3rd Battalion and G Company of 2nd Battalion except for its commander. A constant artillery barrage was launched against the 2nd and 3rd Battalions as they dug in at the hill's base. The 442nd gained very little ground in the coming days, improving their position only slightly. The 232nd Engineers aided the 442nd by defusing landmines that lay in the 442nd's path. The entire 34th Division front encountered heavy resistance. "All along the 34th Infantry Division Front the Germans held more doggedly than at any time since the breakthrough at Cassino and Anzio." Hill 140 had been dubbed "Little Cassino" as the resistance by the Germans was so fierce. "Hill 140, when the medics were just overrun with all the casualties; casualties you couldn't think to talk about." The 2nd Battalion moved to the eastern front of Hill 140 and 3rd Battalion moved to the western front, both converging on the German flanks. It wasn't until 7 July, when the last German resistance was overcome, that the hill came under the 34th Division's control.

On the day Hill 140 fell, the battle for the town of Castellina Marittima began. The 100th began its assault on the northwestern side of the town taking the high ground. Just before dawn, 2nd Platoon C Company moved into town, encountering heavy resistance and holding off multiple counterattacks by German forces. In the meantime, Company B moved north into Castellina, encountering heavy resistance as well. First, they helped defend 2nd and 3rd Battalions in the taking of Hill 140. Then, with the help of the 522nd Field Artillery, they laid down a heavy barrage and forced the Germans to retreat by 1800 hours on 7 July. The 100th dug in and waited for relief to arrive after spending an entire day securing the town.

The 442nd encountered heavy resistance from each town until 25 July, when they reached the Arno River, ending the Rome-Arno Campaign. The 100/442 suffered casualties of 1,272 men (17 missing, 44 non-combat injuries, 972 wounded, and 239 killed) in the process of advancing only 40 miles (64 km). They rested from 25 July to 15 August, when the 442nd moved to patrol the Arno. Crossing the Arno on 31 August was relatively uneventful, as they were guarding the north side of the river in order for bridges to be built. On 11 September the 442nd was detached from the Fifth Army and then attached to the 36th Infantry Division of the Seventh Army.

== Antitank Company ==
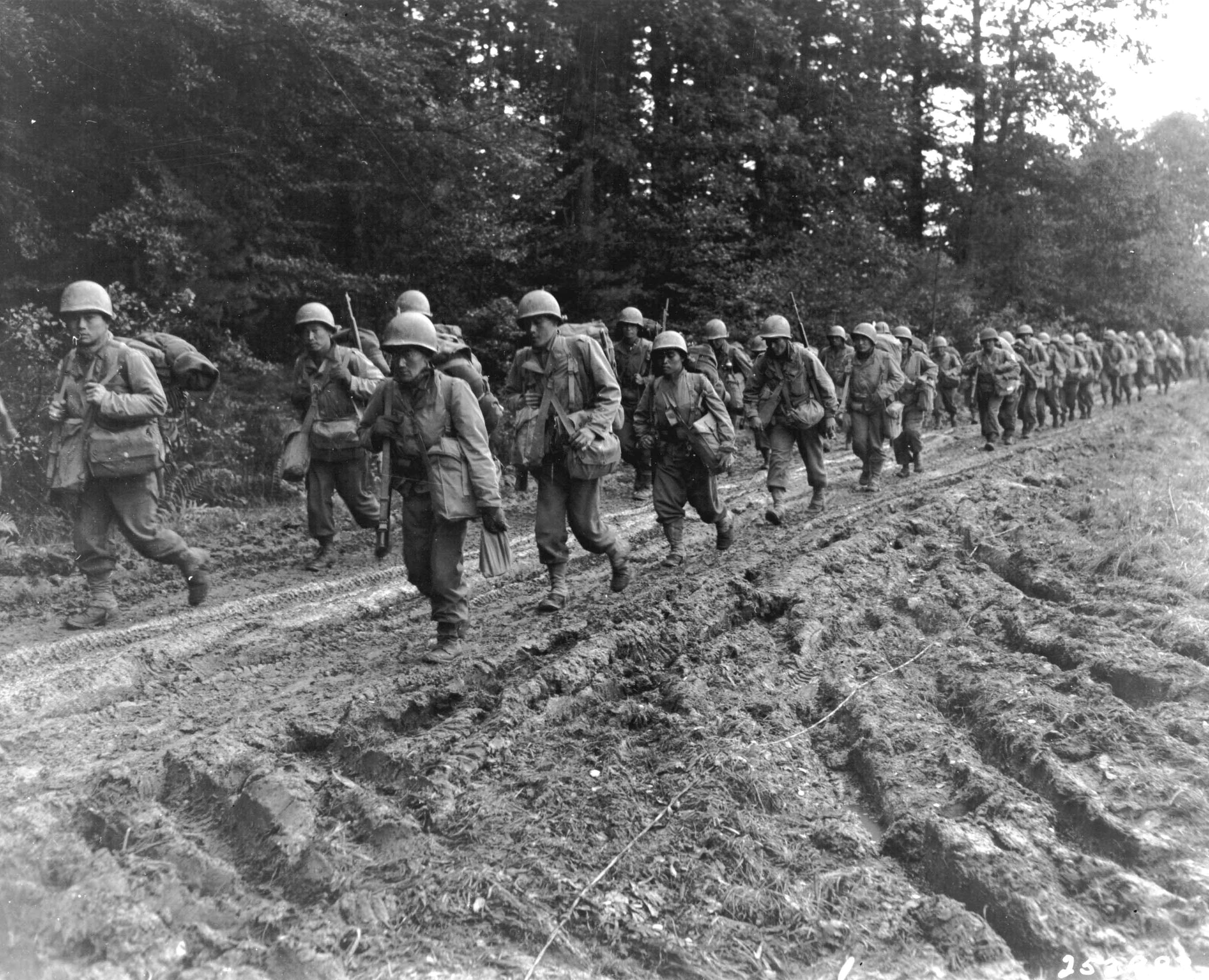
The 442nd Regimental Combat Team hiking up a muddy road in the Chambois Sector, France, in late 1944

On 15 July, the Antitank Company was pulled from the frontlines and placed with the 517th Parachute Infantry Regiment, 1st Airborne Task Force. They had trained at an airfield south of Rome to prepare for the invasion of Southern France which took place on 15 August, landing near Le Muy, France. They trained for a few weeks to get used to, prepare, properly load, and fly gliders. These gliders were 48 feet (15 m) long and 15 feet (4.6 m) high, and could hold a jeep and a trailer filled with ammunition, or a British six-pounder antitank gun. The Southern France Campaign, 15 August to 14 September, led the 442nd to its second Presidential Unit Citation for invading in gliders and the Combat Infantryman Badge for fighting with the infantrymen of the 7th Army. The soldiers of Antitank Company received the Glider Badge. After many rough landings by the gliders, hitting trees or enemy flak, they held their positions for a few days until relieved by Allied troops coming in by sea. For the next two months the Antitank Company guarded the exposed right flank of the Seventh Army and protected the 517th Parachute Infantry. The unit also cleared mines, captured Germans, and guarded roads and tunnels. In mid-to-late October, the Antitank Company rejoined the 442nd during the battle to find the "Lost Battalion."

== Vosges Mountains ==
After leaving Naples, the 442nd landed in Marseille on 30 September and for the next few weeks they traveled 500 miles (800 km) through the Rhone Valley, by walking and by boxcar, until 13 October. On 14 October 1944, the 442nd began moving into position in the late afternoon preparing the assault on Hills A, B, C, and D of Bruyères. Each hill was heavily guarded, as each hill was key in order to take and secure the city. Hill A was located Northwest of Bruyères, Hill B to the North, Hill C Northeast, and Hill D to the East. The 442nd had experienced mainly prairie in Italy, but the Vosges Mountains provided a very different terrain. The unit faced dense fog, mud, heavy rain, large trees, hills, and heavy enemy gunfire and artillery while moving through the Vosges. Hitler had ordered the German frontline to fight at all costs as this was the last barrier between the Allied forces and Germany. On 15 October 1944 the 442nd began its attack on Bruyères. The 100th Battalion moved on Hill A, which was held by the SS Polizei Regiment 19, as 2nd Battalion moved in on Hill B. Third Battalion was left to take Bruyères.

=== Bruyères ===
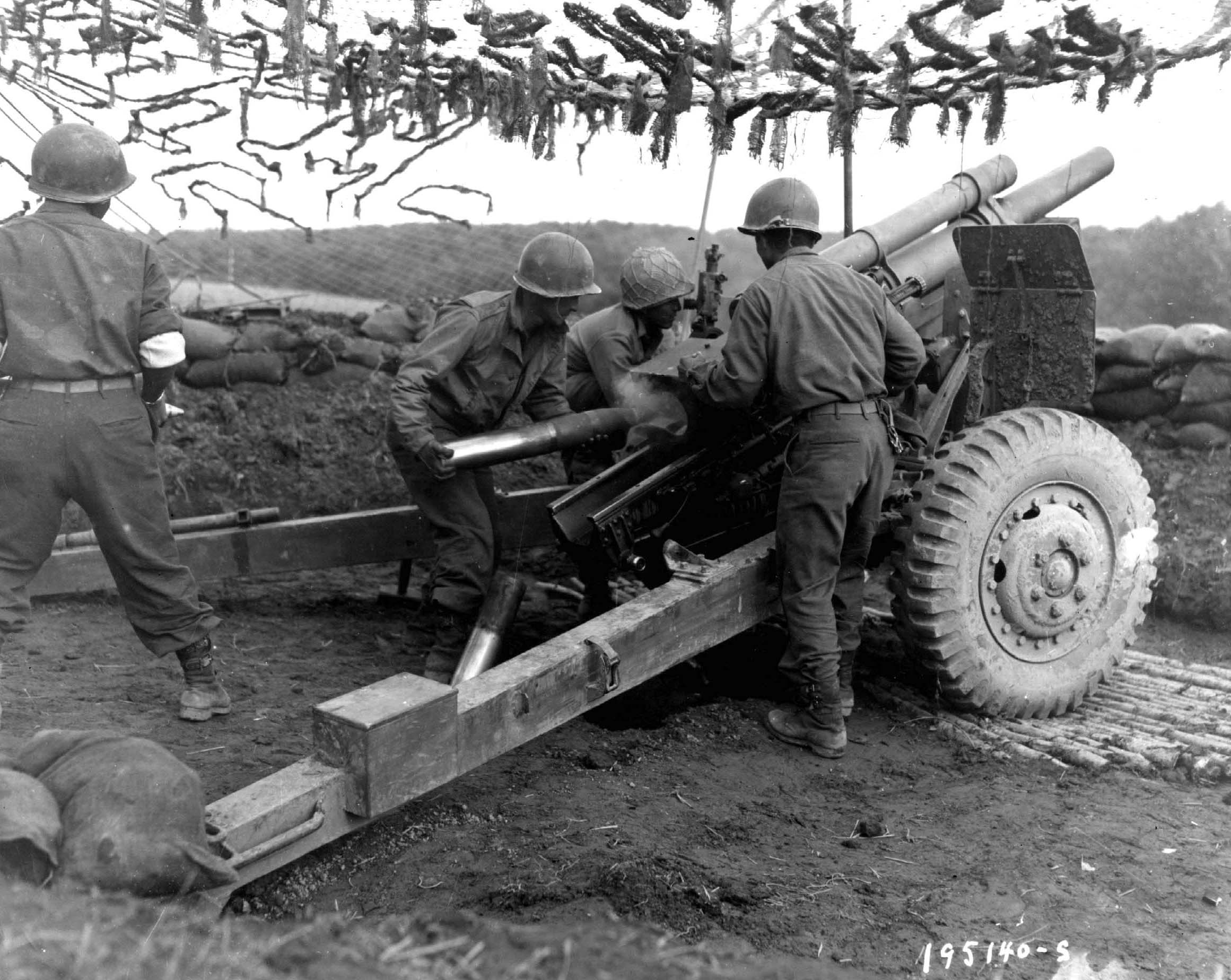
The 522nd Field Artillery Battalion fire 105mm shells in support of an infantry attack in Bruyères, France.

After heavy fighting dealing with enemy machine guns and snipers and a continuous artillery barrage placed onto the Germans, the 100th Battalion was eventually able to take Hill A by 3 a.m. on 18 October. 2nd Battalion took Hill B in a similar fashion only hours later. Once Hill A and B were secured, 3rd Battalion along with the 36th Infantry's 142nd Regiment began its assault from the south. After the 232nd broke through the concrete barriers around the town hall of Bruyères, the 442nd captured 134 Wehrmacht members including Poles, Yugoslavs, Somalis, East Indians of the Regiment "Freies Indien", 2nd and 3rd Company of Fusilier Battalion 198, Grenadier Regiment 736, and Panzer Grenadier Regiment 192. After three days of fighting Bruyères fell but was not yet secured. Germans on Hill C and D used that high ground to launch artillery barrages on the town; Hills C and D needed to be taken to secure Bruyères.

The 442nd initially took Hills C and D but did not secure them and they fell back into German hands. By noon of 19 October, Hill D was taken by 2nd and 3rd Battalions, who then were ordered to take a railroad embankment leaving Hill D unsecure. As the 100th began moving on Hill C on 20 October, German forces retook Hill D during the night. The 100th Battalion was ordered back to Bruyères into reserve, allowing a German force onto Hill C, surprising another American division arriving into position. Retaking Hill C cost another 100 casualties. Hill D fell back into Allied hands after a short time, finally securing the town. The 232nd Engineers had to dismantle roadblocks, clear away trees and clear mine fields all in the midst of the battle. The 100th rested, then was called to the battle for Biffontaine.

=== Biffontaine ===
The 100th was ordered to take the high ground but was eventually ordered to move into the town, leading to a bitter fight after the 100th were encircled by German forces: cut off from the 442nd, outside radio contact, and outside artillery support. The 100th were in constant battle from 22 October until dusk of 23 October, engaging in house to house fighting and defending against multiple counterattacks. 3rd Battalion of the 442nd reached the 100th and helped drive out the remaining German forces, handing Biffontaine to the 36th. On 24 October the 143rd Infantry of the 36th Division relieved the 100th and 3rd Battalion who were sent to Belmont, another small town to the north, for some short-lived rest. Nine days of constant fighting continued as they were then ordered to save T-Patchers, the 141st Regiment of the 36th Infantry, the "Lost Battalion."

== Lost Battalion ==
After less than two days in reserve, the 442nd was ordered to attempt the rescue of the "Lost Battalion" two miles east of Biffontaine. On 23 October Colonel Lundquist's 141st Regiment, soon to be known as the "Alamo" Regiment, had begun its attack on the German line that ran from Rambervillers to Biffontaine. Tuesday morning, 24 October, the left flank of the 141st, commanded by Technical Sergeant Charles H. Coolidge, had run into heavy action, fending off numerous German attacks throughout the days of 25 and 26 October. The right flank command post was overrun and 275 men of Lieutenant Colonel William Bird's 1st Battalion Companies A, B, C, and a platoon from Company D were cut off 2 kilometres (1.2 mi) behind enemy lines. The "Lost Battalion" was cut off by German troops and was forced to dig in until help arrived. It was nearly a week before they saw friendly soldiers.

At 4 a.m. on Friday 27 October, General John E. Dahlquist ordered the 442nd to move out and rescue the cut-off battalion. The 442nd had the support of the 522nd and 133rd Field Artillery units but at first made little headway against German General Richter's infantry and artillery front line. For the next few days the 442nd engaged in the heaviest fighting it had seen in the war, as the elements combined with the Germans to slow their advance. Dense fog and very dark nights prevented the men from seeing even twenty feet. Rainfall, snow, cold, mud, fatigue, trench foot, and even exploding trees plagued them as they moved deeper into the Vosges and closer to the German frontlines. The 141st continued fighting—in all directions.

When we realized we were cut off, we dug a circle at the top of the ridge. I had two heavy, water-cooled machine guns with us at this time, and about nine or ten men to handle them. I put one gun on the right front with about half of my men, and the other gun to the left. We cut down small trees to cover our holes and then piled as much dirt on top as we could. We were real low on supplies, so we pooled all of our food.

— SSgt. Jack Wilson of Newburgh, IN

Airdrops with ammo and food for the 141st were called off by dense fog or landed in German hands. Many Germans did not know that they had cut off an American unit. "We didn't know that we had surrounded the Americans until they were being supplied by air. One of the supply containers, dropped by parachute, landed near us. The packages were divided up amongst us." Only on 29 October was the 442nd told why they were being forced to attack the German front lines so intensely.

The fighting was intense for the Germans as well. Gebirgsjäger Battalion 202 from Salzburg was cut off from Gebirgsjager Battalion 201 from Garmisch. Both sides eventually rescued their cut-off battalions.

As the men of the 442nd went deeper and deeper they became more hesitant, until reaching the point where they would not move from behind a tree or come out of a foxhole. However, this all changed in an instant. The men of Companies I and K of 3rd Battalion had their backs against the wall, but as each one saw another rise to attack, then another also rose. Then every Nisei charged the Germans screaming, and many screaming "Banzai!" Through gunfire, artillery shells, and fragments from trees, and Nisei going down one after another, they charged.

Colonel Rolin's grenadiers put up a desperate fight, but nothing could stop the Nisei rushing up the steep slopes, shouting, firing from the hip, and lobbing hand grenades into dugouts. Finally, the German defenses broke, and the surviving grenadiers fled in disarray. That afternoon the American aid stations were crowded with casualties. The 2nd platoon of Company I had only two men left, and the 1st platoon was down to twenty." On the afternoon of 30 October 3rd Battalion broke through and reached the 141st, rescuing 211 T-Patchers at the cost of 800 men in five days. However, the fighting continued for the 442nd as they moved past the 141st. The drive continued until they reached Saint-Die on 17 November when they were finally pulled back. The 100th had fielded 1,432 men a year earlier but was now down to 239 infantrymen and 21 officers. Second Battalion was down to 316 riflemen and 17 officers, while not a single company in 3rd Battalion had over 100 riflemen; the entire 100th/442nd Regimental Combat Team was down to less than 800 soldiers. Earlier (on 13 October) when attached to the 36th Infantry, the unit had been at 2,943 riflemen and officers, thus in only three weeks 140 had been killed and a further 1,800 wounded, while 43 were missing.

== General Dahlquist's legacy ==
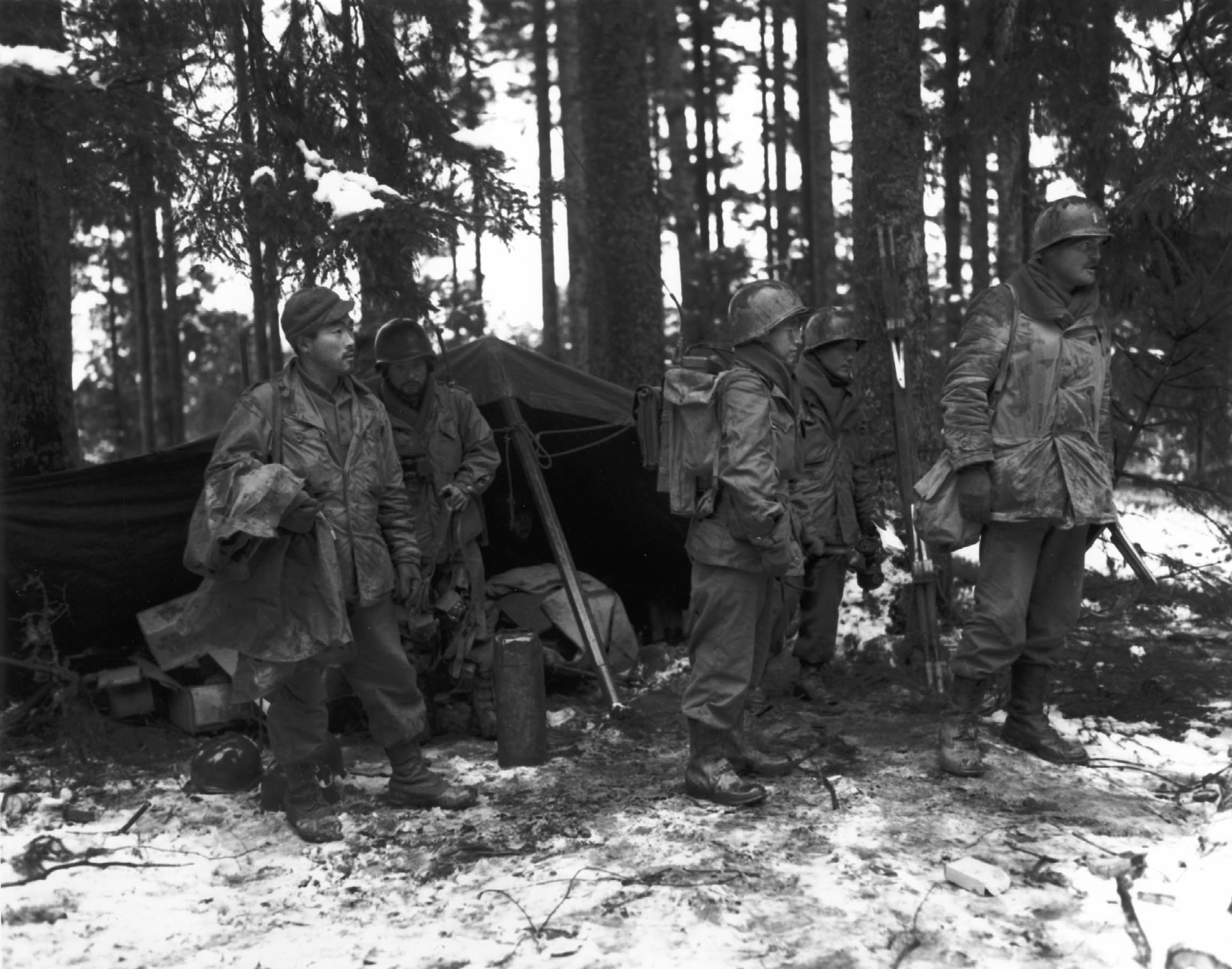
A Japanese-American unit moves out of its old command post. The unit, Company F, 2nd Battalion, 442nd Regimental Combat Team, is holding a section of the front lines near St. Die Area, France, 13 November 1944.

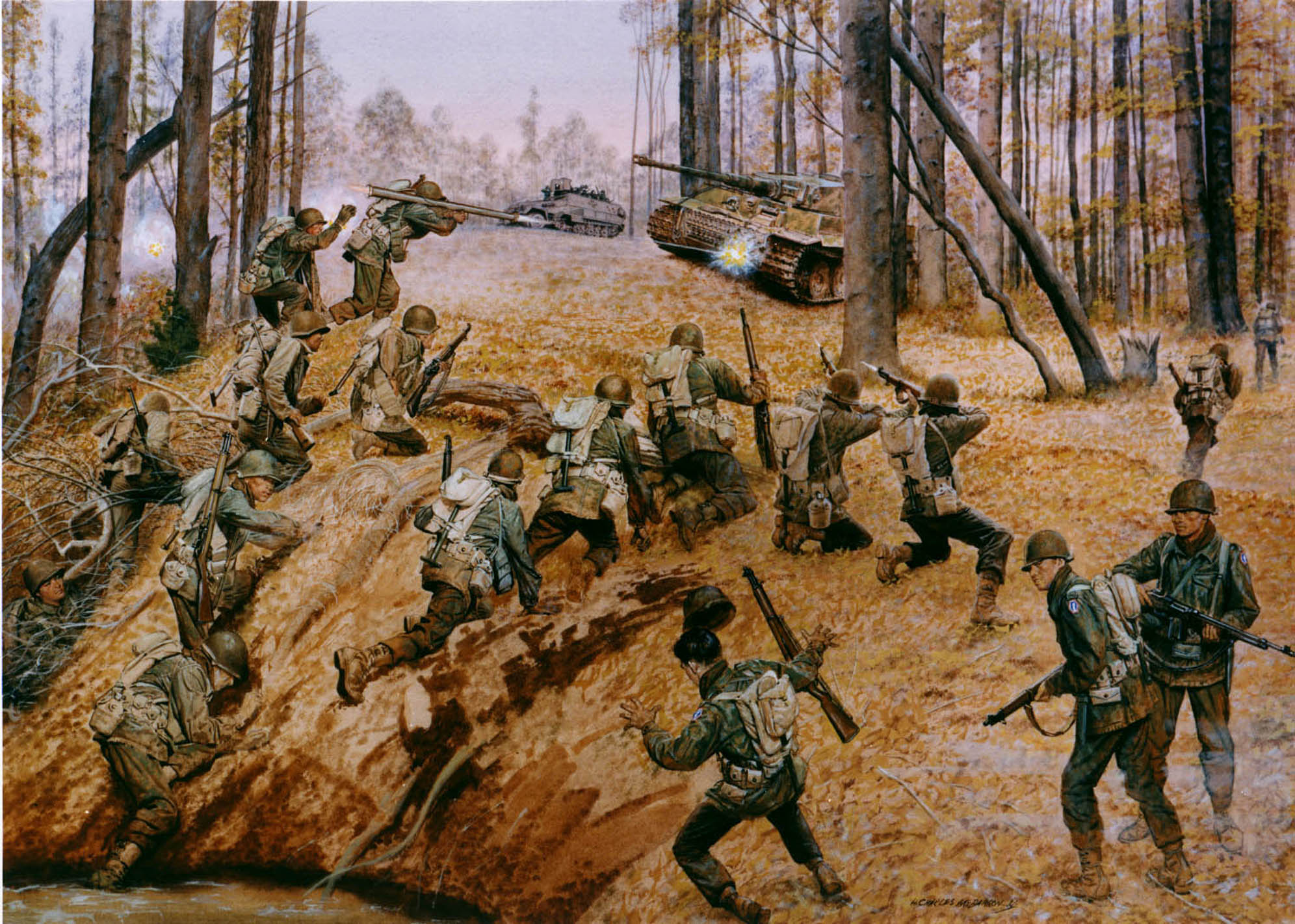
"Go For Broke" at the US Army Center of Military History

As the division commander, General Dahlquist's utilization of the 442nd received mixed reviews, chiefly from the unit's officers who believed that Dahlquist considered their Nisei soldiers to be expendable cannon fodder. While his leadership facilitated many examples of ostensibly courageous behavior, it seemed like a hunt for victories without properly tallying the costs. A particular example was when his aide Lieutenant Wells Lewis, the eldest son of novelist Sinclair Lewis, was killed while Dahlquist was issuing orders standing in the open during a battle. When Dahlquist ordered the 442nd to take Biffontaine, it was despite the sparsely populated farming town being militarily insignificant, out of the range of artillery and radio contact. In another example, Lieutenant Allan M. Ohata was ordered to charge with his men up a hill toward the enemy, who were dug in and well supplied. Ohata considered the order a certain suicide mission. Despite the threat of court-martial and demotion he refused, insisting that the men would be better off attacking the position "their own way." Lt. Ohata's Distinguished Service Cross, for his actions in Italy as a staff sergeant, was ultimately upgraded to the Medal of Honor.

On 12 November, General Dahlquist ordered the entire 442nd to stand in formation for a recognition and award ceremony. Of the 400 men originally assigned, only eighteen surviving members of K Company and eight of I Company turned out. Upon reviewing the meager assemblage Dahlquist became irritated, ignorant of the sacrifices that the unit had made in serving his orders. He demanded of Colonel Virgil R. Miller, "I want all your men to stand for this formation." Miller responded simply, "That's all of K company left, sir."

Sometime later, while the former commander of the 1st Battalion, Lieutenant Colonel Gordon Singles was filling the role of brigadier general at Fort Bragg (North Carolina), General Dahlquist arrived as part of a review. When he recognized Colonel Singles, he approached him and offered the colonel his hand saying, "Let bygones be bygones. It's all water under the bridge, isn't it?" In the presence of the entire III Corps, Colonel Singles continued to salute General Dahlquist but refused to take Dahlquist's hand.

During and after the war, the 442nd was repeatedly commemorated for their efforts in the Vosges Mountains. A commissioned painting now hangs in The Pentagon depicting their fight to reach the "Lost Battalion." A memorial was erected in Biffontaine by Gerard Henry, later the town's mayor. A monument was established in Bruyeres to mark the liberation of that city. At first a narrow road led to the monument, but the road was later widened to accommodate four tour buses and is now named "The Avenue of the 442nd Infantry Regiment" in honor of those brave soldiers.

== Champagne Campaign ==
Following the tough battle through the Vosges Mountains, the 442nd was sent to the Maritime Alps and the French Riviera. It was an easy assignment compared to what they had experienced in October. Little to no action occurred in the next four months as they rested. The 442nd guarded and patrolled a twelve to fourteen-mile front line segment of the French-Italian border. This part of their journey gained the name "Champagne Campaign" because of the available wine, women, and merry times. The 442nd experienced additional losses as patrols sometimes ran into enemy patrols, or soldiers stepped on enemy and Allied land mines. Occasionally, soldiers of the 442nd captured spies and saboteurs.

The 442nd also captured an enemy submarine. A Nisei soldier noticed what initially looked like an animal in the water, but was actually a one-man German midget submarine. The German and the submarine were captured and handed over to the U.S. Navy. On 23 March 1945, the 442nd Regimental Combat Team sailed back to Italy and returned to the Gothic Line.

== 522nd Field Artillery Battalion ==
From 20 to 22 March, the 442nd and the 232nd shipped off to Italy from France but the 522nd Field Artillery Battalion was sent to another part of Europe. They traveled northwards some 600 miles (970 km) through the Rhone Valley and stopped at Kleinblittersdorf on the east bank of the Saar River. The 522nd aided the 63rd Division on the Siegfried Line defenses south of St. Ingbert from 12 to 21 March. The 522nd became a roving battalion, supporting nearly two dozen army units along the front traveling a total of 1,100 miles (1,800 km) across Germany and accomplishing every objective of their fifty-two assignments. The 522nd was the only Nisei unit to fight in Germany. On 29 April scouts of the 522nd located a subcamp of the infamous Dachau concentration camp, adjacent to Hurlach. Scouts from the 522nd were among the first Allied troops to release prisoners from the Kaufering IV Hurlach satellite camp, one of nearly 170 such camps, where more than 3,000 prisoners were held.

As we came around the way, there were a lot of Jewish inmates coming out of the camp, and I heard that the gate was opened by our advanced scouts. They took a rifle and shot it. I think it was a fellow from Hawaii that did that. I think it was a Captain Taylor, Company B was one of them, but another person from Hawaii, he passed away. They opened the gate and all these German, I mean, Jewish victims were coming out of the camp.

Then, when we finally opened the Dachau camp, got in, oh those people were so afraid of us, I guess. You could see the fear in their face. But eventually, they realized that we were there to liberate them and help them.

They were all just skin and bones, sunken eyes. I think they were more dead than they were alive because they hadn't eaten so much because, I think, just before we got there the S.S. people had all pulled back up and they were gone. But, we went there, and outside of the camps there were a lot of railroad cars there that had bodies in them. I had the opportunity to go into the camp there, but you could smell the stench. The people were dead and piled up in the buildings, and it was just unbelievable that the Germans could do that to the Jewish people. I really didn't think it was possible at all actually.

The only thing the Nisei could really do was give them clothing and keep them warm. Nisei soldiers began to give the Jewish inmates food from their rations but were ordered to stop because the food could overwhelm the digestive systems of the starved inmates and kill them. As they continued past the subcamp, by 2 May they discovered the eastward path along which Jewish inmates were approaching Waakirchen, as the concentration camp survivors had been driven on a death march to another camp from Dachau starting there on 24 April, headed south through Eurasburg, then eastwards for a total distance of nearly sixty kilometers (37 miles), originally numbering some 15,000 prisoners.

No, my first encounter was these lumps in snow, and then I didn't know what they were, and so I went and investigated them and discovered that they were people, you know. Most of them were skeletons or people who had been beaten to death or just died of starvation or overworked or whatever. Most of them I think died from exposure because it was cold.

They discovered more subcamps and former inmates wandering the countryside. Following the German surrender, from May to November, the 522nd was assigned to security around Donauwörth, which consisted of setting up roadblocks and sentry posts to apprehend Nazis who were trying to disappear. The 522nd returned to the United States in November 1945. A memorial to the rescue by the 522nd on 2 May 1945, exists at 47°46′6.15″N 11°38′55.30″E, just under two kilometers west of the Waakirchen town center.

== Gothic Line ==
On 23 March 1945 the 100/442 shipped out from Marseille and traveled to Leghorn, Italy, attached to the 92nd Division. The Fifth Army had been stalemated at the Gothic Line for the prior five months. The 442nd faced extremely tough terrain, where the saw-toothed Apennines rose up from the Ligurian Sea. Starting from the northeast, the peaks hugged the east coast of Italy and stretched diagonally southward across the Italian boot. To the west, on the other side of the mountains, was the wide flat Po River Valley that led to the Austrian Alps—the last barrier to Germany. For nine months German Field Marshal Albert Kesselring directed the construction of the Gothic Line along the top of the Apennines. The Todt Organization (known for its fortifications at Monte Cassino) used 15,000 Italian slave laborers. They drilled into solid rock to make gun pits and trenches, which they reinforced with concrete. They built 2,376 machine gun nests with interlocking fire.

On the Italian Front, the 442nd had contact with the only segregated African-American active combat unit of the U.S. Army in Europe, the 92nd Infantry Division, as well as troops of the British and French colonial empires (West and East Africans, Moroccans, Algerians, Indians, Gurkhas, Jews from the Palestine mandate) and the non-segregated Brazilian Expeditionary Force which had in its ranks ethnic Japanese.

General Mark W. Clark welcomed the 442 and presented his plan to break the Gothic Line. General Clark had a disagreement with Supreme Commander Eisenhower. Clark had to negotiate for the return of the 100th and 442nd because Eisenhower wanted them for the Battle of the Bulge and General Devers, commander of the Sixth Army Group, needed fresh troops. General Clark got his wish. The 442nd and 100th, minus the 522nd, along with the 92nd Division, mounted a surprise diversionary attack on the left flank. They intended to shift enemy attention to it from the interior, allowing the Eighth Army to cross the Senio River on the right flank and then the Fifth Army on the left.

In front of the 442nd lay mountains code-named Georgia, Florida, Ohio 1, Ohio 2, Ohio 3, Monte Cerreta, Monte Folgorito, Monte Belvedere, Monte Carchio, and Monte Altissimo. These objectives hinged on surprising the Germans. The 100th went after Georgia Hill and the 3rd Battalion attacked Mount Folgorita. On 3 April the 442nd moved into position under the cover of nightfall to hide from the Germans who had good sight lines from their location on the mountains. The next day the 442nd waited. At 0500 the following morning they were ready to strike. A little over 30 minutes later objectives Georgia and Mount Folgorita were taken, cracking the Gothic Line. They achieved surprise and forced the enemy to retreat. After counterattacking, the Germans were defeated. During this time, 2nd Battalion was moving into position at Mount Belvedere, which overlooked Massa and the Frigido River.

The 442nd made a continuous push against the German Army and objectives began to fall: Ohio 1, 2, and 3, Mount Belvedere on 6 April by 2nd Battalion, Montignoso 8 April by 3rd Battalion, Mount Brugiana on 11 April by 2nd Battalion, Carrara by 3rd Battalion on 11 April, and Ortonovo by the 100th on 15 April. The 442 turned a surprise diversionary attack into an all-out offensive. The advance came so quickly that supply units had a hard time keeping up.

The Nisei drove so hard that beginning on 17 April the Germans decided to destroy their fortifications and pull back to make a final stand at Aulla. The last German defense in Italy was Monte Nebbione, directly south of Aulla. San Terenzo lay East of Mount Nobbione and became the launching point for the Aulla assault. The final drive of the 442nd began on 19 April and lasted until 23 April, when the 3rd Battalion finally took Mount Nebbione and Mount Carbolo. Following the fall of San Terenzo, 2nd Battalion hooked right around the mountains and Task Force Fukuda (consisting of Companies B and F from 2nd Battalion) flanked left from Mount Carbolo creating a pincer move onto Aulla. On 25 April Aulla fell and the German retreat was cut off. In the days that followed, Germans began to surrender in the hundreds and thousands to the Fifth and Eighth Armies. This was 442nd's final World War II action. On 2 May the war ended in Italy followed six days later by Victory in Europe.

== Service decorations and legacy ==
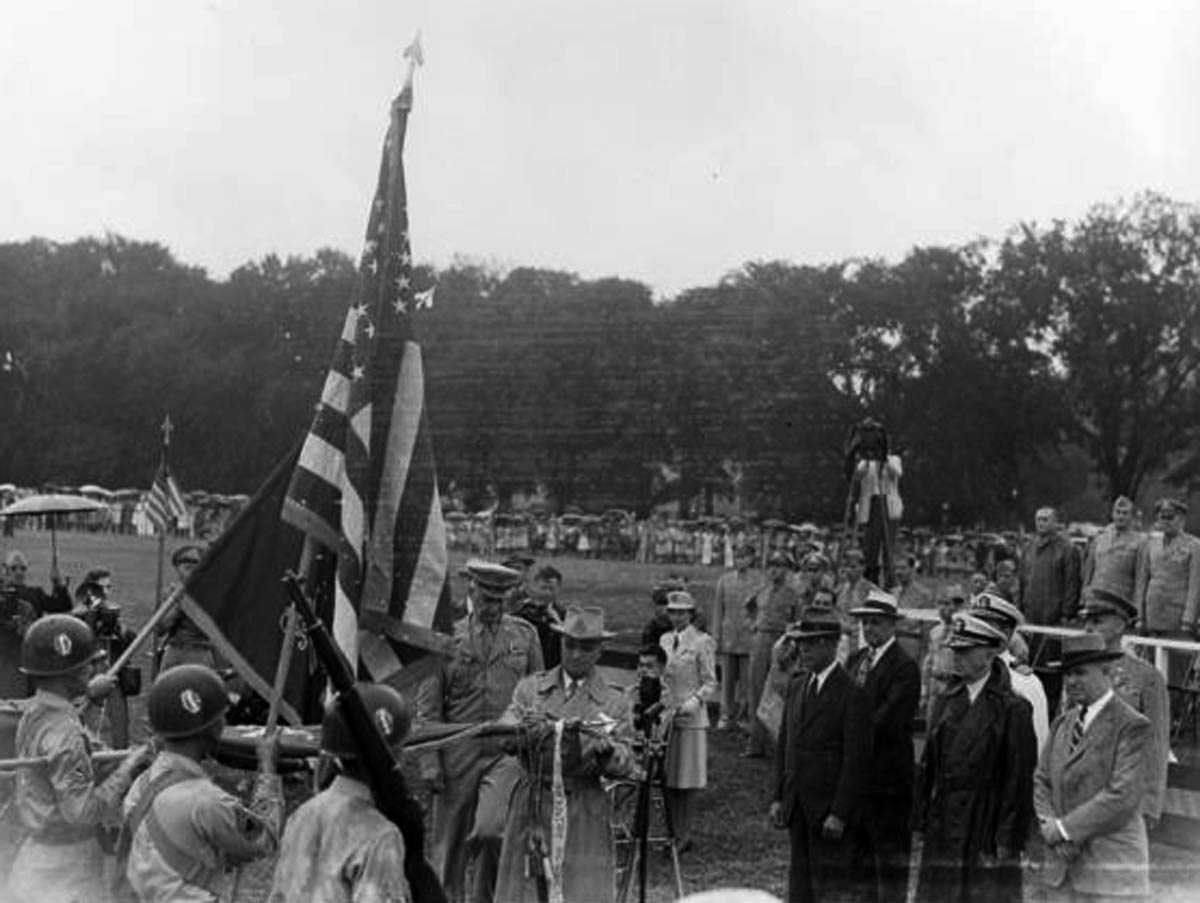
The 442nd received the 7th Presidential Unit Citation for outstanding accomplishments in combat in the vicinity of Seravezza, Carrara, and Fosdinovo, Italy, from 5–14 April 1945.

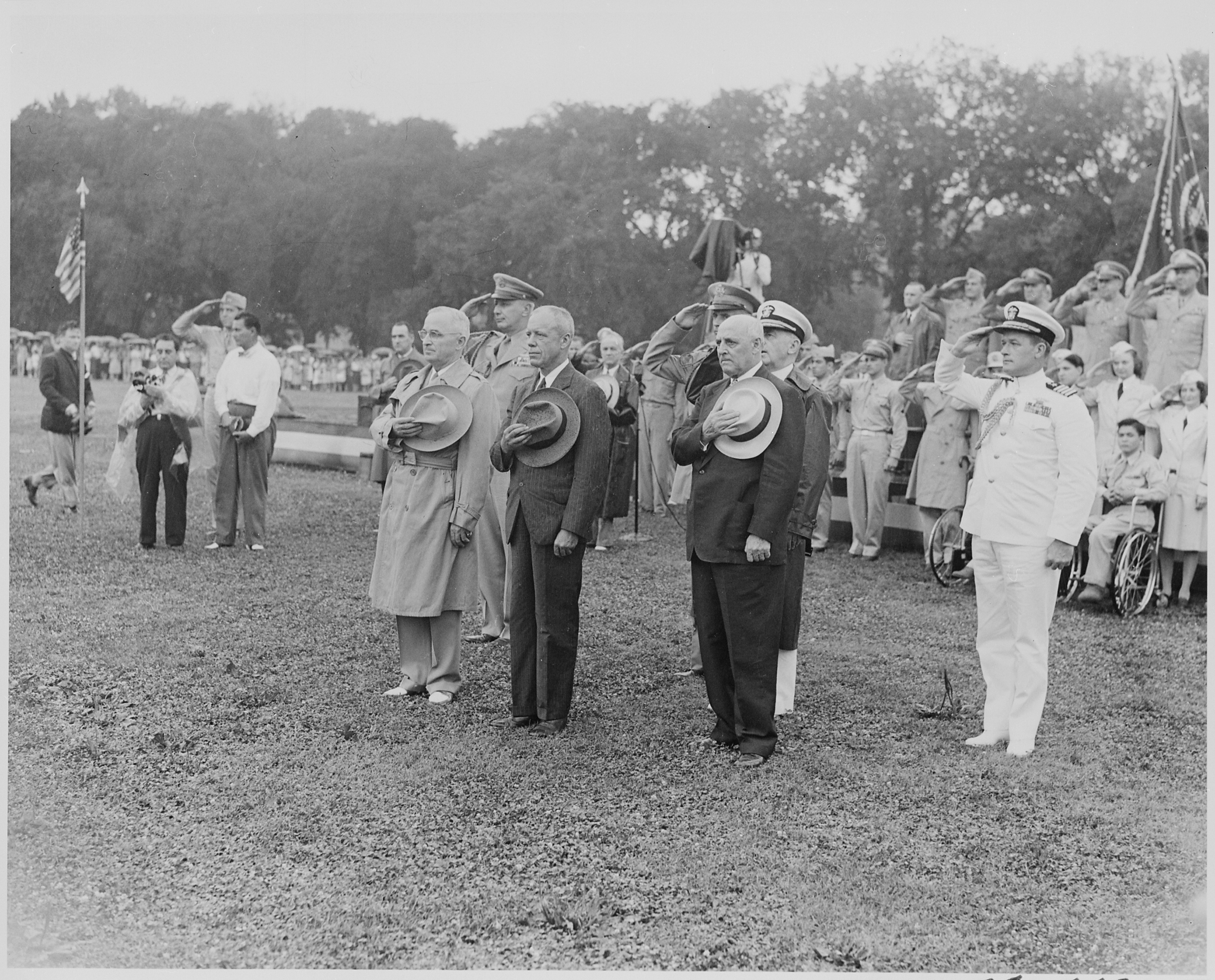
President Truman and other dignitaries saluting the 442nd Regimental Combat Team

The 100th/442nd Regimental Combat Team is the most decorated unit for its size and length of service in the history of American warfare. The 4,000 men who initially came in April 1943 had to be replaced nearly 2.5 times. In total, about 10,000 men served. The unit was awarded eight Presidential Unit Citations (5 earned in one month). Twenty-one of its members were awarded Medals of Honor. Members of the 442nd received 18,143 awards in less than two years, including:

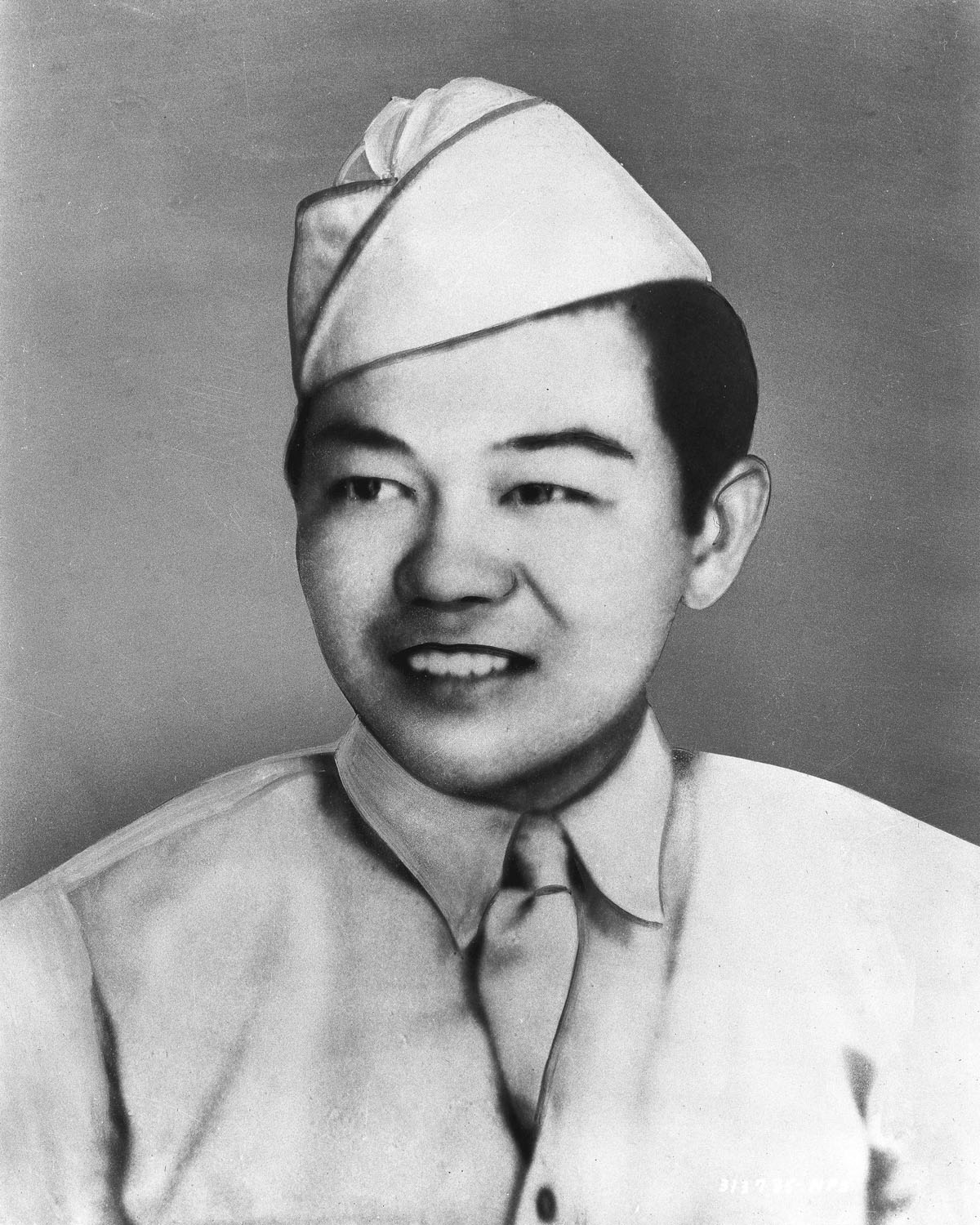
Sadao Munemori was the only Japanese American awarded the Medal of Honor around the time of World War II.

- 21 Medals of Honor (The first awarded posthumously to Private First Class Sadao Munemori, Company A, 100th Battalion, for action near Seravezza, Italy, on 5 April 1945; 19 upgraded from other awards in June 2000). Recipients include:
  - Barney F. Hajiro
  - Mikio Hasemoto
  - Joe Hayashi
  - Shizuya Hayashi
  - Daniel K. Inouye
  - Yeiki Kobashigawa
  - Robert T. Kuroda
  - Kaoru Moto
  - Sadao Munemori
  - Kiyoshi K. Muranaga
  - Masato Nakae
  - Shinyei Nakamine
  - William K. Nakamura
  - Joe M. Nishimoto
  - Allan M. Ohata
  - James K. Okubo
  - Yukio Okutsu
  - Frank H. Ono
  - Kazuo Otani
  - George T. Sakato
  - Ted T. Tanouye
- 29 Distinguished Service Cross (Excluding 19 Distinguished Service Crosses which were upgraded to Medals of Honor in June 2000).
  - Irving M. Akahoshi
  - Henry Y. Arao
  - Masao Awakuni
  - Yoshimi R. Fujiwara
  - Jesse M. Hirata
  - George S. Iida
  - Young-Oak Kim
  - Kiichi Koda
  - Ronald H. Kuroda
  - Harry F. Madokoro
  - Kazuo Masuda
  - Shinyei R. Matayoshi
  - Fujio J. Miyamoto
  - Takeichi Miyashiro
  - Robert K. Nakasaki
  - Thomas Y. Ono
  - Masanao R. Otake
  - Itsumu Sasaoka
  - Togo Sugiyama
  - Masaru Suehiro
  - Shigeo J. Takata
  - Tsuneo Takemoto
  - Larry T. Tanimoto
  - Jim Y. Tazoi
  - Thomas I. Yamanaga
  - Gordon K. Yamashiro
  - Robert H. Yasutake
  - Matsuichi Yogi
  - Yukio Yokota
- 1 Distinguished Service Medal
- 371 Silver Stars
- 22 Legion of Merit Medals
- 15 Soldier's Medals
- 4,000 Bronze Stars (plus 1,200 Oak Leaf Clusters for a second award; one Bronze Star was upgraded to a Medal of Honor in June 2000. One Bronze Star was upgraded to a Silver Star in September 2009.)
- More than 4,000 Purple Hearts

Some of the first memorials to the unit were created by 442nd and MIS veterans themselves, in the creation of the many Nisei American Legion, VFW, and independent memorial posts around the country, such as Nisei VFW Post 8985 in Sacramento, CA, founded in 1947.

In 1962 Governor John Connally of Texas made the members of the 442nd RCT honorary Texans in appreciation of their rescue of the Lost Battalion of the Texas National Guard in the Vosges in 1944.

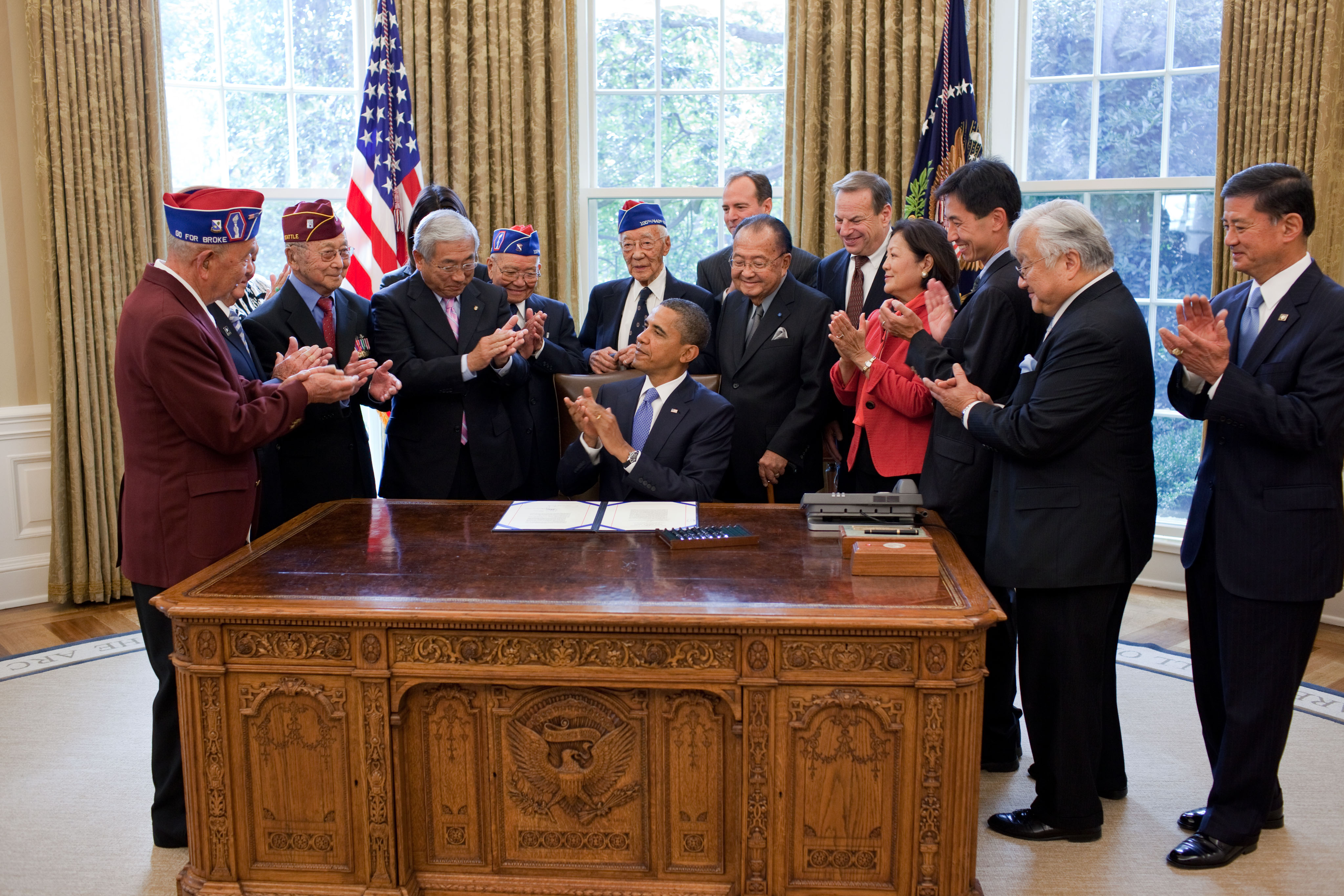
President Obama signs S.1055, granting Nisei veterans the Congressional Gold Medal.

On 5 October 2010, Congress approved the granting of the Congressional Gold Medal to the 442nd Regimental Combat Team, the 100th Infantry Battalion, and Nisei serving in the Military Intelligence Service. The Nisei Soldiers of World War II Congressional Gold Medal was collectively presented on 2 November 2011.

In 2012, the surviving members of the 442nd RCT were made chevaliers of the French Légion d'Honneur for their actions contributing to the liberation of France during World War II and their heroic rescue of the Lost Battalion outside of Biffontaine.

5 April is celebrated as National "Go For Broke Day", in honor of the 442nd's first Medal of Honor recipient, Pfc. Sadao Munemori, killed in action near Seravezza, Italy on 5 April 1945.

The Japanese American Memorial to Patriotism During World War II in Washington, D.C. is a National Park Service site honoring Japanese American veterans who served in the Military Intelligence Service, 100th Infantry Battalion, 442nd RCT, and other units, as well as the patriotism and endurance of those held in Japanese American concentration camps and detention centers.

The Go For Broke Monument in Little Tokyo, Los Angeles, commemorates the Japanese Americans who served in the United States Army during World War II.

Dedicated in 1998, the "Brothers In Valor" memorial at Fort DeRussy in Honolulu, HI, honors the Japanese American veterans who served in World War 2 with the 100BN/442RCT, 1399BN, and MIS.

California has given four state highway segments honorary designations for Japanese American soldiers:

- State Route 23 between U.S. Route 101 and State Route 118 is named the Military Intelligence Memorial Freeway;
- State Route 99 between Fresno and Madera is named the 100th Infantry Battalion Memorial Highway;
- State Route 99 between Salida and Manteca is named the 442nd Regimental Combat Team Memorial Highway;
- The interchange between the I-105 and I-405 freeways in Los Angeles is labeled the Sadao S. Munemori Memorial Interchange.

The USS Hornet Museum in Alameda, California, has a permanent special exhibit honoring the 442nd Infantry Regiment.

On November 17, 2020, the United States Postal Service (USPS) announced they would release in 2021 a postage stamp honoring the contributions of Japanese American soldiers, 33,000 altogether, who served in the U.S. Army during World War II, following a multi-year nationwide campaign. The "stamp our story" campaign started in 2006.

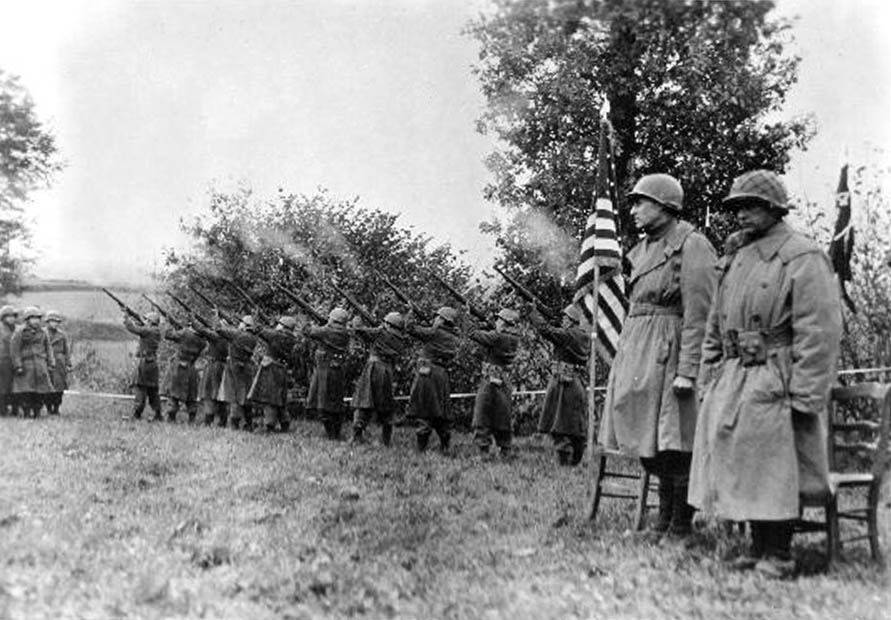
Members of the 442nd RCT fire a salute to honor their fallen comrades at a memorial ceremony.

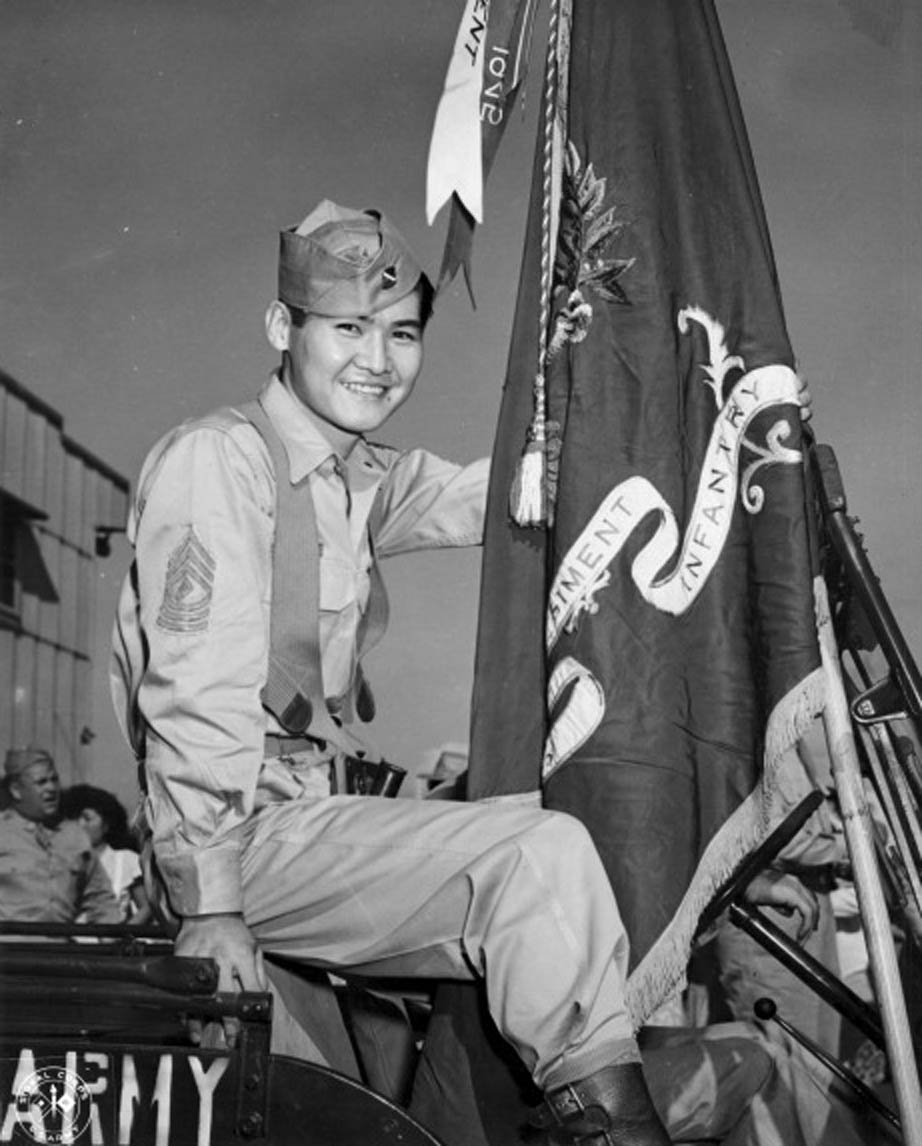
First Sergeant Thomas S. Harimoto displaying the 442nd's colors carrying the unit's Presidential Unit Citation

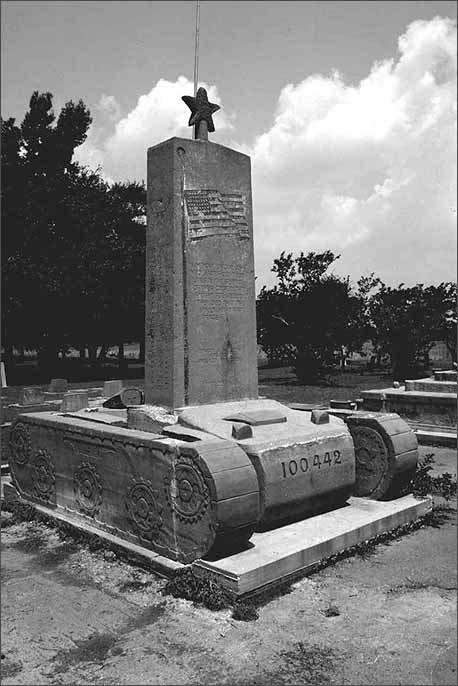
Monument to the 100th Battalion, 442nd Regimental Combat Team, Rohwer Memorial Cemetery

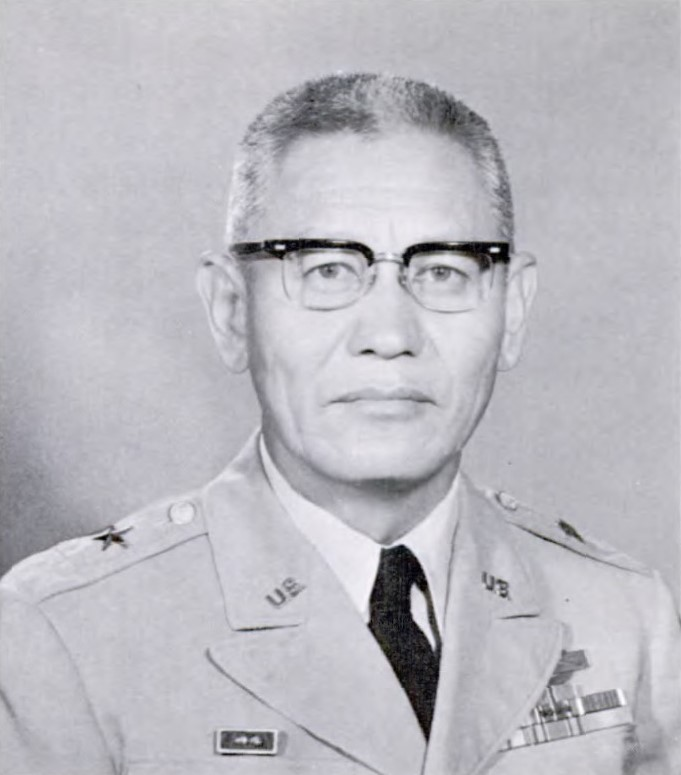
Brig. Gen. Francis Shigeo Takemoto, first Japanese-American general officer (1964) and veteran of both the 100th Infantry Battalion and the 442nd RCT

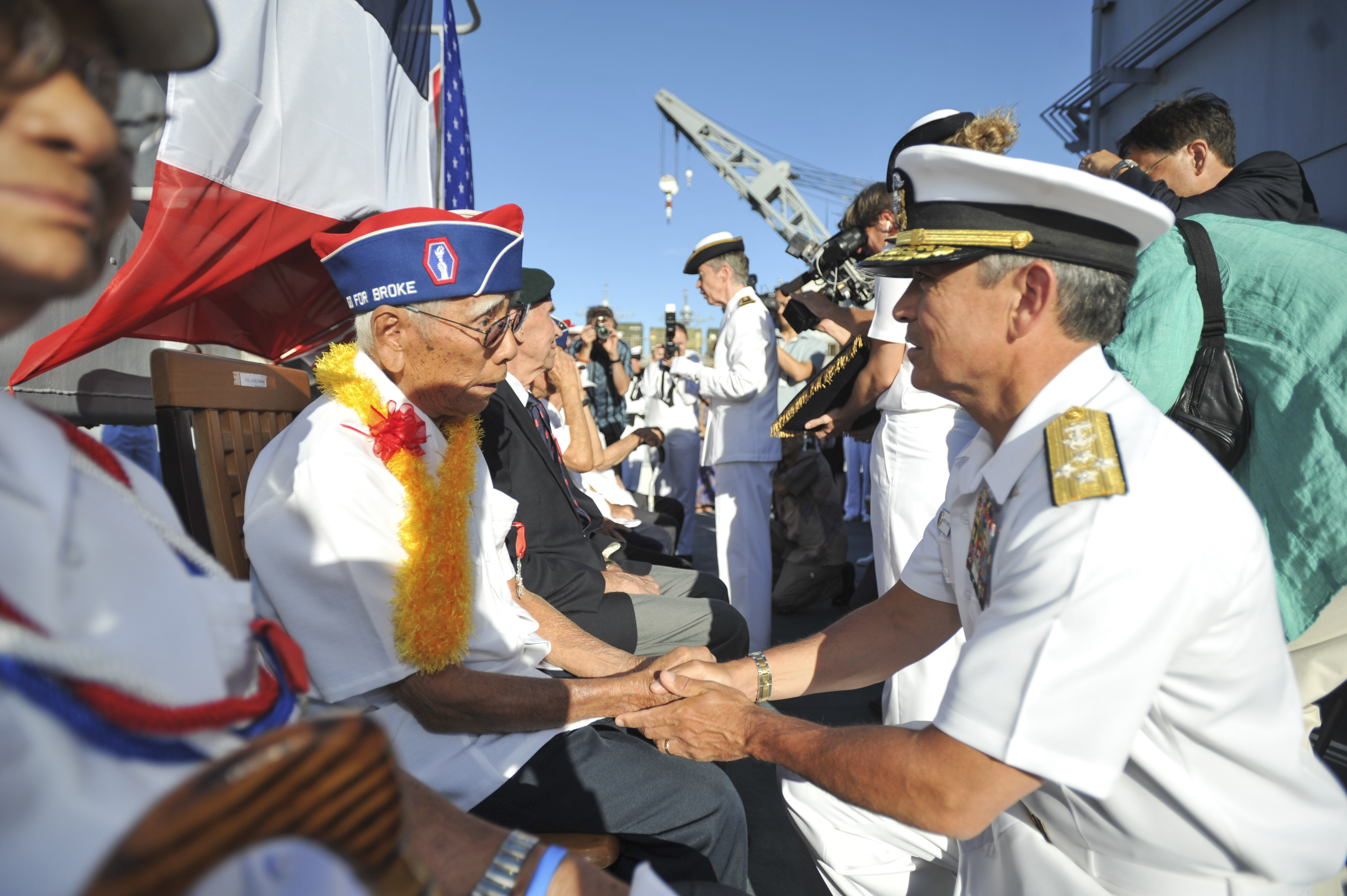
Pearl Harbor (2 July 2014). Adm. Harry Harris Jr., COMPACFLT, thanks Ralph Tomei, a 442nd veteran. Tomei represented his friend Shiro Aoki as French RADM Anne Cullere presents him with the Legion of Honor.

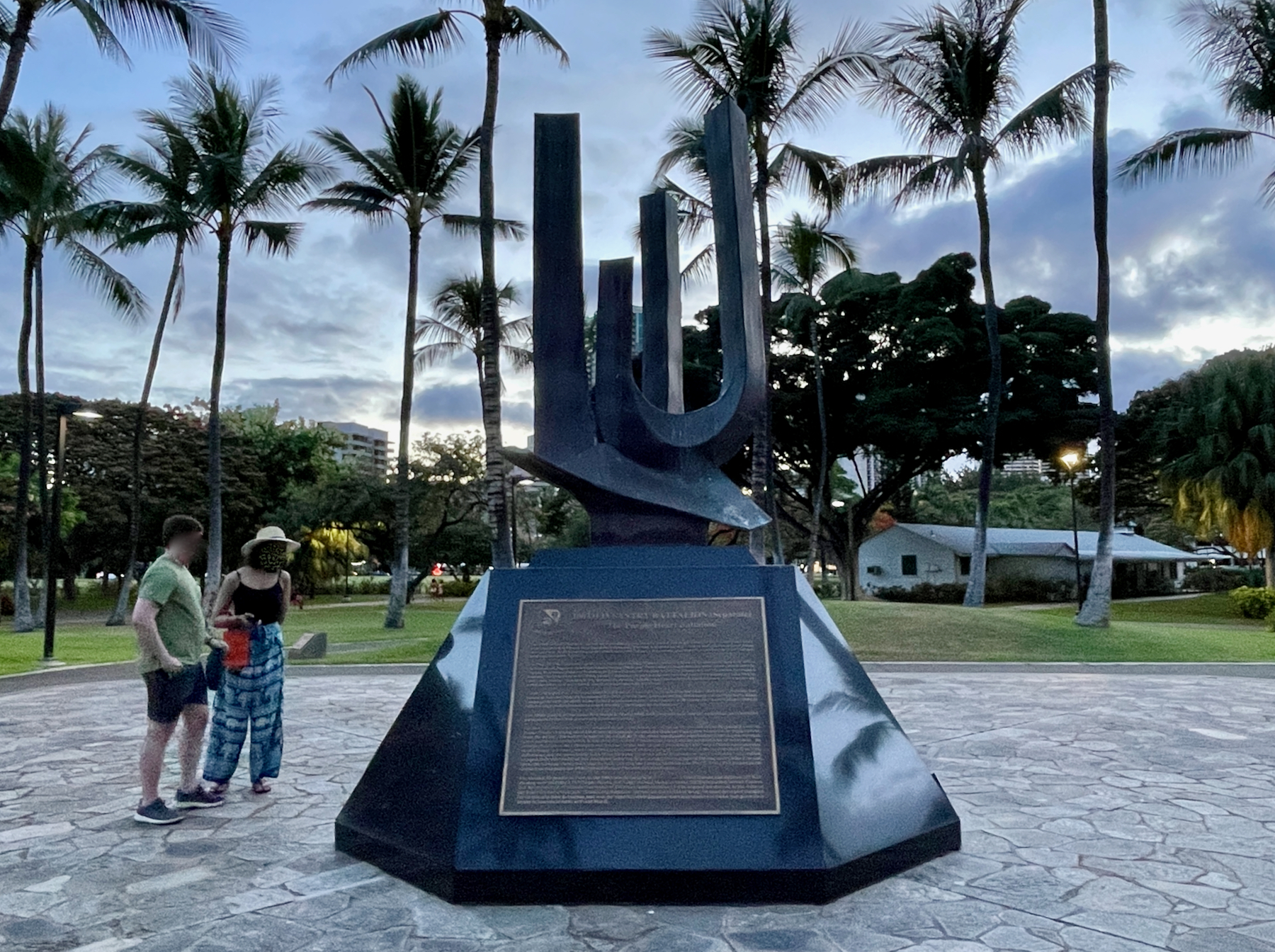
The 'Brothers In Valor' memorial at Ft DeRussy recognizes the sacrifices of the 100BN, 442RCT, 1399BN, and MIS.

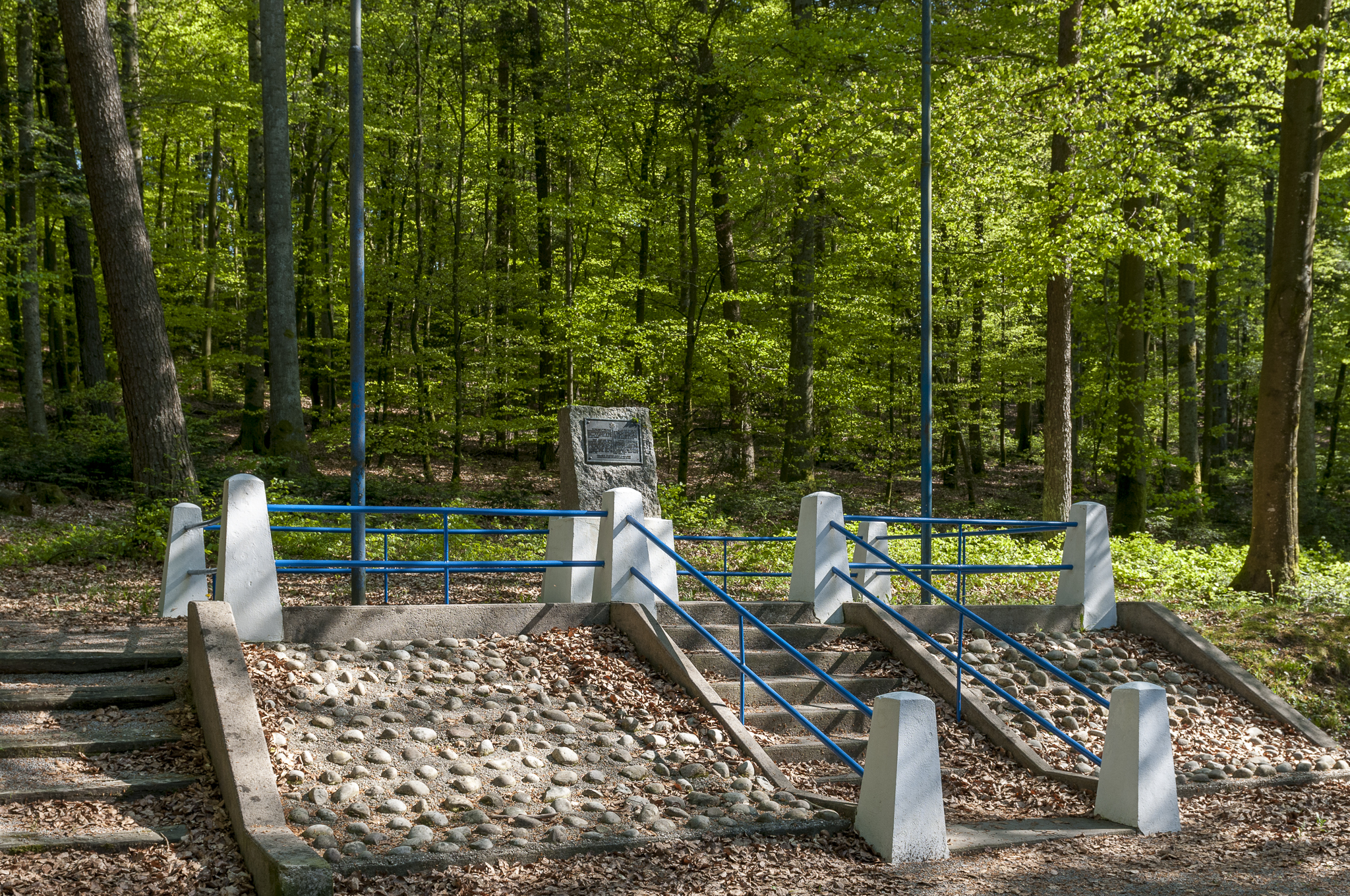
The American monument in Bruyères honoring the Japanese Americans serving in the 442nd

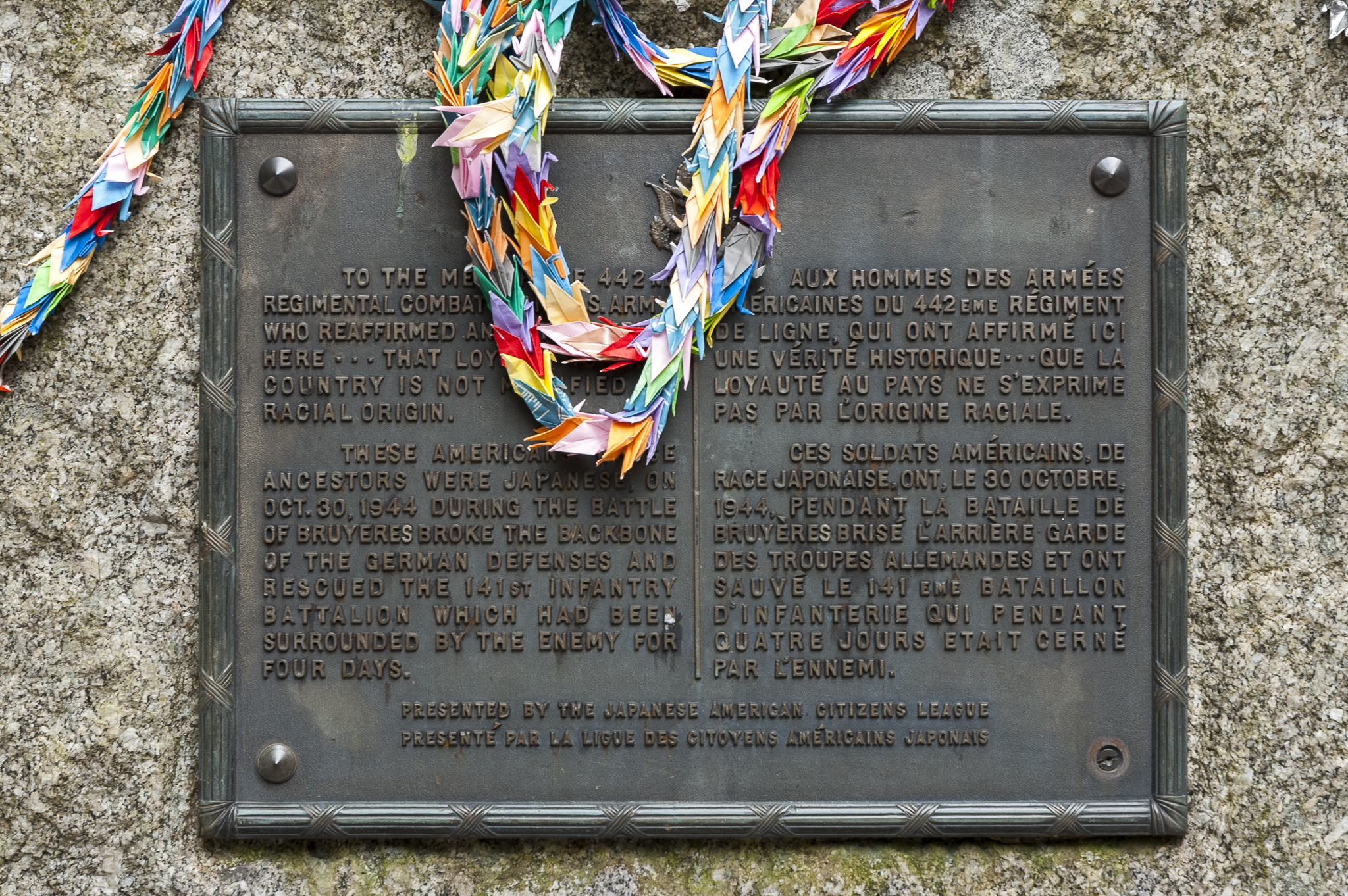
The Congressional Gold Medal awarded to the 100th Infantry Battalion, the 442nd RCT, as well as the Military Intelligence Service

== Original fight song ==
Original fight song of the 442nd RCT Hawai'i Go For Broke Lyrics by Martin Kida -KIA, Score by T.Y.—

REMEMBER PEARL HARBOR

History in every century
We recall an act that lives forevermore
We recall as into night they fall
The things that happened on Hawaii shore

Let's remember Pearl Harbor
As we go to meet the foe
Let's remember Pearl Harbor
As we did the Alamo
We will always remember
How they died for liberty
Let's remember Pearl Harbor
And go on to victory

GO FOR BROKE

Four Forty-Second Infantry
We are the boys of Hawaii Nei
We will fight for you
And the red white and blue
And will go the front
And back to Honolulu-lu-lu
Fighting for dear old Uncle Sam
Go for broke we don't give a damn
We will round up the Huns
At the point of a gun
And victory will be ours
Go for broke! Four Four Two!
Go for broke! Four Four Two!
And victory will be ours.

All hail our company.

== After the war ==
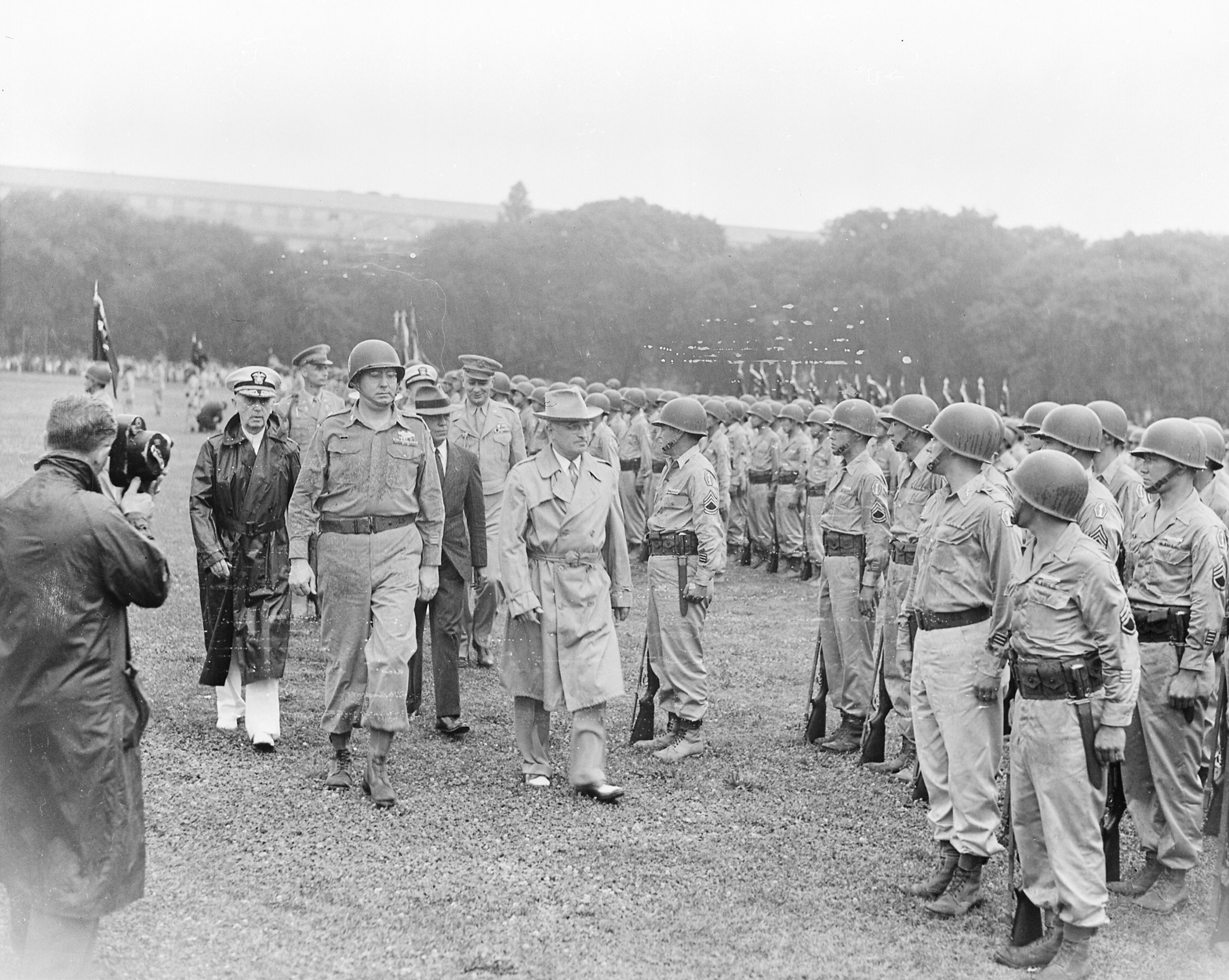
President Truman walks past members of the 442nd Regimental Combat Team as they stand at attention on the Ellipse.

The record of the Japanese Americans serving in the 442nd and in the Military Intelligence Service (U.S. Pacific Theater forces in World War II) helped change the minds of anti-Japanese American critics in the continental U.S. and resulted in easing of restrictions and the eventual release of the 120,000-strong community well before the end of World War II. In Hawaii, the veterans were welcomed home as heroes by a grateful community that had supported them through those trying times.

However, the unit's exemplary service and many decorations did not change the attitudes of the general population in the continental U.S. towards people of Japanese ancestry after World War II. Veterans came home to signs that read "No Japs Allowed" and "No Japs Wanted", the denial of service in shops and restaurants, and the vandalism of their homes and property.

On 15 July 1946, the 442nd Regiment marched down Constitution Avenue to the Ellipse south of the White House. President Truman gave a speech and honored the regiment by awarding them the Presidential Unit Citation. Initially, many Veterans' organizations such as the VFW and the American Legion refused to allow Nisei veterans into existing posts and some even removed Japanese-American soldiers from their honor rolls. It is believed that white officers from the 442nd advocated on the behalf of the Nisei in Chicago to be allowed to form their own American Legion post 1183 in 1946, while Alva Fleming, a Navy veteran in Sacramento district leadership approved the charter for Nisei VFW Post 8985 in Sacramento in 1947. Fleming would go on to become the VFW State Commander for California and was instrumental in founding a total of 14 segregated Nisei VFW posts in the state. Veterans in the Pacific Northwest were unable to find any post willing to accept them, and eventually formed their own independent "Nisei Veterans Committee".

Many Nisei veterans had difficulty finding houses in the continental United States. Their homes were occupied with new tenants. Due to the housing shortage, many Nisei veterans resorted to using federal housing programs. Many Nisei veterans used the G.I. Bill as an opportunity to attend university. Many Nisei became doctors, dentists, architects, scientists, engineers, and politicians in public office.

Anti-Japanese sentiment remained strong into the 1960s, but faded along with other once-common prejudices, even while remaining strong in certain circles. Conversely, the story of the 442nd provided a leading example of what was to become the controversial model minority stereotype.

According to author and historian Tom Coffman, men of the 100th/442nd/MIS dreaded returning home as second-class citizens. In Hawaii these men became involved in a peaceful movement. It has been described as the 100th/442nd returning from the battles in Europe to the battle at home. The non-violent revolution was successful and put veterans in public office in what became known as the Revolution of 1954.

One notable effect of the service of the Japanese-American units was to help convince Congress to end its opposition towards Hawaii's statehood petition. Hawaii had been petitioning many times over 60 years to be admitted to the U.S. as the 49th state. The exemplary record of the Japanese Americans serving in these units and the loyalty showed by the rest of Hawaii's population during World War II allowed Hawaii to be admitted as the 50th state (Alaska was granted statehood just prior).

In post-war American popular slang, the phrase "going For Broke" was adopted from the 442nd's unit motto "Go For Broke", which according to the 1951 film Go For Broke! was derived from the Hawaiian pidgin phrase used by craps shooters risking all their money on one roll of the dice.

== Demobilization and rebirth ==
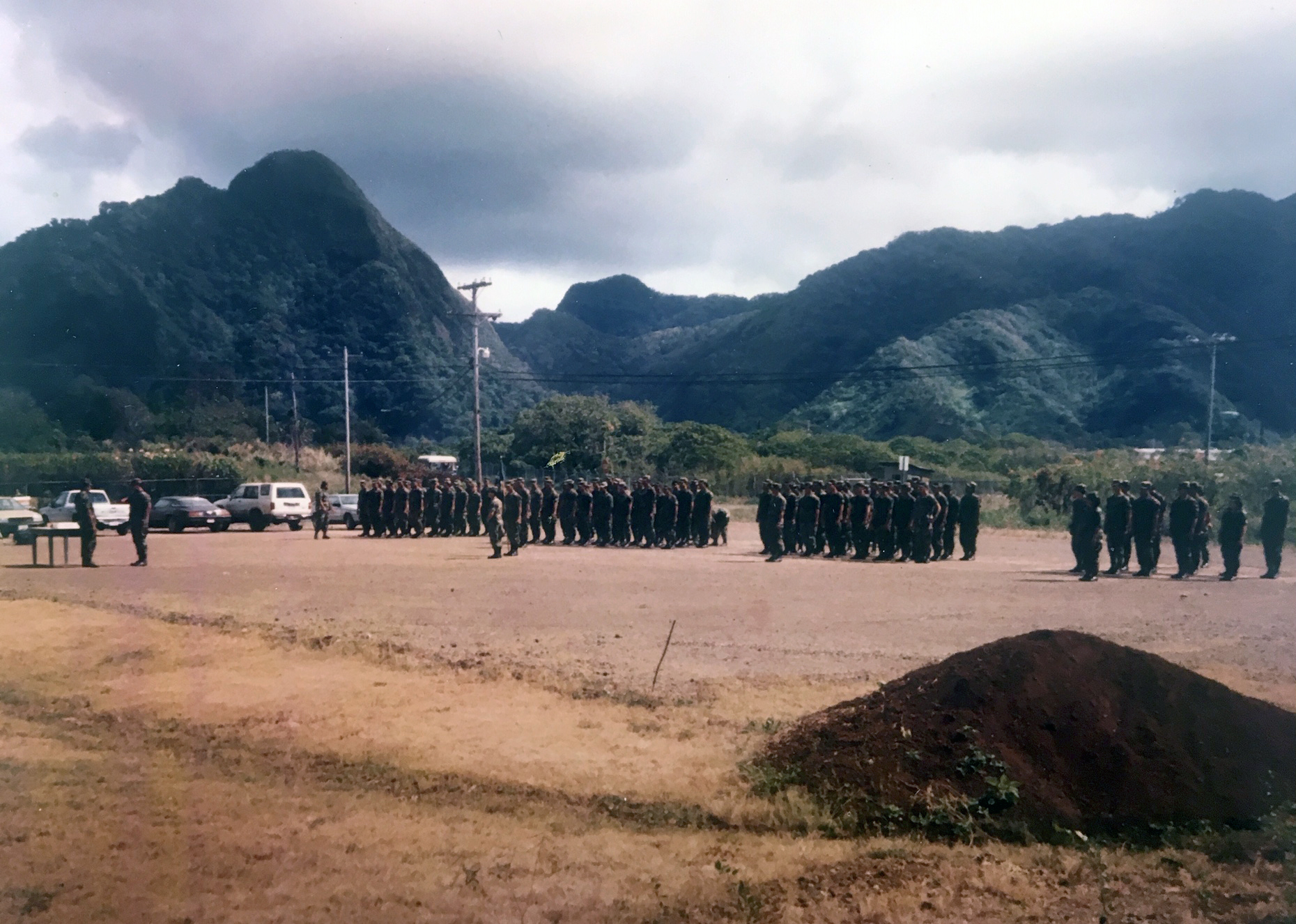
Soldiers from the 100th Infantry Battalion gather in formation during an exercise in American Samoa in 1987.

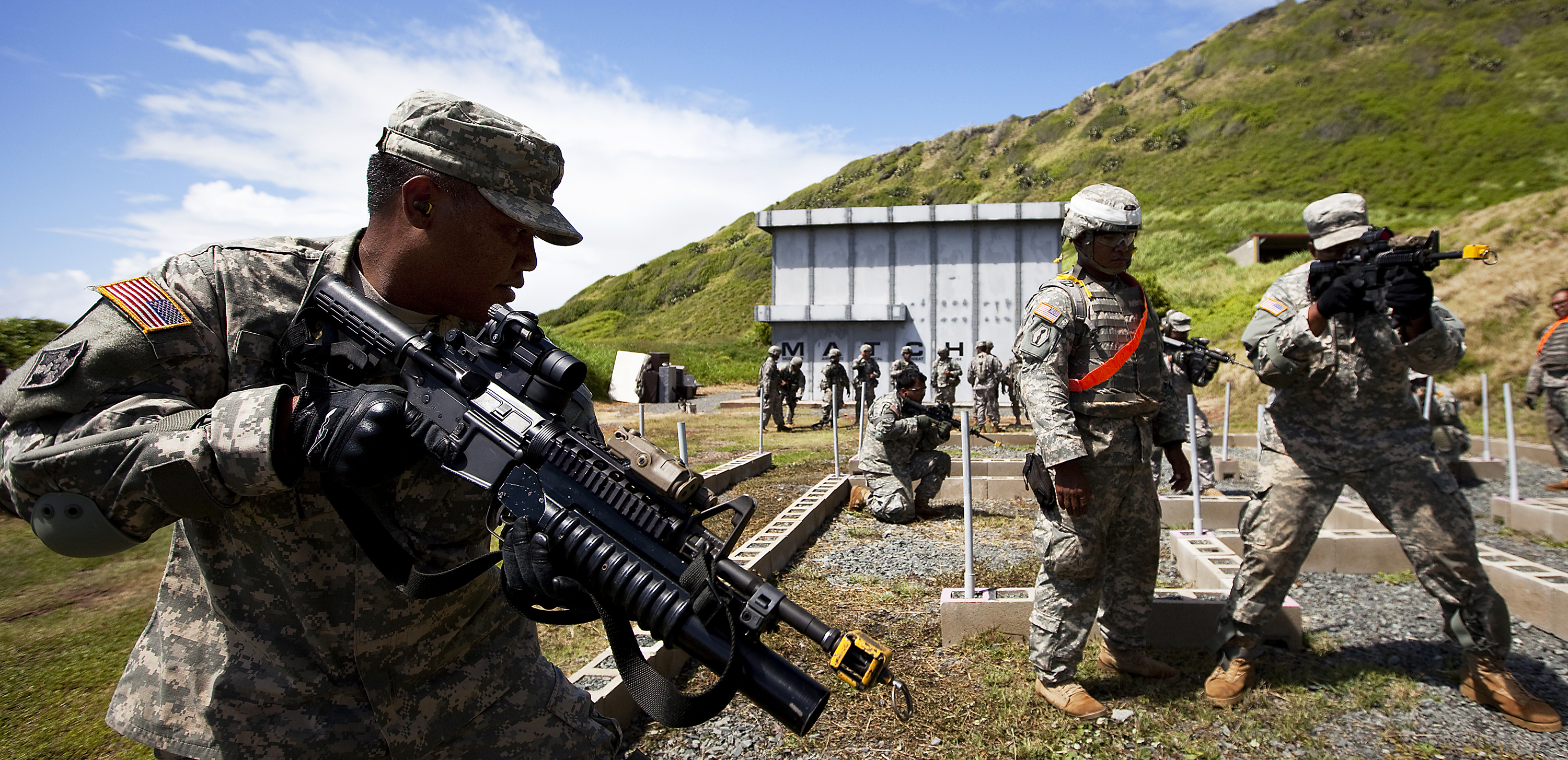
Soldiers of E Company, 100th Battalion, 442nd Infantry train at Marine Corps Base Hawaii in 2011.

The 442nd RCT was inactivated in Honolulu in 1946, but reactivated in 1947 in the U.S. Army Reserve. It was mobilized in 1968 to refill the Strategic Reserve during the Vietnam War, and carries on the honors and traditions of the unit. Today, the 100th Battalion, 442nd Infantry, is the only ground combat unit of the Army Reserve. The battalion headquarters is at Fort Shafter, Hawaii, with subordinate units based in Hilo, American Samoa, Saipan, and Guam. The only military presence in American Samoa consists of the battalion's B and C companies.

In August 2004, the battalion was mobilized for duty in Iraq. Stationed at Logistics Support Area Anaconda in the city of Balad, which is located about 50 miles northwest of Baghdad. Lt. Colonel Colbert Low assumed command of the battalion only a few weeks after the battalion arrived at Logistical Support Area Anaconda. In early 2006, the 100th had returned home. One soldier was killed by an improvised explosive device attack. Four members of the battalion were killed in action, and several dozen injured, before the battalion returned home. During the year-long deployment, one of Charlie Company's attached platoons, discovered over 50 weapons caches. Unlike the soldiers of World War II who were predominantly Japanese Americans, these soldiers came from as far away as Miami, Florida, Tennessee, Alaska and included soldiers from Hawaii, Philippines, Samoa and Palau. For their actions in Iraq the unit received the Meritorious Unit Commendation.

The unit was once again deployed in 2009. The unit was called up alongside the 3rd brigade, 25th Infantry Division; and was assigned as an element of the 29th Infantry Brigade Combat Team. Nominally deployed to Kuwait, it conducted patrols into Iraq, leading to two fatalities; those patrols consisted of more than a million miles of driving conducting convoy duty. During the units deployment, several dozen of the unit's American Samoan servicemembers became naturalized U.S. citizens while in Kuwait.

== Notable members ==
- S. Neil Fujita, graphic designer. Designed many book and album covers. Head of Columbia Records Art Dept designing jazz album covers after WWII. Among his book covers are "The Godfather" logo and typeset for the 1969 novel and later used for the film's advertising. Designed "The Today Show" sunrise logo used from the 70's to the present day.
- Takashi "Halo" Hirose, first Japanese American to represent the United States in any international swimming competition, and the first to set a swimming world record; awarded five battle stars, the Combat Infantryman Badge and a Presidential Unit Citation. Inducted into Ohio State University's Sports Hall of Fame and the International Swimming Hall of Fame.

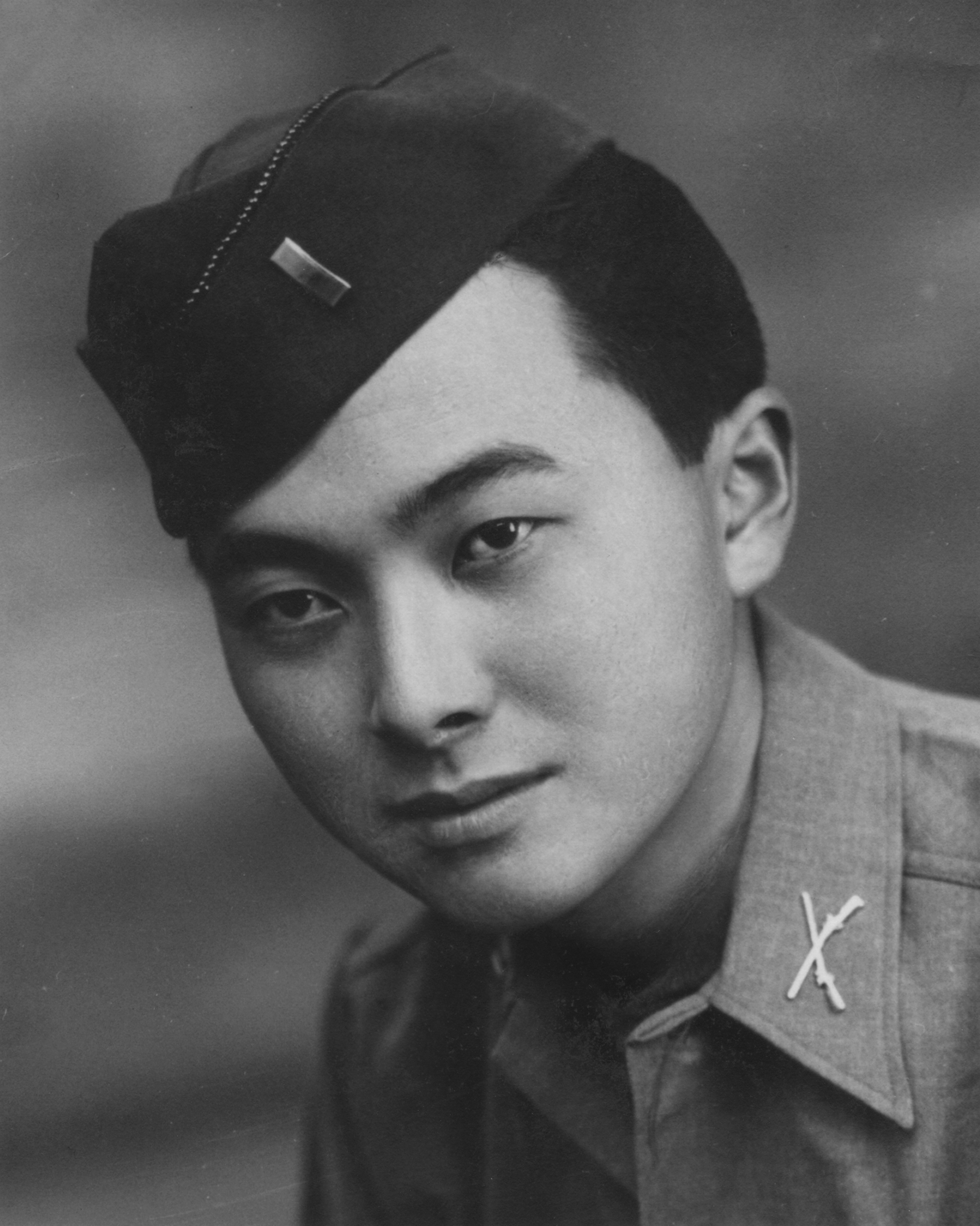
Daniel Inouye lost his right arm to a grenade wound and received several military decorations, including the Medal of Honor.

- Daniel Inouye, U.S. Representative from Hawaii (1959–62); U.S. Senator from Hawaii (1962–2012); President pro tempore of the Senate (2010–12); awarded the Medal of Honor and Purple Heart. Inouye had wanted to become a surgeon before he lost his right arm in the combat action for which he was later awarded the Medal of Honor.
- Dale Ishimoto, actor in many films, TV shows, and commercials
- Susumu Ito, emeritus Professor of Cell Biology and Anatomy, Harvard Medical School (1960–90)
- Shiro Kashino, recipient of the Silver Star who fought to have his rank restored after being illegitimately demoted
- Isao Kikuchi, graphic designer, illustrator, carver, and painter. Illustrated Welcome Home Swallows and Blue Jay in the Desert.
- Colonel Young-Oak Kim, the only Korean American officer during his service in 442nd Infantry. First officer from an ethnic minority to command a U.S. Army combat battalion.
- Spark Matsunaga, U.S. Representative from Hawaii (1962–76); U.S. Senator from Hawaii (1977–90)
- Sadao Munemori, the only Japanese American to be awarded the Medal of Honor during or immediately after World War II
- Wataru Nakamura, posthumously awarded the Medal of Honor for actions during the Korean War
- Lane Nakano, actor, featured in the 1951 film Go For Broke!, father of writer and director Desmond Nakano
- Shinkichi Tajiri, sculptor, member of the COBRA art movement, 1955 Golden Palm Winner at Cannes, Purple Heart Recipient
- James Takemori, judoka and recipient of the Order of the Rising Sun

== See also ==
- Hawaii Admission Act
- Japanese American service in World War II
- List of films about the Japanese American internment
- List of internment camps
- Military history of Asian Americans § World War II
- Military Intelligence Service (United States)
- Anti-DEI deletions by the U.S. Department of Defense
