= Isao Kikuchi =

American artist

Isao Kikuchi (Japanese: 菊地 功男, 9 December 1921 – 31 August 2017) was an American graphic designer, painter, carver and illustrator.

== Biography ==
Isao Kikuchi was born in East Los Angeles on 9 December 1921, the second child of Yoriyuki Kikuchi – one of the first Asian Americans to graduate from the University of Southern California School of Dentistry - and Miya Sonomiya Kikuchi. In 1942, at the onset of World War II, Isao was lured to the high desert of California by an offer of construction work at union wages. He found himself interned at the Manzanar relocation camp which would become home to his family and 10,000 other Japanese Americans evacuated from the West Coast under authority of Presidential Executive Order 9066. Isao recounted his time at Manzanar in an interview conducted by Richard Potashin as part of the Densho Digital Archive - Manzanar National Historical Site Collection. The interview is available on the Densho site under a Creative Commons license. A video recording of the interview (Kirk Peterson, videographer) is also available.

After 12 months, Isao was allowed to leave Manzanar for Chicago where he was drafted into the army. As a member of the now famed 442nd Regimental Combat Team, Isao served with distinction and saw fierce fighting against German forces in the Italian Alps and in France. At the conclusion of the war, Isao returned to Chicago and then to Los Angeles in 1950 with his new bride, Alice Ishii.

After a successful career as a Graphic Designer, Isao called upon his wartime experiences to produce a number of hauntingly beautiful paintings and sculptures and, in some cases, photographs combining the two. Isao also illustrated children's book on the subject of the Relocation experience, including Blue Jay in the Desert, Welcome Home Swallows, and The Spirit of Manzanar (written by his daughter, Junie). In the later books, the now elderly Kikuchi demonstrated his mastery of computer illustration. The Spirit of Manzanar is included in this website. He died in August 2017 at the age of 95.

Many of his carvings are now held in private collections in Southern California.
