= Yukio Okutsu =

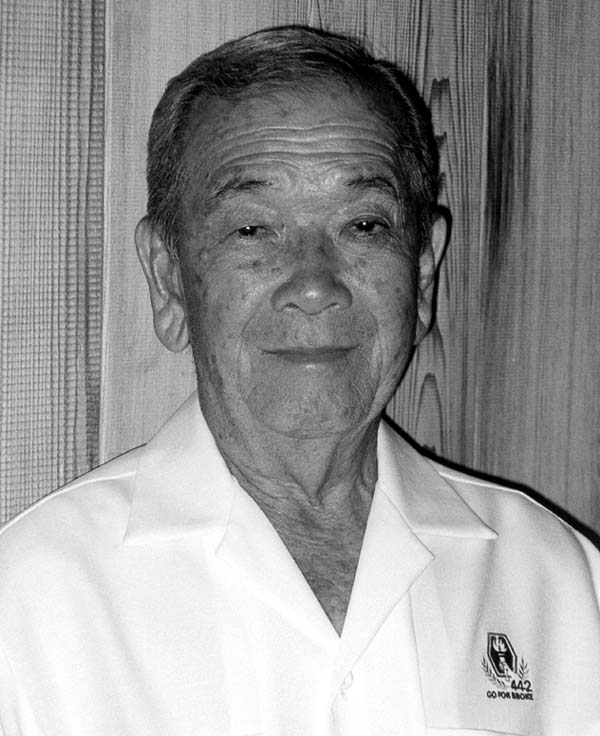
- Technical Sergeant Yukio Okutsu
- Born: November 3, 1921; Koloa, Hawaii
- Died: August 24, 2003 (aged 81); Hilo, Hawaii
- Burial place: East Hawaii Veterans Cemetery No. 2, Hilo, Hawaii
- Military career
- Allegiance: United States of America
- Branch: United States Army
- Service years: 1943 - 1945
- Rank: Technical Sergeant
- Unit: 442nd Regimental Combat Team
- Conflicts: World War II
- Awards: Medal of Honor; Purple Heart

Yukio Okutsu (Japanese: 奥津 幸雄, November 3, 1921 – August 24, 2003) was a United States Army soldier. He is best known for receiving the Medal of Honor because of his actions in World War II.

== Early life ==
Okutsu was born in Koloa, Hawaii to Japanese immigrant parents. He was a Nisei, which means that he was a second generation Japanese-American.

== Soldier ==
Okutsu joined the US Army in March 1943.

Okutsu volunteered to be part of the all-Nisei 442nd Regimental Combat Team

On April 7, 1945, Okutsu was serving as a technical sergeant in the 442nd Regimental Combat Team. During a battle on that day, on Mount Belvedere in Italy, he single-handedly destroyed three enemy machine gun emplacements. He was awarded the Army's second-highest decoration, the Distinguished Service Cross, for his actions.

A 1990s review of service records for Asian Americans who received the Distinguished Service Cross during World War II led to Okutsu's award being upgraded to the Medal of Honor. In a ceremony at the White House on June 21, 2000, he was presented with his Medal of Honor by President Bill Clinton. Twenty-one other Asian Americans also received the medal during the ceremony, all but seven of them posthumously.

Okutsu died at age 81, three years after receiving the Medal of Honor, and was buried in East Hawaii Veterans Cemetery No. 2, Hilo, Hawaii.

== Medal of Honor citation ==
His official Medal of Honor citation reads:

Technical Sergeant Yukio Okutsu distinguished himself by extraordinary heroism in action on 7 April 1945, on Mount Belvedere, Italy. While his platoon was halted by the crossfire of three machine guns, Technical Sergeant Okutsu boldly crawled to within 30 yards of the nearest enemy emplacement through heavy fire. He destroyed the position with two accurately placed hand grenades, killing three machine gunners. Crawling and dashing from cover to cover, he threw another grenade, silencing a second machine gun, wounding two enemy soldiers, and forcing two others to surrender. Seeing a third machine gun, which obstructed his platoon's advance, he moved forward through heavy small arms fire and was stunned momentarily by rifle fire, which glanced off his helmet. Recovering, he bravely charged several enemy riflemen with his submachine gun, forcing them to withdraw from their positions. Then, rushing the machine gun nest, he captured the weapon and its entire crew of four. By these single-handed actions he enabled his platoon to resume its assault on a vital objective. The courageous performance of Technical Sergeant Okutsu against formidable odds was an inspiration to all. Technical Sergeant Okutsu's extraordinary heroism and devotion to duty are in keeping with the highest traditions of military service and reflect great credit on him, his unit, and the United States Army.

== Awards and decorations ==

Badge	Combat Infantryman Badge		
1st row	Medal of Honor Upgraded from Distinguished Service Cross		
2nd row	Bronze Star Medal	Purple Heart	Army Good Conduct Medal
3rd row	American Campaign Medal	European–African–Middle Eastern Campaign Medal with 1 Campaign star	World War II Victory Medal
Unit awards	Presidential Unit Citation		

== See also ==
- List of Medal of Honor recipients
- List of Medal of Honor recipients for World War II
