= Allan M. Ohata =

Allen M. Ohata
- Born: September 13, 1918; Honolulu, Hawaii
- Died: October 17, 1977 (aged 59); Honolulu, Hawaii
- Burial place: National Memorial Cemetery of the Pacific
- Military career
- Allegiance: United States of America
- Branch: United States Army
- Rank: Captain
- Unit: 100th Infantry Battalion
- Conflicts: World War II
- Awards: Medal of Honor

Allan Masaharu Ohata (Japanese: 大畠 正春, September 13, 1918 – October 17, 1977) was a United States Army soldier. He is best known for receiving the Medal of Honor because of his actions in World War II.

== Early life ==
Ohata was born in Hawaii to Japanese immigrant parents. He was a Nisei, which means that he was a second generation Japanese-American.

== Soldier ==
One month before the Japanese attack on Pearl Harbor, Ohata joined the US Army in November 1941.

Ohata volunteered to be part of the all-Nisei 100th Infantry Battalion. which was mostly made up of Japanese Americans from Hawaii. He was originally awarded the Distinguished Service Cross. According to the story he shared with his brother, "[H]e held a hill by himself and a lot of people died except him. He said the enemy came from both sides, and [at] one point he came from one side and the enemy soldier came from the other end. The only reason he lived was because he saw the guy first."

== Medal of Honor citation ==
Ohata, Allan M.
Rank and organization:Staff Sergeant, U.S. Army, Company B, 100th Infantry Battalion (Separate)
Place and date:Cerasuolo, Italy, November 29, 1943
Entered service at:Schofield Barracks, Hawaii
Born:September 13, 1918, Honolulu, Hawaii
Citation:

Sergeant Allan M. Ohata distinguished himself by extraordinary heroism in action on 29 and November 30, 1943, near Cerasuolo, Italy. Sergeant Ohata, his squad leader, and three men were ordered to protect his platoon's left flank against an attacking enemy force of 40 men, armed with machine guns, machine pistols, and rifles. He posted one of his men, an automatic rifleman, on the extreme left, 15 yards from his own position. Taking his position, Sergeant Ohata delivered effective fire against the advancing enemy. The man to his left called for assistance when his automatic rifle was shot and damaged. With utter disregard for his personal safety, Sergeant Ohata left his position and advanced 15 yards through heavy machine gun fire. Reaching his comrade's position, he immediately fired upon the enemy, killing 10 enemy soldiers and successfully covering his comrade's withdrawal to replace his damaged weapon. Sergeant Ohata and the automatic rifleman held their position and killed 37 enemy soldiers. Both men then charged the three remaining soldiers and captured them. Later, Sergeant Ohata and the automatic rifleman stopped another attacking force of 14, killing four and wounding three while the others fled. The following day he and the automatic rifleman held their flank with grim determination and staved off all attacks. Staff Sergeant Ohata's extraordinary heroism and devotion to duty are in keeping with the highest traditions of military service and reflect great credit on him, his unit, and the United States Army.

== Awards and decorations ==

Badge	Combat Infantryman Badge		
1st row	Medal of Honor Upgraded from Distinguished Service Cross		Bronze Star Medal
2nd row	Army Good Conduct Medal	American Defense Service Medal with 'Foreign Service' clasp	American Campaign Medal
3rd row	Asiatic-Pacific Campaign Medal	European–African–Middle Eastern Campaign Medal with 1 Campaign star	World War II Victory Medal

== See also ==
- List of Medal of Honor recipients for World War II
- 442nd Regimental Combat Team
