= Battle of Vosges =

Battle of Vosges or Battle of the Vosges may refer to any of the following battles:

- Battle of Vosges (58 BC)
- Battle of the Vosges (1944), late-World War II battle in France
- Battle of Trippstadt, 1794 battle that occurred in the lower Vosges Mountains
- Alsace in the Battle of the Frontiers, 1914 battle of the First World War
- Battle of the Lost Battalion, events of October 1944
