= USS Republic =

Oceanliner and troop transport

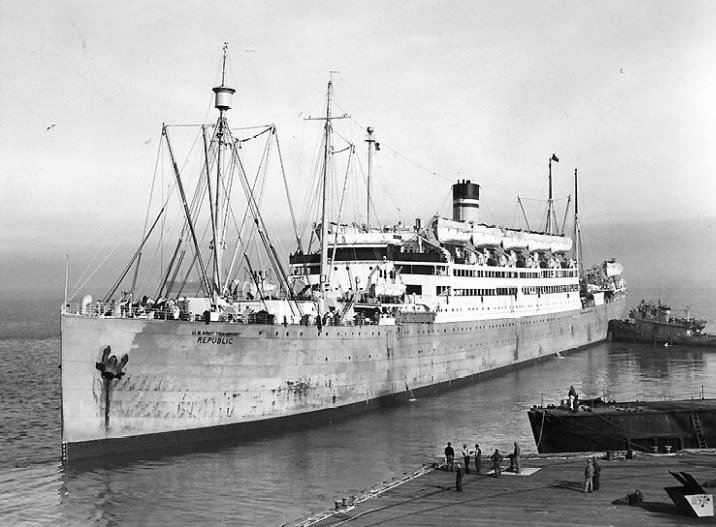
- USAT Republic at Hunters Point, post-World War II

History

United States
- Name: USS Republic (AP-33)
- Namesake: Serbia, Ulysses S. Grant, James Buchanan
- Owner: International Mercantile Marine Co.; Hamburg America Line; U.S. Navy; U.S. Army; U.S. Shipping Board; United States Lines
- Builder: Harland and Wolff, United Kingdom
- Yard number: 354
- Launched: 19 February 1903
- Christened: SS Servian
- Completed: 1903
- Acquired: Seized from Germany, 6 April 1917
- Maiden voyage: 14 September 1907, Hamburg–Boulogne-sur-Mer–Southampton–New York
- In service: Inactive: 1903 – 1907; Commercial: 1907 – Aug 1914; Inactive: Aug 1914 – Apr 1917; Navy: 2 Aug 1917 – Oct 1919; Army: 6 Oct 1919 – Mar 1921; Inactive: Mar 1921 – 1923; Commercial: 1924 – 1931; Army: 1931 – Jul 1941; Navy: 22 Jul 1941 – 27 Jan 1945; Army: Feb 1946 – May 1949
- Renamed: SS President Grant (1907); USS President Grant (ID-3014) (1917); USAT Republic (1919); USS President Buchanan (1921); USS Republic (AP-33) (1941); USAHS/USAT Republic (1945)
- Stricken: From the Navy: 2 February 1945
- Fate: Sold for scrap, 11 March 1952

General characteristics
- Displacement: 33,000 long tons (33,530 t)
- Length: 599 ft (183 m)
- Beam: 68 ft 2 in (20.78 m)
- Draft: 34 ft (10 m)
- Propulsion: 2 × quadruple-expansion engines; 2 × screws
- Speed: 14.5 knots (26.9 km/h; 16.7 mph)
- Complement: 712
- Armament: Jul – Aug 1941; 1 x 5"/51 caliber surface gun; 4 × 3"/23 caliber antiaircraft gun; 2 × 1-pounder guns; 2 × .30 cal. Lewis machine guns; October 1941 : 1 x 5"/51 caliber surface gun; 4 × 3"/50 caliber antiaircraft gun; 12 x 20 mm guns

USS Republic (AP-33) was a troop transport that served with the US Navy during World War II. In World War I she served with the Navy as USS President Grant (ID-3014) before being turned over to the Army and named Republic. The ship was renamed the President Buchanan in 1921 before reverting to Republic in 1924.

Originally christened as the SS Servian, she was built in 1903 by Harland and Wolff, Ltd. of Belfast for the Wilson & Furness-Leyland Line, a subsidiary of International Mercantile Marine Co. spearheaded by J.P. Morgan. After plans for a North Atlantic service collapsed, she spent four years at anchor in the Musgrave Channel in Belfast.

After being purchased by the Hamburg-American Packet Steamship Company (Hamburg-Amerikanische Packetfahrt-Aktien-Gesellschaft or HAPAG) in 1907, it was renamed the SS President Grant, the third ship named for Ulysses S. Grant. In August 1914, after seven years of trans-Atlantic passenger service, she took refuge at New York City when the outbreak of World War I made the high seas unsafe for German merchant ships. She was laid up at Hoboken, New Jersey and remained inactive for nearly three years until the United States entered the war in April 1917. The ship was seized when the United States officially declared war against Germany.

== World War I ==
Turned over to the Navy, she was commissioned USS President Grant (SP-3014) on 2 August 1917. During her operations as a troop transport, she made sixteen round trips between New York and ports of France, carrying a total of 40,104 servicemen on her eastbound passage, and a total of 37,025 servicemen on her westbound returns to New York.

== Between the wars ==
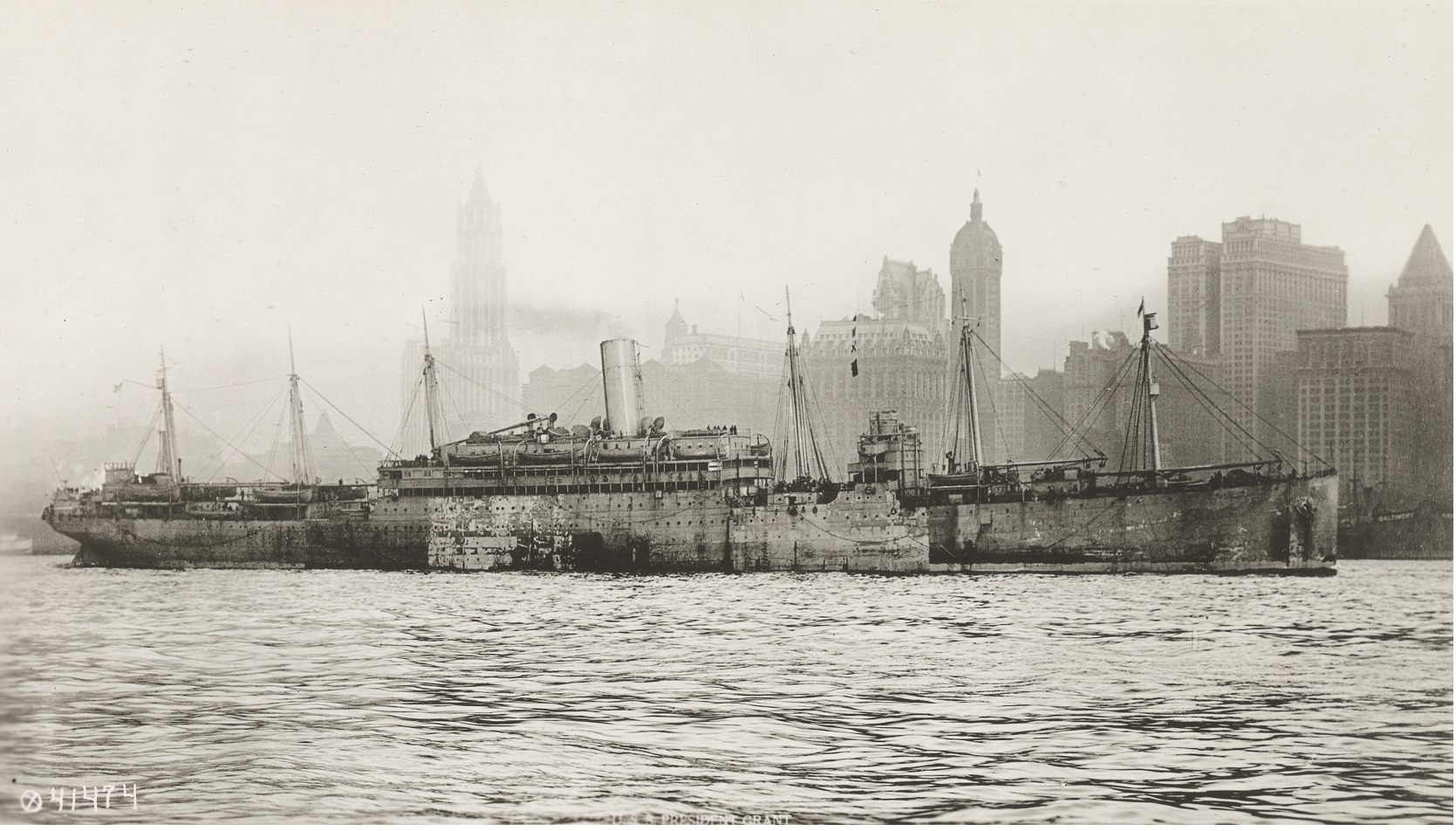
USS President Grant off Manhattan in March 1919

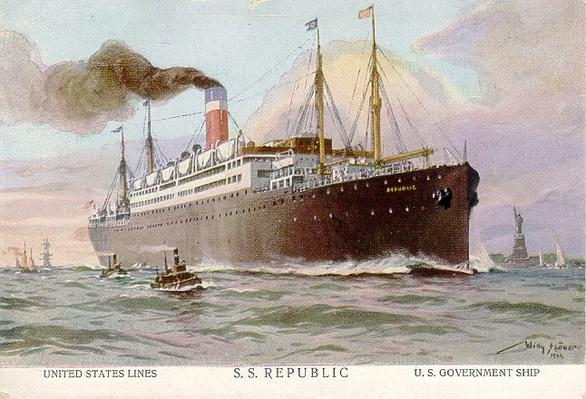
United States Line's Republic

President Grant was transferred to the Army 6 October 1919. During the period January to November 1920, she served as the United States Army Transport Republic and made two voyages repatriating Czechoslovak troops from Vladivostok to Trieste. After a trip to France, she was delivered to the United States Shipping Board (USSB) by the Army in March 1921. Until 1924, she lay at Norfolk, Virginia and then was placed on North Atlantic passenger service with United States Lines.

In 1931, she reverted to Army control as a troopship. After alterations, USAT Republic made three trips to San Francisco, Hawaii, and Manila. She later made two visits to China and one to Japan. In 1932, Far Eastern ports were excluded and she was confined to a regular New York-Honolulu run until June 1941.

USAT Republic was again taken over by the Navy and commissioned as USS Republic (AP-33) on 22 July 1941. Her armament consisted of one 5" and four 3" mounts. After completing a crossing from New York carrying troops to Iceland, Republic sailed for San Francisco.

On 21 November 1941 Republic left San Francisco for the Philippines by way of Hawaii with 2,666 (Note: 2,666 is the sum of officers and men given by Mayo. Thirty-six fewer, "2,630 troops," is the number given by Matloff. An even smaller total, 2,521, is indicated in the monograph Water Transportation For The United States Army 1939 – 1942 (Larson, 1944) by "some 181 officers and 2,340 enlisted men" on page 85.) Army officers, including Brig. Gen. Julian F. Barnes, and enlisted men and 18 civilians and flying cadets, reaching Pearl Harbor on 28 November. After overnight refueling she left port on the 29th to join six other vessels and assume the role of flagship for a convoy headed to the Philippines escorted by the USS Pensacola (CA-24). Of the other ships only the USAT Willard A. Holbrook carried troops. That convoy, generally known as the Pensacola Convoy (also seen as the "Republic Convoy"), (Note: Masterson uses "Republic Convoy" as well as some other references.) was being routed on the southern route to Manila by way of Port Moresby to avoid the Japanese mandated islands of the central route and on 6 December the convoy crossed the equator celebrating the largest Army Shellback initiation up to that time. Aboard Republic for that celebration was the ground element of the Army Air Forces 7th Heavy Bombardment Group whose B-17 bombers were taking off the same day from Hamilton Field, California to arrive over Hawaii during the attack on Pearl Harbor. Other embarked units were the 2nd Battalion, 131st Field Artillery, 36th Division. Texas National Guard (Note: 2nd Battalion, 131st Field Artillery was eventually sent on to Java and captured to become one of several "Lost Battalions" of WW II. This was a 36th Division Field Artillery unit and not the 36th Division infantry unit "Lost Battalion" surrounded by German forces in the Vosges Mountains on 24 October 1944. The other units, the 147th Field Artillery Regiment and the 148th Field Artillery Regiment were aboard the Holbrook in the same convoy.) and the 36th Signal Platoon.

== World War II ==
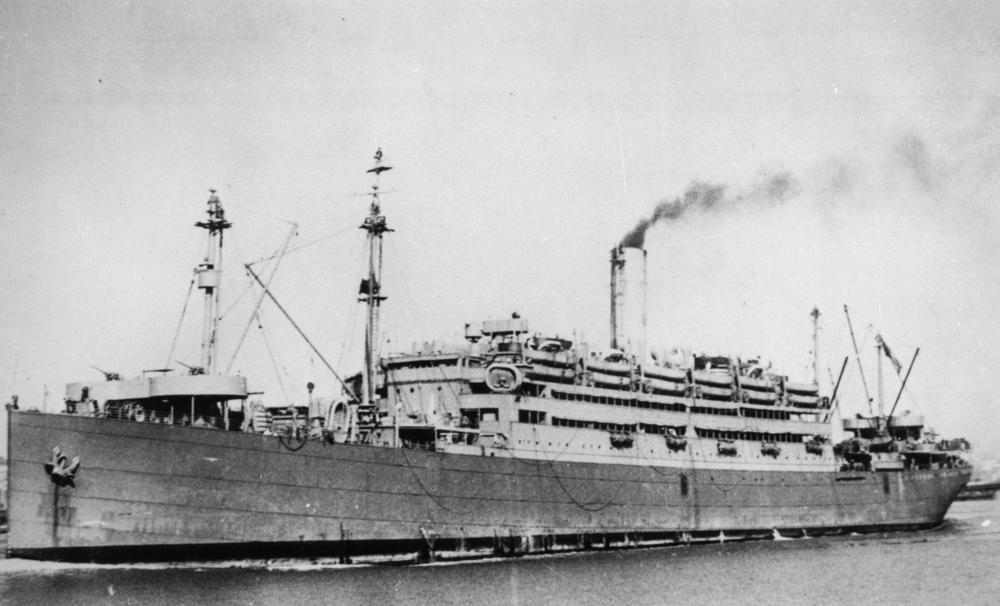
USS Republic arriving in Brisbane December 1941.

At eleven in the morning of 7 December Commander Clark received a message indicating an attack on Pearl Harbor that was first thought to be from an exercise until another message from Commander in Chief, U.S. Asiatic Fleet removed all doubt. Republic and other ships in the convoy improvised wartime measures by painting superstructures gray and searching cargo for weapons. In Republic's holds were found four British made 75-mm artillery pieces that men of the 453d Ordnance (Aviation) Bombardment Company, part of the 7th Heavy Bombardment Group, lashed to deck even though no ammunition was found. The Republic had been in Stateside dry-dock just prior to the 2nd Battalion's boarding, and had four 3-inch guns and one 5-inch gun (on the "fan-tail"). The Battalion manned these guns from 7 December until their arrival in Brisbane, Australia.

With Japanese forces reported only 300 miles away in the Ellice Islands the convoy was ordered to put into Suva, Fiji Islands while a decision was made on the convoy's destination. Army and Navy planners wanted the forces returned to defend Hawaii and that decision was made until reversed after meetings at the White House with the ultimate decision the convoy should proceed to Brisbane. On 12 December the convoy was ordered to sail for Australia with troops designated Task Force South Pacific under General Barnes who had orders from Australia to place himself under General MacArthur's command. While awaiting orders the ships of the convoy had been searched for defense weapons with ammunition for the 75s found aboard Holbrook along with smaller weapons suitable for anti aircraft defense.

On 22 December the convoy reached Brisbane under further escort by Australian and New Zealand warships and Task Force South Pacific became United States Forces in Australia (USFIA). That organization, originated aboard Republic at sea, became the nucleus and model for the supply organization functioning throughout the war in the South West Pacific Area. After debarking the troops, the Republic sailed on to Sydney.

Between March and November 1942 she served on the San Francisco-Honolulu run, completing a total of seven voyages. During 1943 and 1944, the Republic operated out of San Francisco, transporting troops and supplies to Honolulu and the Southwest Pacific. She called at Fiji, Samoa, Nouméa, Guadalcanal, Sydney, Funafuti, Hollandia and other ports.

Republic returned home in early 1945 and decommissioned at New Orleans 27 January 1945. She was struck from the Navy Register 2 February 1945 and turned over to the Army for conversion to a hospital ship, designated USAHS Republic.

== Postwar service ==
Republic was overhauled by the Waterman Steamship Company at Mobile, Alabama until August. In September 1945 she proceeded to Los Angeles where she was altered before departing for Honolulu. The Army cancelled her designation as a hospital ship while she was en route to Manila in February 1946. As USAT Republic, she embarked war veterans at Tacloban and Leyte bringing them back to San Francisco in late March 1946. On 19 June 1946 the ship, too large to enter the inner harbor, arrived at Naha, Okinawa.

In January 1948 it arrived in Seattle, Washington from Yokohama, Japan.

In the summer of 1948, US Army dependents and employees embarked in Seattle, WA for a voyage to Tokyo, Japan.

In May 1949, she was decommissioned by the Army Transport Service and returned to the Maritime Commission, after which she was laid up in the National Defense Reserve Fleet at Olympia, Washington. She was sold for scrap to the Bethlehem Steel Company on 11 March 1952.

== Bibliography ==
- Masterson, Dr. James R. (1949). U. S. Army Transportation In The Southwest Pacific Area 1941–1947. Washington, D. C.: Transportation Unit, Historical Division, Special Staff, U. S. Army.
- Matloff, Maurice; Snell, Edwin M. (1999). The War Department: Strategic Planning For Coalition Warfare 1941-1942. United States Army In World War II. Washington, DC: Center Of Military History, United States Army. LCCN 53-61477.
- Mayo, Lida (1991). The Technical Services—The Ordnance Department: On Beachhead And Battlefront. United States Army In World War II. Washington, DC: Center Of Military History, United States Army. LCCN 79014631.
- Morton, Lewis (1993). The War in the Pacific: The Fall Of The Philippines. United States Army In World War II. Washington, D.C.: Center Of Military History, United States Army. LCCN 53-63678.
- Thompson, George Raynor; Harris, Dixie R.; Oakes, Pauline M.; Terrett, Dulany (1957). The Technical Services—The Signal Corps: The Test (December 1941 to July 1943). United States Army In World War II. Washington, DC: Center Of Military History, United States Army. LCCN 56-60003.
