= Schirmeck concentration camp =

Second World War Nazi internment camp

Schirmeck
- Concentration camp
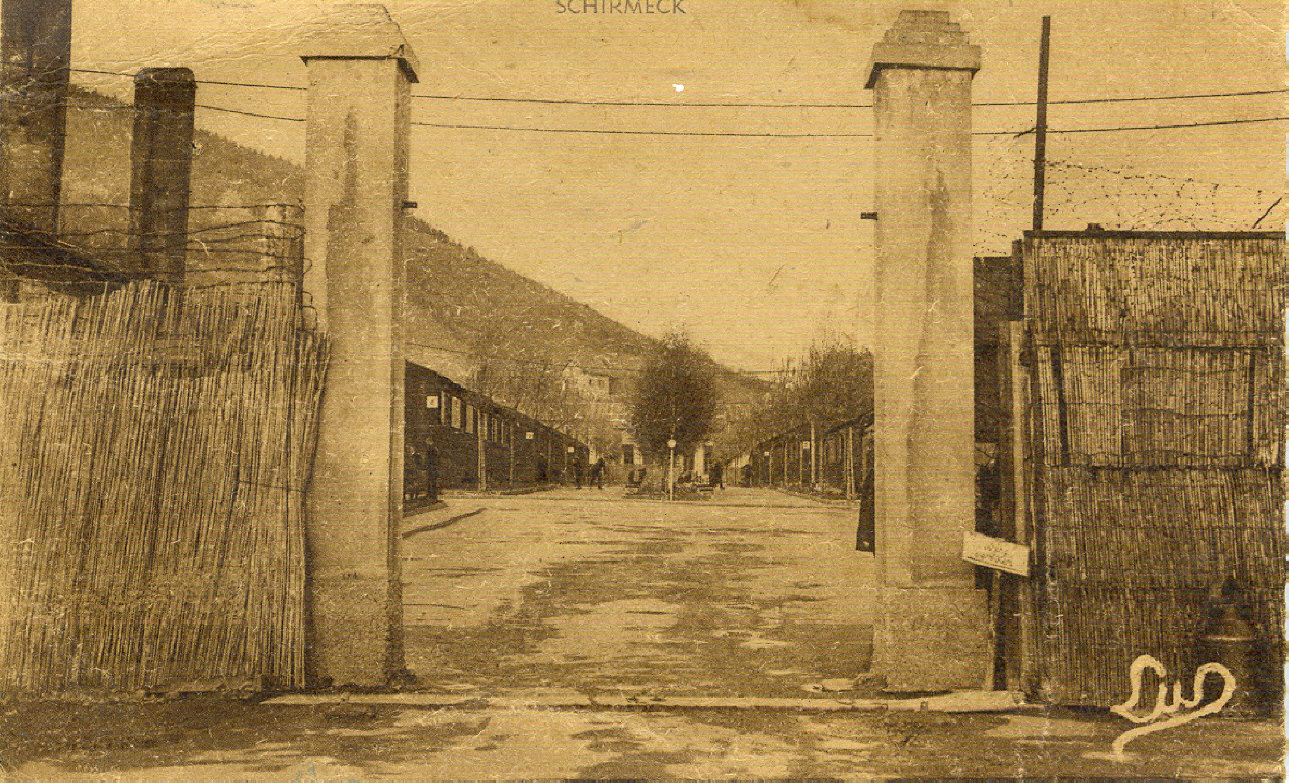
- The Schirmeck camp entrance, overlooking the men's camp in 1943. When the outpost camp was built, the new entrance bore the inscription "Arbeit macht frei", translates as "Work makes you free."

- Location of Schirmeck in France
- Coordinates: 48°28′45″N 7°12′34″E
- Location: Schirmeck, German-occupied France
- Operated by: French authorities (under German supervision); Nazi Germany
- Commandant: Karl Buck
- Original use: Prisoner-of-war camp
- Operational: 1940 – 1944
- Number of inmates: Up to 25,000
- Killed: 78

Schirmeck concentration camp, known in French as Camp de Schirmeck, in German Sicherungslager Vorbruck-Schirmeck, was a Nazi concentration camp located in the commune of Schirmeck, in the Bas-Rhin region of annexed Alsace, which operated from August 1940 to November 1944 during the German military administration in occupied France during World War II of Alsace.

It was intended for men and women from Alsace and Moselle who had resisted the Nazi regime, and for their families in reprisal. But in fact it took in prisoners from all over the world, as individual fates changed and Nazi repressive laws evolved. In particular, more than a hundred resistance fighters belonging to the Alliance network, 108 of whom were murdered on the night of September 1 to 2, 1944, transported to the Struthof camp for execution along with 360 other prisoners.

== Designation ==
The German authorities used different names for the camp, which apparently depended on the reason for imprisonment: "labor education camp" (AEL) was used for violations of the work regulations, 'security camp' for 'anti-German demonstrations', and the term 'Schirmeck concentration camp' is also found for the admission of resistance fighters.

== History ==
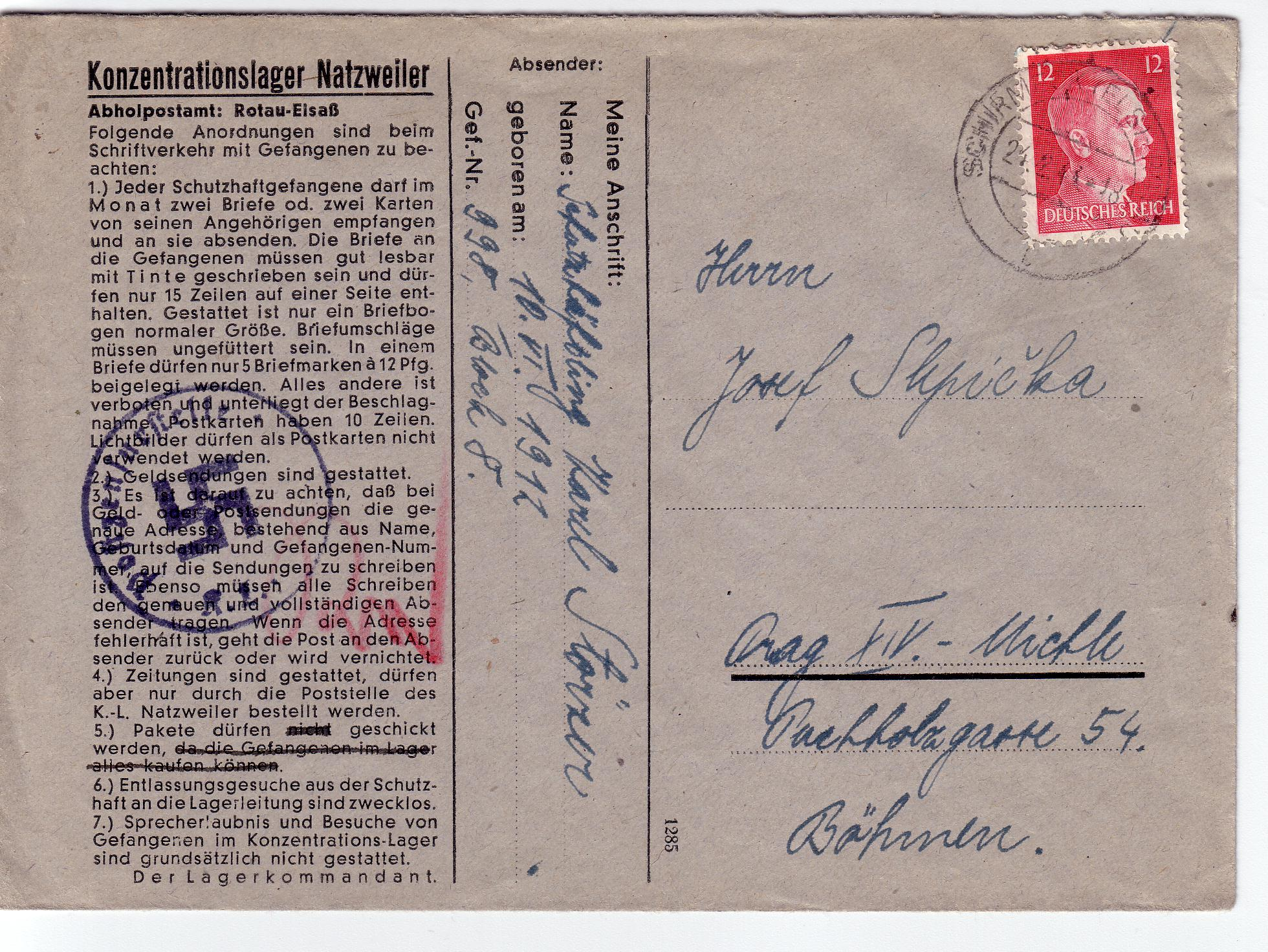
Old letter cover from the Natzweiler-Struthof concentration camp, 1944.

Schirmeck-Vorbruck was one of the numerous forced labor camps that existed under National Socialist rule alongside the system of actual concentration camps (KZ) under the control of the Concentration Camps Inspectorate. In the memory of the prisoners in particular, these forced labor camps are often perceived as concentration camps, and the conditions of detention there were similar to those in the concentration camps. Due to its proximity to the Natzweiler-Struthof concentration camp, located four kilometers to the southeast, the camp is often mistaken for a subcamp of this main camp.

=== Creation ===
During the Phoney War, the French Armed Forces had a small camp of six barracks built in this protected spot in the Bruche valley, to accommodate refugees from the front.

After the defeat, the Germans opened it on August 2, 1940, on the initiative of Gauleiter Robert Heinrich Wagner, head of the Gau in Baden-Alsace, after consultation with the local commander of the Security Police and SD (BdS) Dr. Gustav Adolf Scheel, commander of the Sicherheitsdienst (SD) in the south-west. The Germans enlarged the camp and transformed it into a re-education camp, Erziehungslager or Umschulungslager, then into a security camp, Sicherungslager. The initiative was taken by the SD, the Schutzstaffel (SS) security service.

The site was located on the outskirts of the municipality of La Broque (German: Vorbruck), which was united with Schirmeck under German administration to form one large municipality. The camp was gradually expanded until 1944 and was divided into three areas:

- The main gate led into the outer camp or forecourt, where the canteen, Gestapo interrogation rooms, dog kennels, workshops, garages, the camp commandant's office and the guards' quarters were located.
- The main camp contained eleven wooden barracks for male prisoners, the roll call area and several outbuildings such as the kitchen, sanitary facilities and the infirmary.
- From July 1941, the upper camp consisted of three stone barracks in which the female prisoners were housed. In 1943, a building called the "Festsaal" was built in the upper camp with a hall for 2,000 people, in which the camp commandant held "speeches" to the prisoners on Sunday mornings. On the first floor of the "Festsaal", 26 individual cells were used for the more severe solitary confinement.

The entire camp was double-fenced with barbed wire and had four watchtowers equipped with machine guns. Guards with service dogs patrolled around the camp. It was subordinate to the "penal institutions in Alsace-Lorraine" and served as a place of detention for the police, the SD and the Gestapo. Two functions can be distinguished:

- "Education camp": Around 60 to 70% of the prisoners were committed by order of the BdS because they had resisted the 'Germanization' of Alsace-Lorraine. Reasons for committal could include the use of the French language, wearing berets, opposition to the Germanization of family names or criticism of National Socialists. The camp was intended to "re-educate" these prisoners, who were held for three to six months and had to sign a declaration upon their release in which they pledged to maintain absolute silence about the camp.
- "Security camp": Schirmeck-Vorbruck was used by the Gestapo to house pre-trial detainees who were held in the camp for between seven and 21 days. Prisoners who had been arrested on the basis of a "protective custody order" from the Reich Main Security Office were temporarily detained in Schirmeck-Vorbruck and then transferred to other prisons or concentration camps, in particular to Natzweiler-Struthof or Dachau concentration camp.

== Commander ==
The camp commander was SS-Hauptsturmführer Karl Buck, who had already run other concentration camps. Buck was sentenced to death in two trials before British and French military courts after the end of the war, pardoned to life imprisonment and released from French custody in April 1955. Buck's adjutant and camp commander was Robert Wünsch, a criminal investigation officer, and Karl Nussberger was the leader of the guard team. The guard team initially consisted of 40, later up to 95 police officers, who were replaced every six weeks. A total of 1200 police officers were deployed as guards in Schirmeck-Vorbruck. The camp administration consisted of around 100 police officers, mostly SS members. They were employed, for example, as purchasing managers, administration managers, dog handlers or heads of the effects room.

== Camp life ==
Command was entrusted to SS-Hauptsturmführer Karl Buck, who held it until the end. Violence and terror characterize this man with the wooden leg, whose inmates evoke the unbearable look in his eyes. Schirmeck was a harsh and degrading labor camp. Interrogations, indoctrination, harassment, bullying, beatings, physical and moral torture, deprivation and sometimes murder were all used by the Nazis. The only way to get around was to run.

In everyday life, the prisoners were exposed to the arbitrariness of the guards. Charles Pabst, a pastor arrested for "anti-German sentiments", reported being slapped and punched in the face. Even on rainy days, new arrivals were forced to crawl or jump along the camp paths in the mud. According to Pabst, such harassment was called "Circus Buck" by the guards in reference to the name of the camp director.

A Vorhof, or outpost camp, includes a police station (Kommandantur) and small cells used as interrogation rooms by the Gestapo, adjacent to Karl Buck's residence. At the far end was the women's camp, whose head guard was an Alsatian woman. The camp's labor kommandos, particularly those at the Hersbach stone quarries and the Entzheim air base, provided the Nazis with a source of income worth up to 150,000 Reichsmark per month.

The Schirmeck camp is 6 km from the Struthof camp, built by Schirmeck inmates as a Nacht und Nebel labor camp in the mountains.

=== Re-education camp ===
This concerns prisoners imprisoned and - a priori - released at the end of their sentence. This is the case, for example, of the 106 young people from Hochfelden arrested for having publicly celebrated the Bastille Day on 14 July 1941, or the families of those shot at Ballersdorf in 1943. Or Pierre Seel, imprisoned until May 1941 for his homosexuality, repeatedly tortured, then released, drafted into the German army as an Alsatian and transferred to the Eastern Front.

Around 10,000 Alsatians and Moselle inhabitants passed through the camp, with periods of detention ranging from a few days to several months.

The very name of Schirmeck terrorized the Alsatians, and this prayer was circulated under the cloak:

Lieber Herrgot, mach' mich stumm,
Dass ich nicht nach Schirmeck kumm!
Lieber Herrgot, mach' mich blind,
Dass ich alles sehr schön find!
Lieber Herrgot, mach' mich taub
Dass ich alle Lügen glaub'!

Dear Lord, make me mute,
That I do not come to Schirmeck!
Dear Lord, make me blind,
That I find everything very beautiful!
Dear Lord, make me deaf,
That I believe all lies!

SOS was also said to stand for "Schweige oder Schirmeck", i.e. "Shut up or it's Schirmeck".

=== Transit camp ===
For others, it was a transit camp, an interrogation center where local and national resistance fighters, Jews, Polish miners, Germans opposed to Nazism who had taken refuge in France, etc., were detained before being sent to concentration or extermination camps.

== Prisoners ==
Most of the prisoners in Schirmeck-Vorbruck were French, but there were also Americans, Belgians, Germans, English, Poles, Romanians, Russians and Scandinavians. The prisoners included so-called "work refusers", "professional criminals", beggars, escape helpers, clergymen, homosexuals, illegal border crossers, opponents of the Nazi regime, prostitutes and conscientious objectors.

By September 1942, the camp had 1,400 inmates. The total number of camp inmates in Schirmeck-Vorbruck is estimated at up to 25,000; on average, 1,000 men and 250 women were held in separate camp areas.

=== Feeding ===
The prisoners' rations were set at 1,200 kcal. Of the 1.05 RM available per day to feed a prisoner, 40 pfennigs were diverted to a black fund. According to prisoner reports, prisoners lost up to half their body weight within a few weeks.

=== Experiments with humans ===
From May 1943, the physician Eugen Haagen carried out typhus fever experiments on around 25 Polish prisoners. Two prisoners died in the experiments, which were the subject of the Nuremberg Doctors' Trial after the end of the war.

=== Prisoner typology ===
Prisoners wear a distinctive piece of sewn cloth: red for political prisoners, green for illegal immigrants, yellow for Jews, Poles and Russians, blue for clergymen, prostitutes and homosexuals, checkered for antisocials and commoners, purple for Jehovah's Witnesses.

New prisoners were dressed in old Wehrmacht uniforms. In contrast to the usual marking of prisoners in concentration camps, the markings varied in this security camp. Instead of angles, colored pieces of cloth were issued, blue ones for Jews, for example.

=== Forced labor ===
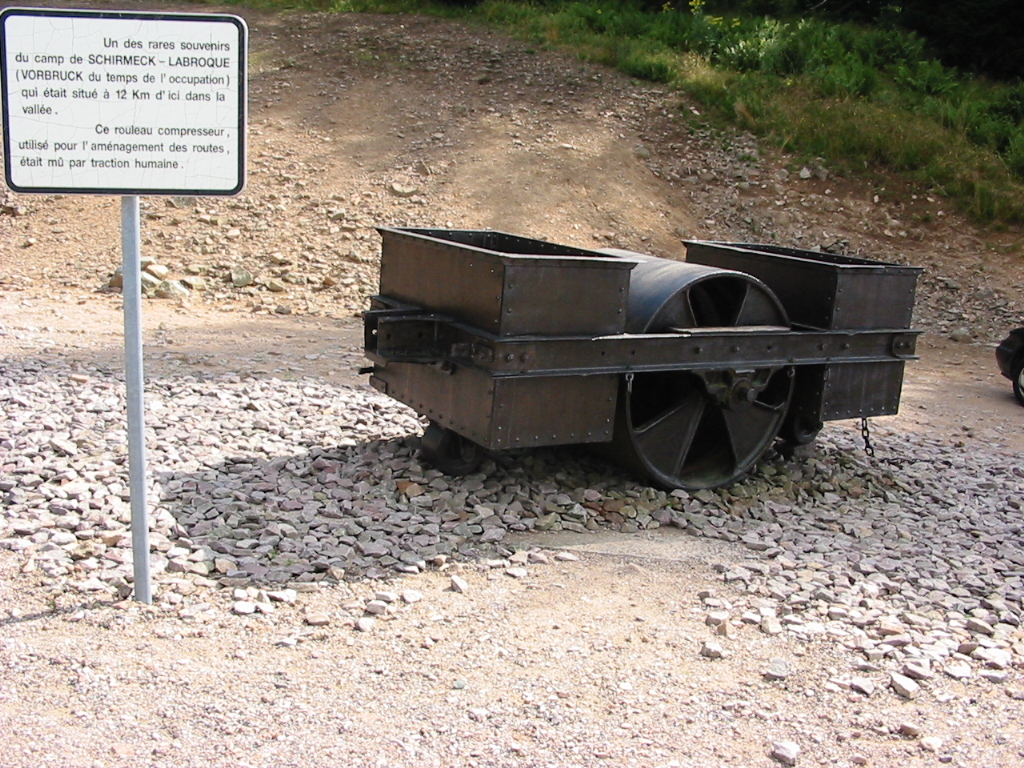
Road roller that had to be pulled by hand.

The prisoners had to perform forced labor inside and outside the camp. The external detachments included a quarry in Herbach, forestry work, repairing railroad tracks and road construction, where up to ten prisoners had to pull a heavy roller. A satellite camp existed on the site of today's Strasbourg-Entzheim airport, 35 kilometers away. Other prisoners were "rented out" to companies by the camp commandant's office. At the end of 1943, the Daimler-Benz company set up a production facility right next to the camp grounds, where prisoners had to produce spare parts.

=== Deaths ===
76 deaths are registered in the Schirmeck registry office; however, it is estimated that up to 500 people died. After the crematorium in the Natzweiler concentration camp was completed, the bodies of Schirmeck prisoners were cremated there. 107 members of the "Alliance" resistance network, who had been imprisoned in Schirmeck-Vorbruck since May 1944, were murdered in Natzweiler on the night of September 1 to 2, 1944.

Among the internees executed at Schirmeck were :

- Antoine Becker, imprisoned on August 2, 1944. Former commissioner of the Renseignements généraux in Strasbourg, divisional police commissioner in Marseille, he was arrested for having taken part in the repression of the Karl Roos network. He was murdered on his way to Struthof.
- Joseph Schmidlin, a Catholic priest who opposed Nazism and died there on January 10, 1944.
- Ceslav Sieradzki, an Alsatian resistance fighter of Polish origin and member of the Black Hand, who was murdered there on December 12, 1941.
- In his autobiography, Pierre Seel, an Alsatian who was interned there for homosexuality, describes the execution of a prisoner who was mauled by guard dogs in the roll call area in front of his fellow prisoners, testified in his book to the murder of his lover on the Place d'Appel in front of all the inmates.

== Liberation ==
The camp was dissolved in August 1944 and the majority of the prisoners were deported to the German Reich. Another security camp was set up in the Sicherungslager Rotenfels district of Gaggenau. The 1,600 prisoners interned there had to perform forced labor in the Daimler-Benz factories and other companies. Other prisoners were transferred to the Außenlager Haslach in Kinzigtal and Sulz am Neckar subcamps of the Natzweiler-Struthof concentration camp. Temporarily, 700 prisoners were also imprisoned in Bastion XII of Rastatt Fortress, as other camps were overcrowded.

On November 22, 1944, the BdS ordered the final dissolution of the Schirmeck-Vorbruck camp. After the escape of the guards, around 300 female prisoners remained in the camp, some of whom found refuge with local residents. On November 24, 1944, United States Army Army soldiers liberated the camp, which had previously been looted by the local population. Most of the prisoners deported to the German Reich remained prisoners until April 1945.

Between January 1945 and December 1949, French collaborators were interned in the former security camp. The mayor of La Broque's plan to build a museum and memorial on the camp site failed in 1952. The camp was demolished in the mid-1950s and the remaining building materials were sold. A housing estate was built on the site; two buildings were preserved and are still in use today: The former camp commandant's office and a factory building. Today, the victims of Schirmeck are commemorated by a memorial plaque at the former camp commandant's office, a memorial stele near the railroad station and a memorial stone at the Schirmeck cemetery. In June 2005, the Alsace-Moselle Memorial was opened on the outskirts of Schirmeck, which deals with the history of the region. Part of the exhibition is dedicated to the Schirmeck-Vorbruck camp.

== Sources ==
- Benz, Wolfgang; Distel, Barbara (2009). "Vorwort". In Benz, Wolfgang; Distel, Barbara (eds.). Der Ort des Terrors. Geschichte der nationalsozialistischen Konzentrationslager. Arbeitserziehungslager, Ghettos, Jugendschutzlager, Polizeihaftlager, Sonderlager, Zigeunerlager, Zwangsarbeiterlager. Vol. 9. München: C. H. Beck. pp. 7–15. ISBN 978-3-406-57238-8.
- Fischer, Wolfram (1994). Exodus von Wissenschaften aus Berlin: Fragestellungen – Ergebnisse – Desiderate. Berlin: Walter de Gruyter. ISBN 3-11-013945-6.
- Neceu, Cédric (2008). "Das Sicherungslager Schirmeck-Vorbruck". In Doerry, Janine (ed.). NS-Zwangslager in Westdeutschland, Frankreich und den Niederlanden. Paderborn: Schöningh. pp. 61–76. ISBN 978-3-506-76458-4.
- Pflock, Andreas (2009). "Sicherungslager Schirmeck-Vorbruck". In Benz, Wolfgang; Distel, Barbara (eds.). Der Ort des Terrors. Geschichte der nationalsozialistischen Konzentrationslager. Arbeitserziehungslager, Ghettos, Jugendschutzlager, Polizeihaftlager, Sonderlager, Zigeunerlager, Zwangsarbeiterlager. Vol. 9. München: C. H. Beck. pp. 521–533. ISBN 978-3-406-57238-8.
- Pflock, Andreas (2006). "Sicherungslager Schirmeck-Vorbruck – Ein erster Überblick über Ereignisgeschichte und Rezeption". Gedenkstättenrundbrief 133/2006 (PDF). Berlin. pp. 15–26.
- Seel, Pierre (1996). Ich, Pierre Seel, deportiert und vergessen: Ein Bericht. Anmerk. u. Nachw. v. Mario Kramp. Köln: Jackwerth. ISBN 3-932117-20-4.
