= Operation Waldfest =

Nazi operation towards France

- Part of the Western Front of World War II
- Location of Schirmeck, the German HQ during the operation, in France
Date	September–November 1944
Location	Vosges mountains, France
Result	German withdrawal after the destruction of local villages during scorched earth operations

Belligerents
Germany	Maquis; United Kingdom

Casualties and losses
Unknown	France: 110 Maquise fighters killed 376 civilians killed or executed 3,762 civilians deported to concentration camps 11,000 civilians deported as forced labour U.K.: 39 SAS soldiers executed

Operation Waldfest (German: Aktion Waldfest) was a Nazi German scorched earth operation and counter measure to French resistance activity in the Vosges mountains of German-occupied France during World War II. It was carried out in two stages, between September and November 1944, by units of the Wehrmacht and Allgemeine SS. The operation's aim was to counter the Allied Operation Loyton, to disrupt the local French resistance, the Maquis, to destroy local villages in order to prevent them serving as shelter for Allied forces in the upcoming winter and to deport all men of fighting age in the area to Germany as forced labour.

The operation led to the destruction of 7,500 buildings, the execution of 39 captured SAS soldiers as part of Hitler's Commando Order, saw almost 1,500 French civilians killed in the fighting or executed and close to 14,000 French civilians deported to concentration camps or as forced labour. Of the almost 3,800 civilians deported to concentration camps, two thirds died there. After the war, a number of German Wehrmacht and SS officials were tried and convicted for their involvement.

The operation shares its name with another German offensive in eastern France during World War I which was also titled Waldfest.

== Etymology ==
Waldfest is a compound word, made up of the German words Wald (forest) and Fest (fest, feast).

== Background ==
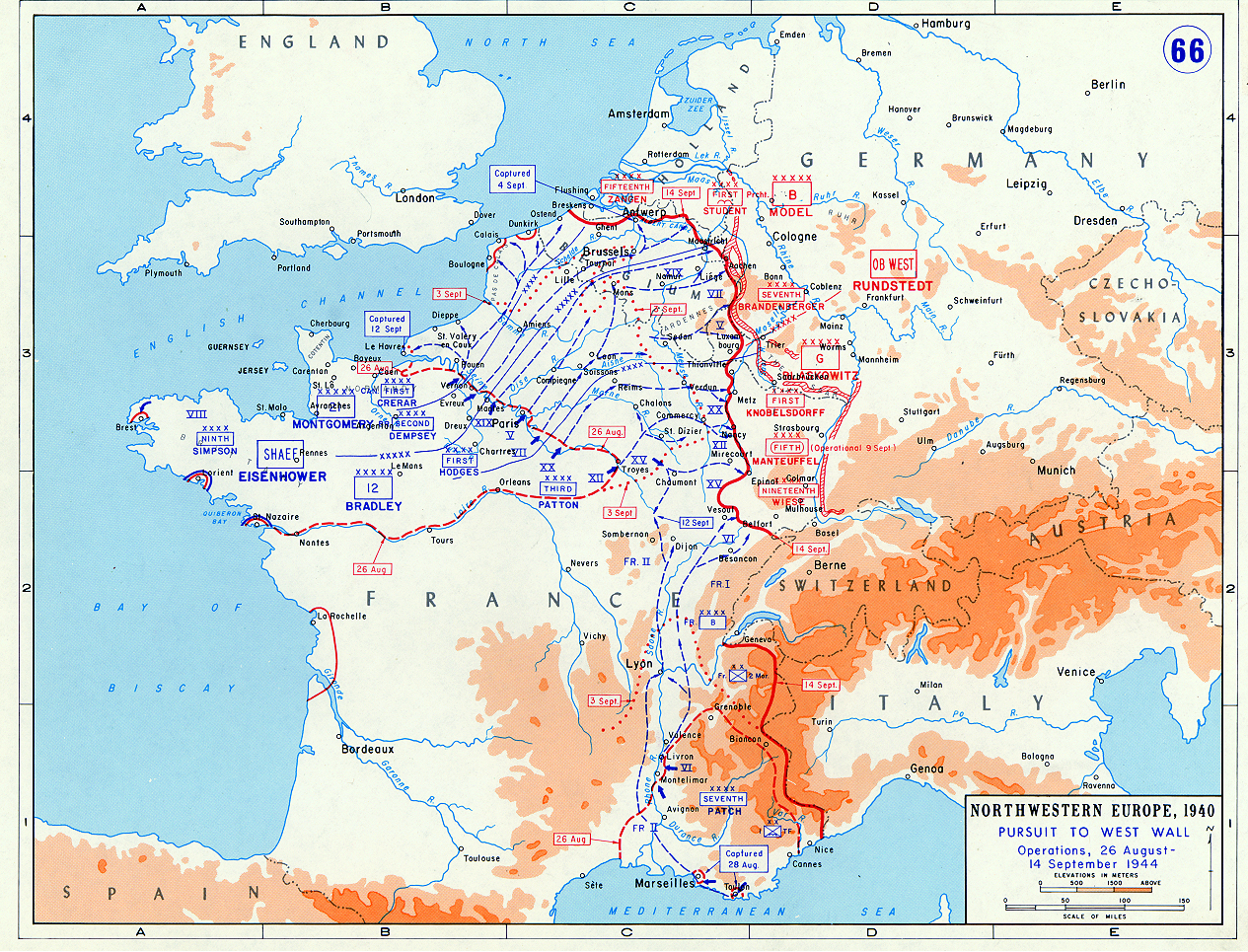
Western Front in 1944

Following the successful Allied Invasion of Normandy on 6 June 1944 and before the Liberation of Paris on 26 August, German forces in the Vosges mountains were ordered to establish a defensive position west of the ridge line of the mountains, titled the Schutzwall West (Protective Wall West). Up to 30,000 Hitler Youth members from Germany were brought in to help with the construction of the fortified line. Planned as a massive fortification stretching from southern Belgium to the Swiss border, in practice little of it was completed because of a lack of resources, but also because of harassment of the work groups by the Maquis.

The German plan was to destroy all villages in front of this protective wall to eliminate any shelter for Allied forces in the upcoming winter. The local population was to be evacuated and the male population aged between 15 and 60 was to be deported to Germany as forced labour. This policy of scorched earth had previously been predominately applied in eastern Europe but not on the Western front.

An order from Wilhelm Keitel, Chief of the German Armed Forces High Command, from 8 July 1944 stated that all able-bodied civilians that were in any way involved or suspected to be involved with local resistance were to be taken to transit camps and deported to Germany as forced labour. A subsequent order by Hermann Balck, commander of the Army Group G, from 2 November 1944 stated that all German forces in the Vosges mountains were to withdraw to the pre-determined defensive line. The area west of it was to be destroyed and any assets like livestock and food evacuated. The local population was to be either deported, as ordered by Keitel, or concentrated in one part of the village. These parts were to be selected so that they could be taken under artillery fire while the remaining parts of villages were to be destroyed. All bridges were to be rendered unusable, and enemy forces should not be able to find any habitable building during the cold winter season.

The region east of the ridge line of the Vosges mountains had become part of Germany after 1940, as it had been from 1870 to 1918, and was, at the time, predominantly German-speaking. Virtually no active resistance existed in the eastern part while, in the western part, it greatly increased in mid-1944.

== Operation Waldfest ==
=== Organisation ===
Operation Waldfest was carried out in two parts, Waldfest 1 and Waldfest 2. The importance of Waldfest can be seen in the fact that Heinrich Himmler himself took part in a conference at Gérardmer on 6 September 1944 to ensure that the German border in the west was defended at all costs.

Wehrmacht responsibility for Waldfest lay with the Generals Erich von Kirchbach and Hermann Balck. For the Gestapo and SS, Carl Oberg, SS and police leader for France (originally based at Nancy but relocated to Fraize in mid-September), Friedrich Stuhr, SS and police leader in Alsace, and Erich Isselhorst, Commander of the Sicherheitspolizei in Baden and Alsace.

The main base for the operation was Schirmeck, location of the Vorbruck-Schirmeck concentration camp, and commanded by Karl Buck. Schirmeck was a subcamp of the Natzweiler-Struthof concentration camp.

The German Wehrmacht and SS units were supported by French collaborators and French militia.

=== Execution ===
Waldfest 1 began in September 1944, under the command of Isselhorst and his deputy, Wilhelm Schneider, and was organised from Strassburg, after the Wehrmacht had been unable to defeat the local resistance movement. Isselhorst's efforts were successful and the SAS agents in the region, part of Operation Loyton, were either captured or killed. The first stage of the operation lasted from 1 to 30 September 1944. The operation was carried out by small Einsatzkommandos, varying in strength from 30 to 100 men, which were supported by Wehrmacht Jagdkommandos (Hunting commandos) under Generalmajor Franz Vaterrodt, based in Strasbourg.

Waldfest 2, the second stage of the operation, lasted from 1 October to November 1944. It targeted the local resistance, the Groupe Mobile d'Alsace– GMA, but also the civilian population and towns and villages.

The Vallée du Rabodeau, which had already been targeted in the first phase on 24 September, when 424 civilians were deported to concentration camps, of which 362 were killed, was hit a second time on 5 and 6 October. This time, 392 young men were arrested and deported, of which 246 perished. A third attack, the most violent, on the valley took place on 8 November. This time, almost 8,000 civilians were deported as forced labour, also some could be freed on the way by the approaching French Army. The events in the Vallée du Rabodeau led Charles de Gaulle to name it "The Valley of Tears" after liberation.

Operation Waldfest came to a definite hold when the region was liberated by the 100th US Infantry Division in late November 1944, as part of VI Corps and Operation Dogface.

== Outcome ==
=== Murder of captured SAS soldiers ===
Isselhorst ordered the execution of the captured British SAS members, as well as a number of French civilians, three French priests and four US airmen. The prisoners were taken over the Rhine river on trucks to Gaggenau on 21 November 1944. The leader of the execution commando, Karl Beck, thought it unwise to leave mass graves of shot allied soldiers in an area so close to the front line. The prisoners were initially kept in a local jail, but then on or shortly after 25 November, taken to a local forest and shot in the head in a bomb crater. One prisoner attempted to escape, but was also killed.

=== French civilian population ===
Operation Waldfest saw 376 civilians executed and 110 Maquis fighters killed in action. A further 1,000 civilians died in bombardments. It saw 3,762 civilians deported to concentration camps, of which two thirds were killed.

Over 11,000 civilians from the Vosges mountains were deported to Germany as forced labour, either directly or as part of the Service du travail obligatoire. In post-war France they were not awarded the status as deported as they did not meet the criteria of having been held in prisons or concentration camps. Only in the 1970s were the deported awarded the title of "Patriot deported to Germany" (French: Patriote transféré en Allemagne). Germany only started compensating these victims from April 2000 onward, by which time few were still alive, and then only under very strict criteria.

Waldfest also saw the destruction of over 7,500 buildings in the region. Saint-Dié-des-Vosges, where 2,000 houses were destroyed, burned for five days after having been set alight on 14 November and was liberated by the US Army on 23 November. It was the most-destroyed city of eastern France during the war.

== Post-war ==
After the end of the war, Major Eric Barkworth of the 2nd Special Air Service Regiment was tasked with establishing what had happened to the missing captured SAS members. His efforts resulted in the prosecution and conviction of some of the culprits.

For the murder of the SAS parachutists, Erich Isselhorst, Karl Oberg and Wilhelm Schneider were sentenced to death by a British military tribunal in Wuppertal in June 1946, with Isselhorst handed over to the French. General Willy Seeger, in charge of an involved reserve Wehrmacht division in Alsace at the time, was sentenced to three years in jail and Helmut Schlierbach to ten years for their role while a sixth accused, Julius Gehrum, was found not guilty of the charge and released. though he was later sentenced to death by the French in May 1947 (p 379 - "The Nazi Hunters" - Damien Lewis - 2015).

Isselhorst was once more sentenced to death in May 1947, now by a French military tribunal, and executed in Strasbourg on 23 February 1948. Schneider was executed by the British at Hameln on 23 January 1947 while Oberg's sentence was commuted to life in prison. He was released in 1962.

Karl Buck, commander of the Schirmeck camp, was sentenced to death by both a British and a French military court, had his sentenced commuted to life and was released in 1955. He was charged on seven more occasions in West Germany but never convicted and died a free man in 1977.

Hermann Balck was sentenced by a French military court in Colmar to 20 years of hard labour for his role in the scorched earth operations but never extradited.

Hans-Dietrich Ernst, involved in the deportation of the Jews of Angers, was also part of Waldfest and sentenced to death in absentia on three occasions by France, but never extradited.

== Commemoration ==
In 2015 the German-French dual-language book Die Männer von Saint-Dié: Erinnerungen an eine Verschleppung – Les hommes de Saint-Dié: Souvenirs d'une déportation (The men of Saint-Dié: Memories of deportation) was published jointly by the Association des déportés de Mannheim and the Gesamtschule Mannheim-Herzogenried, a school from Mannheim, Germany. It contains the eyewitness accounts of 60 French forced labourers taken to Mannheim from Saint-Dié-des-Vosges.
