= Laurent Furst =

French politician

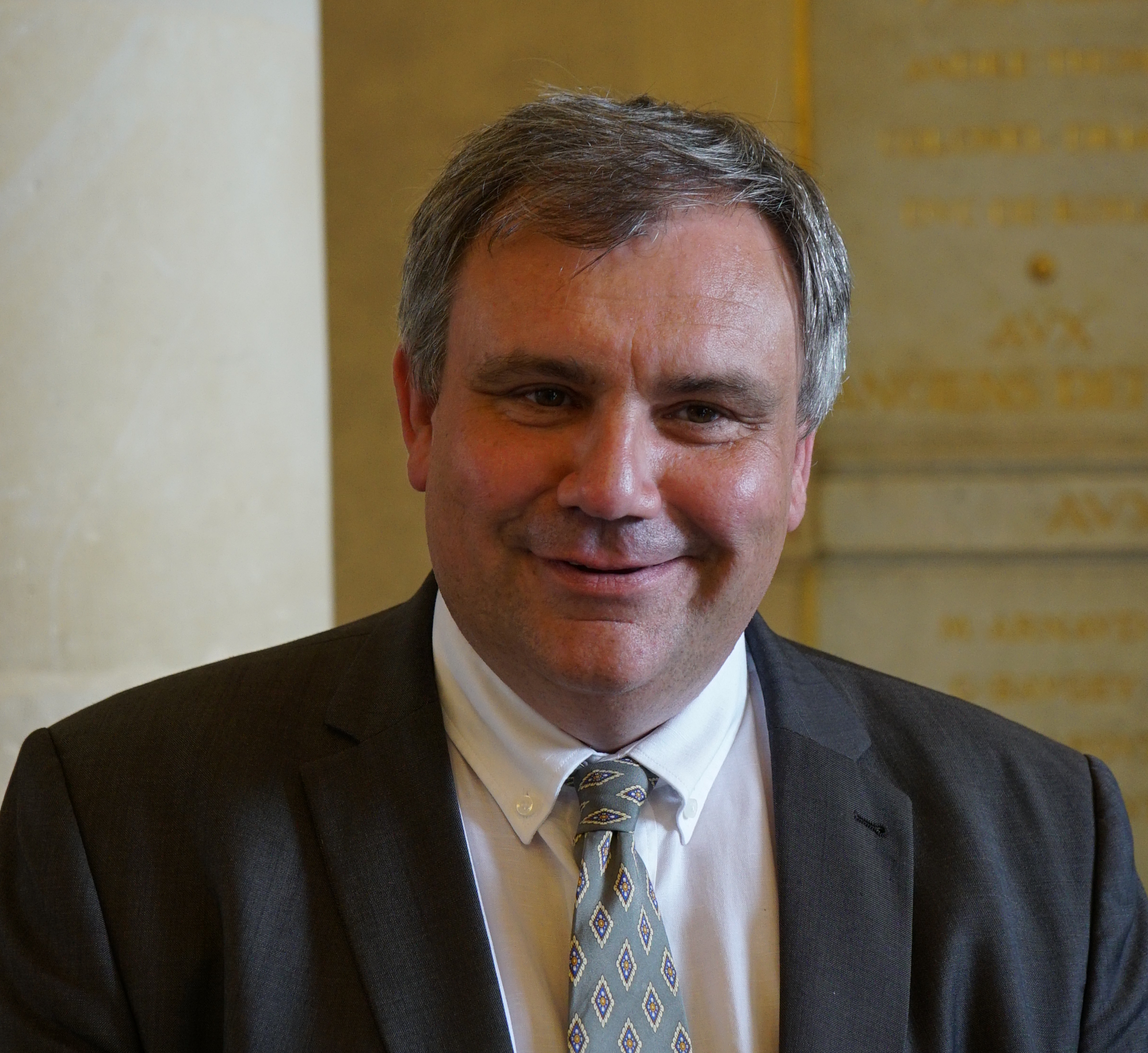

Deputy for Bas-Rhin's 6th constituency
- In office 20 June 2012 – 27 June 2020
- Preceded by: Alain Ferry
- Succeeded by: Philippe Meyer

Personal details
- Born: 19 May 1965 (age 61) Colmar, Haut-Rhin, France
- Party: LR
- Profession: Hospital director

Laurent Furst (born 19 May 1965) is a French politician of the Republicans who had served as a deputy of the National Assembly from 2012 to 2020, representing Bas-Rhin's 6th constituency.

== Political career ==
Furst was elected to the National Assembly in 2012 having served as mayor of Molsheim since 1995. In parliament, he serves on the Defence Committee. In addition to his committee assignments, he is a member of the French-Slovak Parliamentary Friendship Group.

== Political positions ==
In the Republicans’ 2016 presidential primaries, Furst endorsed Jean-François Copé as the party’s candidate for the office of President of France. In the Republicans’ 2017 leadership election, he endorsed Laurent Wauquiez.
