= Erich Isselhorst =

German Schutzstaffel member (1906–1948)

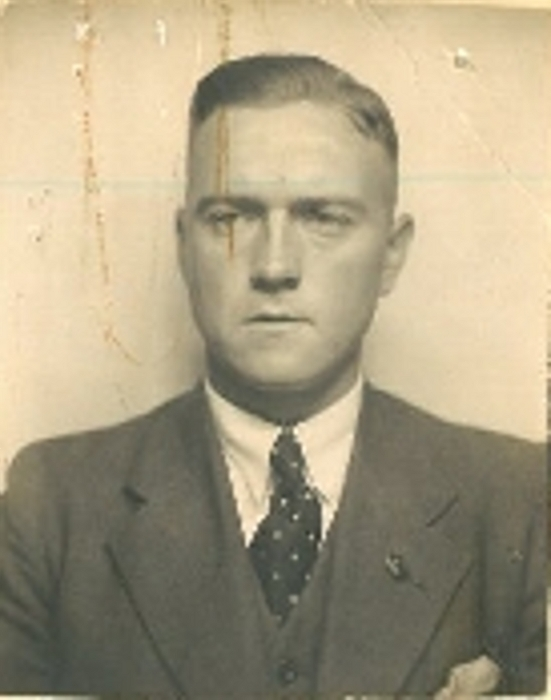
- Isselhorst, c. 1930s
- Born: Erich Georg Heinrich Isselhorst; 5 February 1906; Saint-Avold, German Empire
- Died: 23 February 1948 (aged 42); Strasbourg, France
- Cause of death: Execution by firing squad
- Military career
- Allegiance: Nazi Germany
- Branch: Schutzstaffel
- Service years: 1934–1945
- Service number: Nazi Party #1,269,847; SS #267,313
- Commands: Einsatzkommandos 8 & 1 Kommandeur der Sicherheitspolizei und des SD, Minsk; Befehlshaber der Sicherheitspolizei und des SD, Alsace; Inspekteur der Sicherheitspolizei und des SD, Wehrkreis V

Erich Isselhorst (5 February 1906 – 23 February 1948) was a member of the Schutzstaffel (SS) before and during World War II, attaining the rank of SS-Standartenführer.

Between 1942 and 1943, during the German invasion of the Soviet Union, Isselhorst was an Einsatzkommando leader, tasked with the murdering of Jews in what is now Belarus and the Baltic states. Before and after, Isselhorst held posts within the Gestapo and SS in Cologne, Munich, Stuttgart and Strasbourg. In 1944, he participated in the Stalag Luft III murders.

After the war, he was tried and convicted for war crimes. He was sentenced to death by both British and French military courts and executed in France in 1948 for ordering the execution of captured British Special Air Service (SAS) members and French civilians in 1944.

== Biography ==
=== Early life ===
Erich Georg Heinrich Isselhorst was born in Saint-Avold, Lorraine, in 1906, which was then part of the German Empire but is now part of France. He was educated in Dortmund, Recklinghausen and Düsseldorf, where he graduated in 1925. He was employed in a rubber factory before studying law from 1927 to 1930 in Cologne and Munich. Isselhorst received his Doctor of Laws degree in 1931, once more returned to Düsseldorf, and joined the Nazi Party in August 1932.

=== SS career ===
Isselhorst joined the Sturmabteilung (SA), in May 1933, and the Schutzstaffel (SS) in October 1934. He was admitted to the Sicherheitsdienst (SD) in July 1937 and permanently employed in the Gestapo in Berlin from December 1935 forward. From February 1936 to April 1938, he was head of the Gestapo in Cologne, after which he was transferred to Klagenfurt in Austria, which had recently been annexed by Nazi Germany. During this time, he also served as a reservist in the Wehrmacht, taking part in training with an anti-aircraft regiment.

From December 1939 to November 1942, Isselhorst served as the head of the Gestapo in Munich. In January 1942 he was severely reprimanded for behaviour unbecoming of a member of the SS.

From January to October 1942, Isselhorst was transferred to the Reichskommissariat Ostland in occupied Belarus, where he headed a department of the Sicherheitspolizei (SiPo; Security Police). In September and October 1942, he led Einsatzkommando 8, a sub-group of the mobile killing unit known as Einsatzgruppe B, which was tasked with murdering Jews. From October 1942 to June 1943, he led Einsatzkommando 1 of the Einsatzgruppe A, now in the Baltic States, carrying out the murder of Jews there. From June to October 1943, he was the Kommandeur der Sicherheitspolizei und des SD in Minsk while also leading Sonderkommandos 1b of the Einsatzgruppe A.

Isselhorst returned to Germany in October 1943 and his old role in Munich before being transferred to Strasbourg in December, where he was appointed as the Befehlshaber der Sicherheitspolizei und des SD (Commander of SiPo and SD) of Alsace. At the same time, he also headed the SiPo and SD as Inspekteur der Sicherheitspolizei und des SD in the neighboring Wehrkreis V with headquarters in Stuttgart. In October 1944, he was promoted to Oberst of police and, on 9 November, to SS-Standartenführer.

=== Murder of captured SAS soldiers ===
While posted in Strasbourg in the second half of 1944, Isselhorst was part of the Operation Waldfest, a scorched earth operation in which villages in the Vosges mountains were destroyed to eliminate shelter for Allied troops for the upcoming winter, with the inhabitants deported as forced labour or to Nazi concentration camps. In a coordinated operation by the Wehrmacht and SS, villages were raided. There Maquis French resistance fighters, and 39 British paratroopers of the Special Air Service (SAS), part of the Operation Loyton, were executed; the latter as part of Hitler's Commando Order.

Isselhorst ordered the execution of the captured British SAS members, as well as a number of French civilians, three French priests and four US airmen. The prisoners were taken over the Rhine river on trucks to Gaggenau on 21 November 1944. The leader of the execution commando, Karl Buck (reported as Karl Buck in "The Nazi Hunters", Damien Lewis, 2015), thought it unwise to leave mass graves of shot allied soldiers in an area so close to the front line. The prisoners were initially kept in a local jail but on or shortly after 25 November, they were taken to a local forest and shot in the head in a bomb crater. One prisoner attempted to escape, but was killed. Apart from Isselhorst, his second in command, Wilhelm Schneider was also executed for the war crime in January 1947. Buck was sentenced to death, but was reprieved and released in 1954.

In January 1945, Isselhorst was transferred to the Reich Security Main Office (RSHA) in Berlin, where he remained until April. Isselhorst was arrested by US forces on 12 May 1945 in southern Bavaria.

=== Execution ===
Isselhorst was sentenced to death by a British military court in June 1946 for the murder of British POWs, but handed over to the French. He was sentenced to death in May 1947 by a French military tribunal, and executed in Strasbourg on 23 February 1948.
