= Battle of the Vosges (1944) =

1944 WWII battle in France

Battle of the Vosges and Alsace
- Part of the Western Front of World War II
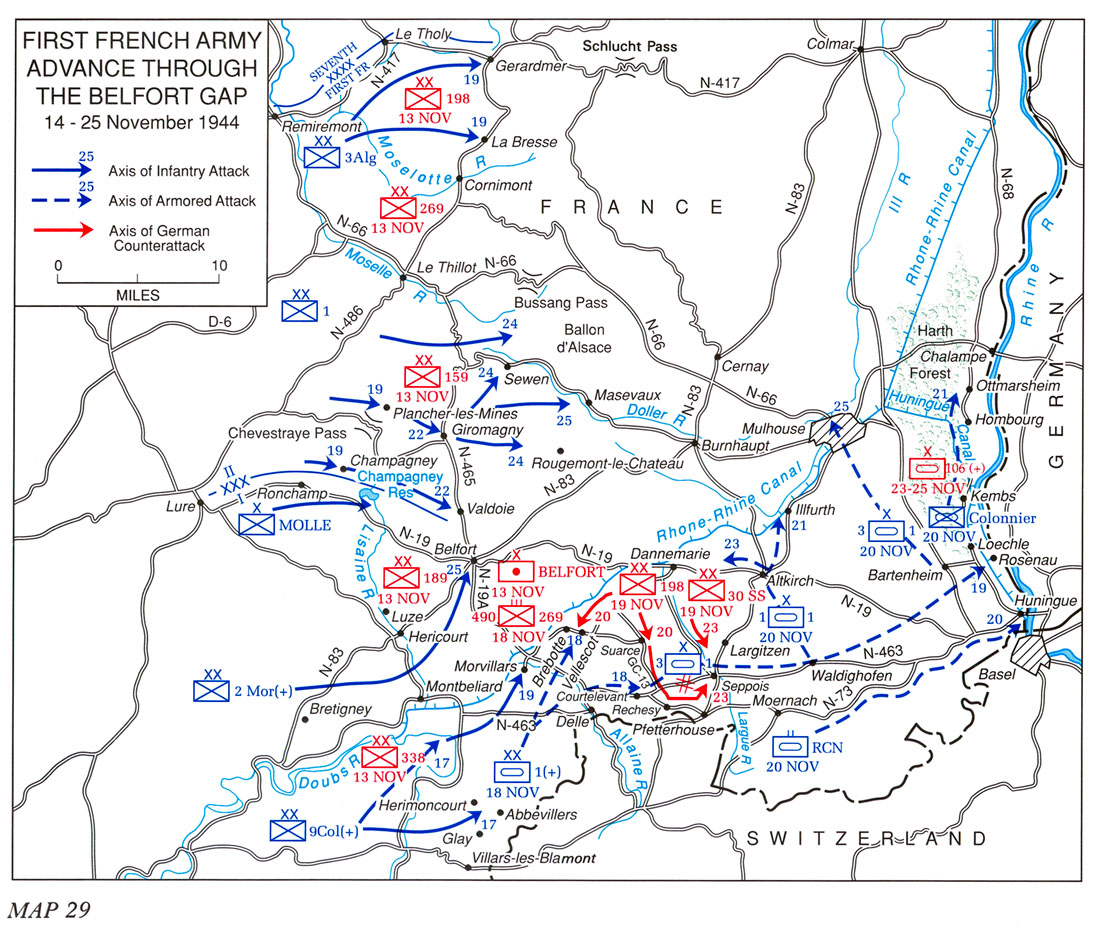
- French troops advancing near Belfort, 1944
Date	September 15, 1944 – February 15, 1945
Location	Vosges Mountains, France
Result	Allied victory

Belligerents
Free France; United States	Germany

Commanders and leaders
(Free France) Philippe Leclerc (Free France) Jean de Lattre de Tassigny (United States) Alexander Patch	(Nazi Germany) Friedrich Wiese

Units involved
2nd Moroccan Infantry Division; 1st Free French Division; 9th Colonial Infantry Division; 3rd Algerian Infantry Division; 442nd Regimental Combat Team	19th Army; 5th Panzer Army

Casualties and losses
Unknown	Unknown

The Battle of the Vosges and Alsace was a series of battles fought from September 15, 1944, to February 15, 1945, in the Vosges Mountains and the Alsace region during World War II. The engagements involved Free French and American forces advancing against German defenses established in the mountainous region.

== Background ==
The battle followed the successful Normandy and Provence landings. The American 3rd Army under General George S. Patton advanced from the north, while French forces led by General Jean de Lattre de Tassigny pushed from the south. Their junction occurred on September 12, 1944, at Montbard, under the command of SHAEF and General Dwight D. Eisenhower.

== Combat Operations ==
German forces, including the 19th Army under General Friedrich Wiese, regrouped in the Vosges Mountains, using the Route des Crêtes and other natural defenses to slow the Allied advance.

French and American units faced fierce resistance, harsh terrain, and coordination difficulties. Notable units included the French 3rd Algerian Infantry Division (3e DIA), the 2nd Armored Division (2e DB), and the U.S. 442nd Regimental Combat Team, made up largely of Japanese-American soldiers (nisei).

== Notable Engagements ==
- Battle of Bruyères (October 1944), where the 442nd RCT rescued the Lost Battalion (World War II).
- Assault on the Haut du Faing with mule trains transporting wounded and ammunition across snow-covered slopes.

== Difficulties ==
The campaign was marked by:

- Harsh winter weather
- Difficult terrain and dense forests
- Logistical problems (equipment, clothing, and food)
- Political and structural reorganization of French forces, including unit "whitening" (replacement of colonial troops with metropolitan ones)

== Aftermath ==
The German defensive line was eventually broken, allowing the Allies to push toward Strasbourg, which was liberated on November 23, 1944. The battle demonstrated the critical role of both colonial troops and Japanese-American soldiers in the liberation of France.

== See also ==
- Battle of Dompaire
- Battle of Bruyères
- Lost Battalion (World War II)
- Operation Loyton
- Operation Waldfest
- Battle of Alsace
- Haut du Faing
