= Louise Morel =

French politician

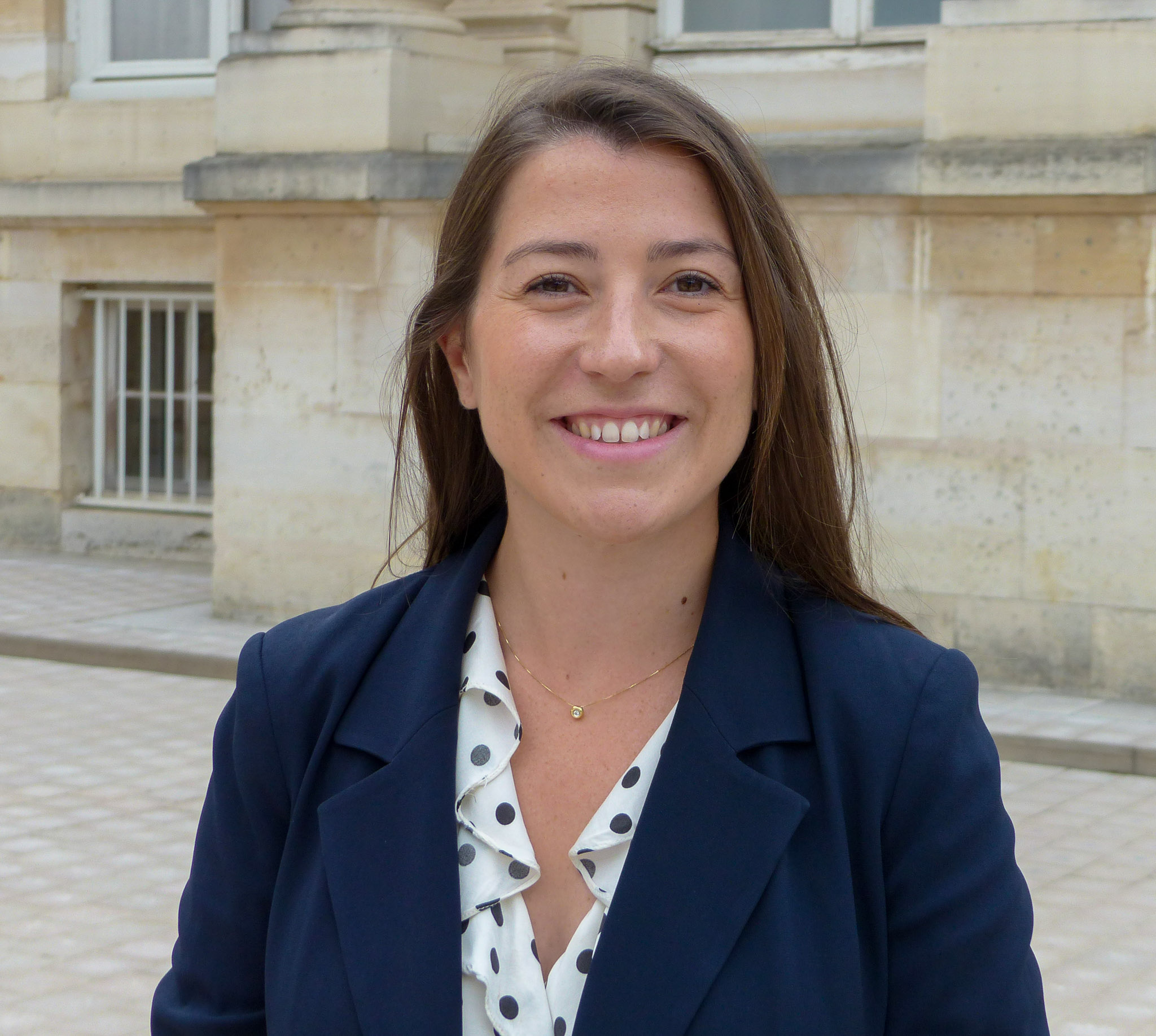
Morel in 2024

Louise Morel (born 15 October 1995) is a French politician. A member of Democratic Movement, Morel was elected a Member of the National Assembly for the Bas-Rhin's sixth constituency in the 2022 French legislative election.

== Biography ==
Louise Morel was born on October 15, 1995, in Strasbourg. Morel is the daughter of Alice Morel, mayor of Bellefosse since 1977 and who served as a general councilor for Saales canton from 2004 to 2015.

Morel studied one year at lycée Henri Meck in Molsheim before transferring to lycée Sturm in Strasbourg.

Following high school, Morel studied at the Institut d'études politiques de Strasbourg and the ESSEC Business School.

During her time in university, Morel studied abroad in Australia and Singapore, and worked as an intern for the Ministry of Armed Forces within the French embassy in Keyna.

Morel worked for a consulting firm in Paris focused on the Agrifood industry.

== Political career ==
In 2017, following the election of Emmanuel Macron, Louise Morel joined the Young Democrats of MoDem, where she became the organization's spokesperson.

Morel ran as a substitute candidate for Guy Salomon (MoDem) during the 2017 French legislative election, who lost in the second round to Laurent Furst.

During the 2017-2022 parliamentary session, Morel served as an intern within the office of Thierry Michels.

During the 2022 French legislative elections, Morel ran in Bas-Rhin's sixth constituency with Xavier Muller, an independent winemaker from Marlenheim, as her substitute. Manon Hirtz quit her position in the President's press office to become director of her campaign. On June 19, 2022, Morel was elected to the National Assembly in the second round, beating Jean-Frédéric Steinbach of Rassemblement national with 57.90% of the vote.

In the National Assembly, Morel is a member of the Economic Affairs committee, and the European Affairs committee, where she was elected secretary on July 7, 2022.
