= Arboretum du Col du Las =

Arboretum and nature trail in Grand Est, France

Coordinates: 48.34°N 7.052°E

The Arboretum du Col du Las is a municipal arboretum and nature trail located in La Grande-Fosse, Vosges, Grand Est, France. The arboretum contains about 100 regional trees and shrubs planted along a botanical trail with landscape views of the Massif du Donon. It is open daily without charge.

== See also ==
- List of botanical gardens in France
