= Bas-Rhin's 6th constituency =

Constituency of the National Assembly of France

6th constituency of Bas-Rhin
- inline Constituency of the National Assembly of France

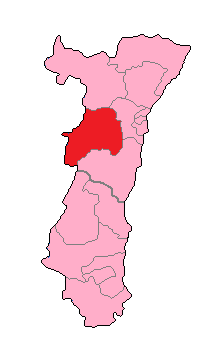
- Bas-Rhin's 6th Constituency shown within Alsace

- Bas-Rhin in France
- Deputy: Louise Morel; MoDem
- Department: Bas-Rhin
- Cantons: Saales, Obernai, Molsheim, Rosheim, Schirmeck, Wasselonne
- Registered voters: 91,200

The 6th constituency of the Bas-Rhin is a French legislative constituency in the Bas-Rhin département.

== Description ==
The 6th Constituency of Bas-Rhin covers the mid Western portion of the Département including the entire Arrondissement of Molsheim but also Obernai from the Arrondissement of Sélestat-Erstein.

The constituency includes the small towns of Molsheim and Wasselonne as well as a portion of the eastern fringes of the Vosges Mountains.

The constituency had been held by parties of the right and centre right for its entire existence during the 5th Republic until 2022, when it was gained by the centrist MoDem party.

== Historic representation ==
Election	Member	Party
1958	Henri Meck	MRP
1962	Henri Meck	CD
1967	Gérard Lehn	UDR
1968	Gérard Lehn	UDR
1973	Jean-Marie Caro	UDF
1978	Jean-Marie Caro	UDF
1981	Jean-Marie Caro	UDF
1986	Proportional representation – no election by constituency	
1988	Jean-Marie Caro	UDF
1993	Alain Ferry	PR
1997	Alain Ferry	PR
2002	Alain Ferry	PR
2007	Alain Ferry	PR
2012	Laurent Furst	UMP
2017	Laurent Furst	LR
2020	Philippe Meyer	LR
2022	Louise Morel	MoDem

== Election results ==
=== 2024 ===
Legislative Election 2024: Bas-Rhin's 6th constituency
Party	Candidate	Votes	%	±%
DLF	Patricia Marle	634	0.97	N/A
DIV	Ryan Geyer	79	0.12	N/A
LÉ–EELV (NFP)	Didier Andres	10,076	15.35	−1.26
LR	Jean Biehler	8,739	13.31	−7.10
LO	René Camus	362	0.55	N/A
MoDem (Ensemble)	Louise Morel	18,228	27.76	+2.41
RN	Vincent Coussedière	25,275	38.50	+15.85
REC	Sabrina Ritter	494	0.75	−2.18
UL	Carine Hamm	1,770	2.70	−2.90
Turnout		65,657	98.09	+51.85
Registered electors		98,222		
2nd round result
MoDem	Louise Morel	35,890	55.02	−2.88
RN	Vincent Coussedière	29,338	44.98	+2.88
Turnout		65,228	96.13	+52.51
Registered electors		99,281		
MoDem hold		Swing		

=== 2022 ===
Legislative Election 2022: Bas-Rhin's 6th constituency
Party	Candidate	Votes	%	±%
MoDem (Ensemble)	Louise Morel	11,267	25.35	-4.13
RN	Jean-Frédéric Steinbach	10,065	22.65	+8.85
LR (UDC)	Philippe Meyer	9,069	20.41	−15.80
EELV (NUPÉS)	Martine Marchal-Minazzi	7,380	16.61	+5.12
UL (REG)	Carine Hamm	2,488	5.60	+0.44
REC	Sabrina Ritter	1,300	2.93	N/A
DVE	Véronique Grussi	1,272	2.86	N/A
Others	N/A	1,597	-	−
Turnout		44,438	46.24	−2.82
2nd round result
MoDem (Ensemble)	Louise Morel	23,080	57.90	+20.50
RN	Jean-Frédéric Steinbach	16,785	42.10	N/A
Turnout		39,865	43.62	+4.54
MoDem gain from LR				

=== 2017 ===
Results of the 11 June and 18 June 2017 French National Assembly election in Bas-Rhin’s 6th Constituency
Candidate	Party		1st round		2nd round	
Candidate	Party		Votes	%	Votes	%
Laurent Furst	The Republicans	LR	16,824	36.21	24,843	62.60
Guy Salomon	Democratic Movement	MoDem	13,965	29.48	14,845	37.40
Hombeline Du Parc	National Front	FN	6,410	13.80		
Denis Gadot	La France Insoumise	FI	2,669	5.74		
Jeanine Plaisant-Hermanns	Regionalist	REG	2,395	5.16		
Alexandre Gonçalves	Ecologist	ECO	1,860	4.00		
Martin Effenberger	Socialist Party	PS	644	1.39		
Sara Chabaane	Debout la France	DLF	561	1.21		
Régis Meyer	Independent	DIV	408	0.88		
Gilles Pfaffenhof	Independent	DIV	277	0.60		
Evelyne Monteleone	Independent	DIV	233	0.50		
Roxane Ferrez	Far Left	EXG	202	0.43		
Odile Agrafeil	Communist Party	PCF	167	0.36		
Olivier Laustriat	Independent	DIV	114	0.25		
Total			46,459	100%	39,688	100%
Registered voters			96,039		96,028	
Blank/Void ballots			661	1.40%	1,298	5.25%
Turnout			47,120	49.06%	41,886	43.62%
Abstentions			48,919	50.94%	54,142	56.38%
Result					LR GAIN FROM UMP	

=== 2012 ===
Laurent Furst was elected with more than 50% of the vote in the first round of voting, and therefore no second round took place.

Results of the 10 June and 17 June 2012 French National Assembly election in Bas-Rhin’s 6th Constituency
Candidate	Party		1st round	
Candidate	Party		Votes	%
Laurent Furst	Union for a Popular Movement	UMP	25,964	51.68
Brigitte Tinot	National Front	FN	8,953	17.82
Astrid Scharly	Socialist Party	PS	8,043	16.01
Jean Vogel	Europe Ecology - The Greens	EELV	4,720	9.39
Dorothée Unterberger	Left Front	FG	969	1.93
Anne-Sophie Freliger	The Centre for France	CEN	945	1.88
Rémy Wendling	Other	AUT	416	0.83
Jeanne-Françoise Langlade	Far Left	EXG	232	0.46
Total			50.242	100%
Registered voters			91,200	
Blank/Void ballots			707	1.39%
Turnout			50,949	55.87%
Abstentions			40,251	44.13%
Result			UMP HOLD	

=== 2007 ===
Alain Ferry was elected with more than 50% of the vote in the first round of voting, and therefore no second round took place.

Results of the 10 June and 17 June 2007 French National Assembly election in Bas-Rhin’s 6th Constituency
Candidate	Party		1st round	
Candidate	Party		Votes	%
Alain Ferry	Union for a Popular Movement	UMP	31,097	67.38
Cédric Baillet	UDF-Democratic Movement	UDF-MoDem	4,293	9.30
Marie-Madeleine Iantzen	Socialist Party	PS	3,883	8.41
Nathalie Tomasi	National Front	FN	2,444	5.30
Mireille Metz	The Greens	LV	1,708	3.70
Valérie Acker	Far Left	EXG	717	1.55
Marie-Noëlle Eastes	Ecologist	ECO	489	1.06
Joël Allain	Communist Party	PCF	410	0.89
Bernadette Lutz	Independent	DIV	407	0.88
Jean Meyer	Far Left	EXG	386	0.84
Marie Jeanne Mailley	Far Right	EXD	319	0.69
Total			46,153	100%
Registered voters			80,815	
Blank/Void ballots			776	1.65%
Turnout			46,929	58.07%
Abstentions			33,886	41.93%
Result			UMP HOLD	

=== 2002 ===
Alain Ferry was elected under the Union for a Presidential Majority candidate but was a member of the Radical Party. Furthermore, he was elected with more than 50% of the vote in the first round of voting, and therefore no second round took place.

Results of the 9 June and 16 June 2002 French National Assembly election in Bas-Rhin’s 6th Constituency
Candidate	Party		1st round	
Candidate	Party		Votes	%
Alain Ferry	Union for a Presidential Majority	UMP	27,318	60.63
Nathalie Tomasi	National Front	FN	6,541	14.52
Michele Zumstein	Socialist Party	PS	5,836	12.95
Mireille Metz	The Greens	LV	1,553	3.45
Daniel Schilling	National Republican Movement	MNR	1,221	2.71
Bernard Goepfert	Ecologist	ECO	693	1.54
Jean Meyer	Workers’ Struggle	LO	513	1.14
J. Paul Fabacher	Communist Party	PCF	455	1.01
Gilles Dimnet	Revolutionary Communist League	LCR	384	0.85
Irene Eckmann	Republican Pole	PR	350	0.78
Pascale Petermann	Independent	DIV	190	0.42
Total			45,054	100%
Registered voters			75,374	
Blank/Void ballots			1,115	2.42%
Turnout			46,169	61.25%
Abstentions			29,205	38.75%
Result			PR HOLD	
