= La Grande-Fosse =

- Commune
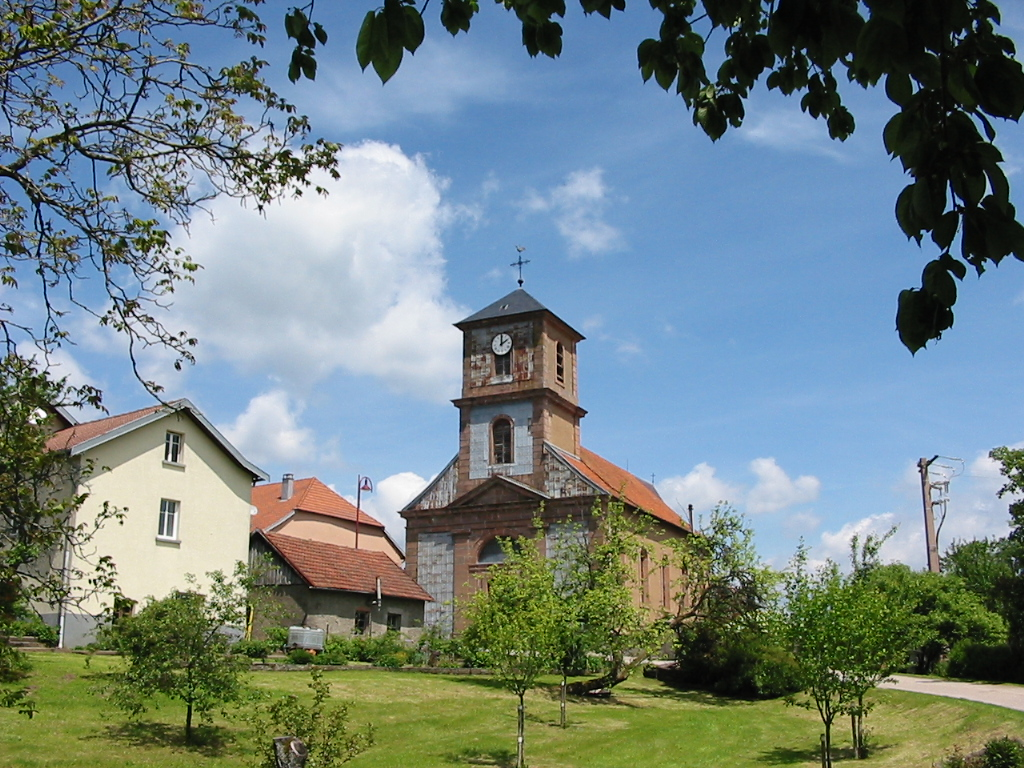
- The church of Saint Gondelbert in La Grande-Fosse
- Location of La Grande-Fosse
- Location within France Location within Grand Est
- Coordinates: 48°20′23″N 7°04′13″E
- Country: France
- Region: Grand Est
- Department: Vosges
- Arrondissement: Saint-Dié-des-Vosges
- Canton: Saint-Dié-des-Vosges-2
- Intercommunality: CA Saint-Dié-des-Vosges

Government
  - Mayor (2020–2026): Alain Haass
- Area^{1}: 6.79 km^{2} (2.62 sq mi)
- Elevation: 630 m (2,070 ft)
- Highest elevation: 820 m (2,690 ft)
- Lowest elevation: 449 m (1,473 ft)
- Population (2023): 126
  - Density: 18.6/km^{2} (48.1/sq mi)
- Time zone: UTC+01:00 (CET)
  - Summer (DST): UTC+02:00 (CEST)
- INSEE/Postal code: 88213 /88490
- ^{1} French Land Register data, which excludes lakes, ponds, glaciers > 1 km^{2} (0.386 sq mi or 247 acres) and river estuaries.

La Grande-Fosse (French pronunciation: [la ɡʁɑ̃d fos]) is a commune in the Vosges department in Grand Est in northeastern France.

== Points of interest ==
- Arboretum du Col du Las
- Memorial associated with Operation Loyton in 1944

== See also ==
- Communes of the Vosges department
