= Lost legions =

Several of the Roman legions have become known as "lost legions":

- Legion XVII(17th), XVIII(18th) and XIX(19th), defeated in the Battle of the Teutoburg Forest in 9 AD
- Legion IX(9th) Hispana, disappeared from surviving reports in Britannia 108 AD and Germania Inferior around 130 AD

== See also ==
- Lost battalion (disambiguation)
