= Lost Battalion =

Lost Battalion may refer to:

- Lost Battalion (World War I), American units which were isolated by Germans in 1918
- Lost Battalion (Europe, World War II), an American battalion which was surrounded by Germans in 1944
- Lost Battalion (Pacific, World War II), an American battalion and survivors from a ship's crew taken prisoner early in the Pacific War
- Lost Battalion (China), the Chinese Lost Battalion during the Defense of Sihang Warehouse in 1937
- The Lost Battalion (1919 film), a 1919 film about the World War I event
- Lost Battalion (1960 film) a 1960 Filipino World War II film
- The Lost Battalion (2001 film), a remake of the 1919 film

== See also ==
- Lost legions (disambiguation)
