= Alsace-Moselle Memorial =

Regional history museum in Schirmeck, Alsace, France

Coordinates: 48.4871°N 7.2218°E

The Alsace-Moselle Memorial is a museum dedicated to World War II in the Alsace-Moselle region, which was annexed by Germany. The Memorial, which was inaugurated on 18 June 2005, is located in Schirmeck in Alsace, near the former Natzweiler-Struthof concentration camp, opened by the Nazis in August 1940 at the beginning of the annexation.

== History ==
The Memorial follows the history of Alsace and Moselle, from 1870 to the present day, focusing on the annexations by Germany.

The construction of a historical interpretive centre recounting the specific experiences of Alsace and Moselle had its genesis in a proposal by Jean-Pierre Masseret, Secretary of State for Veterans and Victims of War, which was supported by regional politicians. In 1999, Philippe Richert and Masseret took the decision to build the Alsace-Moselle Memorial in Schirmeck.

The memorial is managed since January 2000, by a joint union. It is funded by the General Councils of Bas-Rhin and Haut-Rhin, the town council of Schirmeck and the Haute Bruche union of local authorities. For investment, the European Union, the Lorraine region and the Moselle department also participated. Alain Ferry, MP for the Bas-Rhin Department has been president of the managing body from the beginning. On September 16, 2000, Jean-Louis English (1939-2003), then director of France 3 Alsace, created the Association of Friends of the Alsace-Moselle Memorial (AMAM).

The Memorial was inaugurated on 18 June 2005. A 240 m2 extension for a “memory space” should see the light of day around 2023. It will pay tribute to the 42,000 dead and missing from Alsace and Moselle during the World War II.
