= Alain Ferry (politician) =

French politician

Alain Ferry (born 3 February 1952) is a French politician. A member of the Radical Party, he represented the 6th constituency of the Bas-Rhin in the National Assembly for over 19 years, from 2 April 1993 to 19 June 2012. He has been the mayor of Wisches in the Bas-Rhin since 1989 and was a member of the General Council of the département from 1992 to 2004.

He is the founding President of the Alsace-Moselle Memorial museum.
