= Wisches =

- Commune
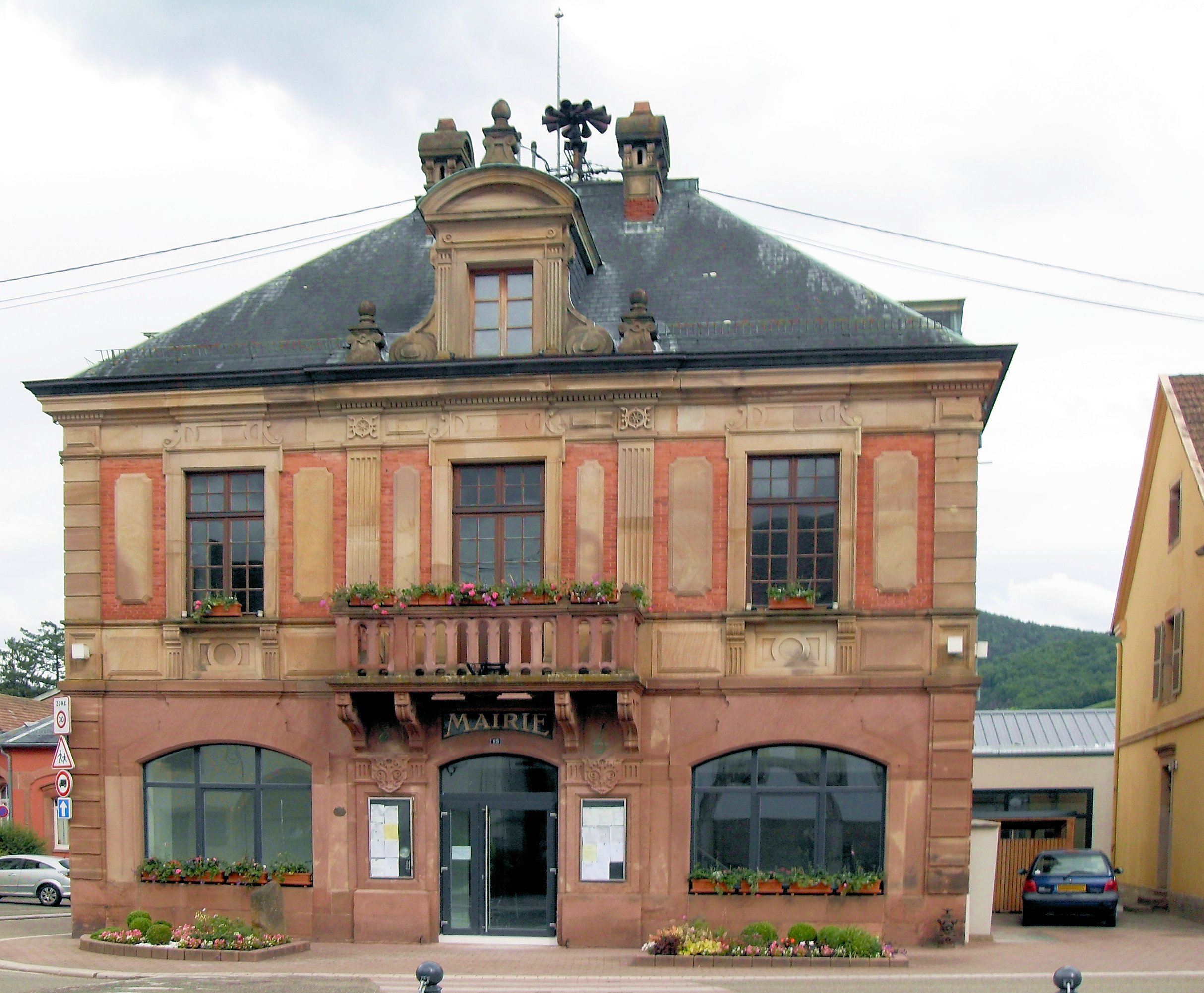
- The town hall in Wisches

- Coat of arms
- Location of Wisches
- Location within France Location within Grand Est
- Coordinates: 48°30′34″N 7°16′10″E
- Country: France
- Region: Grand Est
- Department: Bas-Rhin
- Arrondissement: Molsheim
- Canton: Mutzig
- Intercommunality: Vallée de la Bruche

Government
  - Mayor (2020–2026): Alain Ferry
- Area^{1}: 19.25 km^{2} (7.43 sq mi)
- Highest elevation: 960 m (3,150 ft)
- Lowest elevation: 262 m (860 ft)
- Population (2023): 2,050
  - Density: 106/km^{2} (276/sq mi)
- Time zone: UTC+01:00 (CET)
  - Summer (DST): UTC+02:00 (CEST)
- INSEE/Postal code: 67543 /67130
- ^{1} French Land Register data, which excludes lakes, ponds, glaciers > 1 km^{2} (0.386 sq mi or 247 acres) and river estuaries.

Wisches (French pronunciation: [viʃ]; German: Wisch) is a commune in the Bas-Rhin department and Grand Est region of north-eastern France.

== Population ==
Historical population
Year	Pop.	±% p.a.
1968	1,794	—
1975	1,867	+0.57%
1982	1,719	−1.17%
1990	1,655	−0.47%
1999	2,017	+2.22%
2007	2,166	+0.89%
2012	2,145	−0.19%
2017	2,105	−0.38%
2023	2,050	−0.44%
Source: INSEE

== See also ==
- Communes of the Bas-Rhin department
