= Philippe Meyer (politician) =

French politician (born 1969)

Philippe Meyer (born 19 April 1969) is a French politician of the Republicans who served as a deputy of the National Assembly from 2020 to 2022, representing Bas-Rhin's 6th constituency.
