= Karl Buck =

SS officer and concentration camp commandant

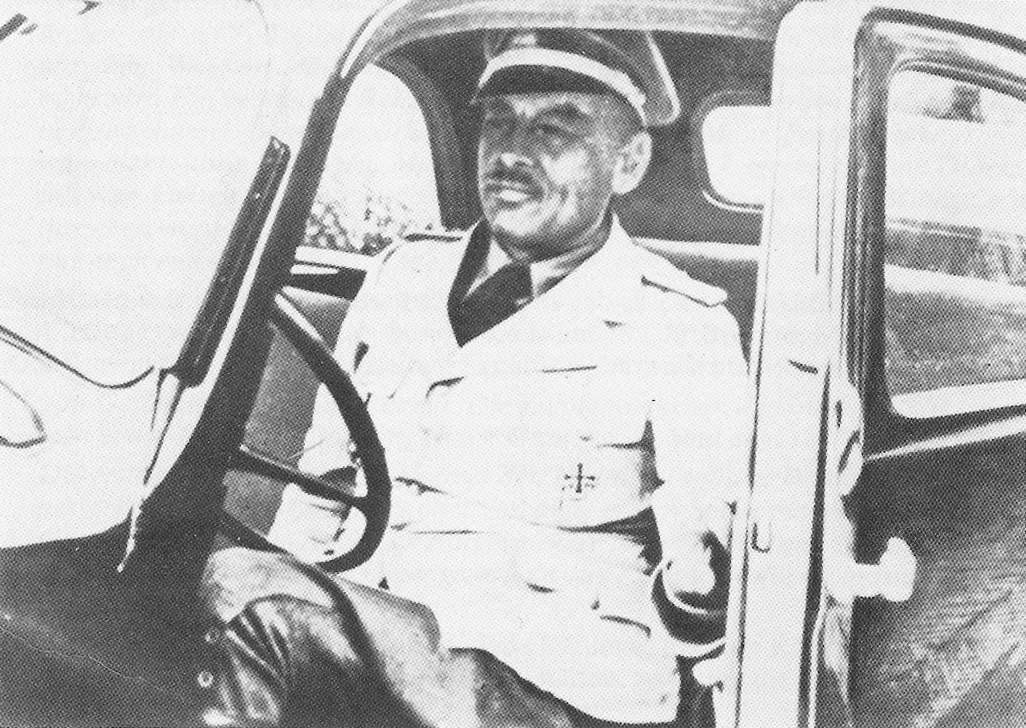
Karl Buck

Karl Gustav Wilhelm Buck (17 November 1894, Stuttgart – 11 June 1977, Rudersberg) was a German SS-Hauptsturmführer and Lagerkommandant. From 1933 until 1940 Buck was the commander of the concentration camp Heuberg, Oberer Kuhberg and Lager Welzheim, from 1940 of the Sicherungslager Schirmeck-Vorbruck in Alsace.

== Life until 1933 ==
Buck worked as a mechanic in Esslingen until 1910. After his formation he entered the military and began an Officer's career. In the first World War he was at the Russian, Serbian, Italian and the Western fronts. 1917 he became a lieutenant. For his efforts during war he was awarded the Iron Cross of first class.

1919 he began to study engineering in Esslingen. In 1920 he got the post of an engineer in a cement factory. He married the same year and shortly afterwards, had one daughter. 1921 and 1924-1930 he was working abroad in Portugal and Chile. He lost his left leg in a work accident in Chile, afterwards he returned to Germany.

After his accident he was jobless. In March 1931 he became a member of the NSDAP (No. 759.070) and became member of the SA.

He joined the Gestapo and changed from the SA to the SS where he was enlisted as number 490,187.

== Commander ==
From April to November 1933 he was the commander of the Heuberg camp until its closure in November 1933. He was responsible for the opening of the Oberer Kuhberg concentration camp. The work detail was done by inmates from Heuberg. He became the commander of Oberer Kuhberg until its closure in July 1935. Afterwards he became the commander of the Lager Welzheim when he was ordered to become the commander of the Sicherungslager Schirmeck-Vorbruck (at Schirmeck) in Alsace. He held this function until the end of the Nazi period in Germany. Shortly before its end, on 20 July 1944, he was promoted to SS-Hauptsturmführer.

== After the war ==
After the end of the war he was arrested in 1945. He was condemned twice to death by the French, and once by the British for murder and in the Lager Schirmeck (see Operation Loyton). Later, his death sentence was commuted to a life sentence.

In 1955 he was released and handed to German authorities that opened seven accusations on him that were turned down as they had been judged by the Allies before.
