= Schirmeck =

- Commune
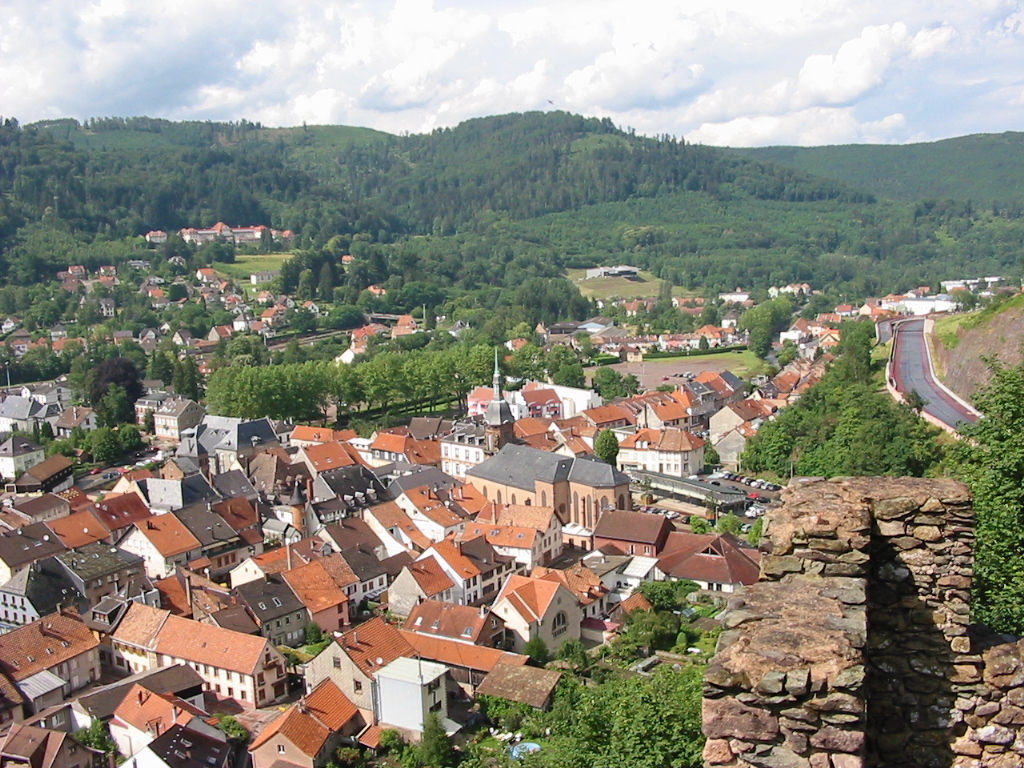
- View from the castle

- Coat of arms
- Location of Schirmeck
- Location within France Location within Grand Est
- Coordinates: 48°29′N 7°13′E
- Country: France
- Region: Grand Est
- Department: Bas-Rhin
- Arrondissement: Molsheim
- Canton: Mutzig

Government
  - Mayor (2026–32): Laurent Bertrand
- Area^{1}: 11.42 km^{2} (4.41 sq mi)
- Highest elevation: 823 m (2,700 ft)
- Lowest elevation: 289 m (948 ft)
- Population (2023): 2,056
  - Density: 180.0/km^{2} (466.3/sq mi)
- Time zone: UTC+01:00 (CET)
  - Summer (DST): UTC+02:00 (CEST)
- INSEE/Postal code: 67448 /67130
- Website: www.ville-schirmeck.fr
- ^{1} French Land Register data, which excludes lakes, ponds, glaciers > 1 km^{2} (0.386 sq mi or 247 acres) and river estuaries.

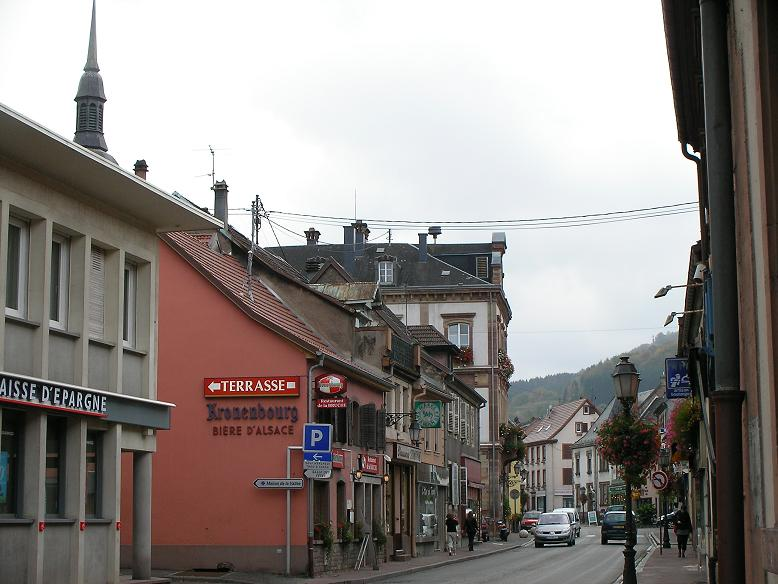
View west along the Grand-Rue

Schirmeck (French pronunciation: [ʃiʁmɛk]) is a commune in the Bas-Rhin department in Grand Est in north-eastern France. It is the location of the Alsace-Moselle Memorial museum. The name of the town means "protected place". In Lorraine dialect it is called "Chermec". The inhabitants are known as "Schirmeckois" in French.

== Geography ==
The town is situated on the banks of the Bruche, in the Vosges mountains. The commune extends over 1142 hectares from the Petit Donon to the Bruche, from the Grandfontaine stream to the Tommelsbach stream, taking in the Évêché hills, 832m high.

The area is mountainous and belongs to the Devonian Dinant primary rocks, made up of a series of schists and grauwackes in an irregular flow created at the bottom of a sea that was shaken by volcanic eruptions. Most of the territory is covered by forest, on steep slopes, but rich in mineral deposits, particularly iron and manganese.

The town is narrowly confined between the mountain side and the Bruche river, so a 610-metre road tunnel has been built in order to relieve traffic congestion. The bypass was opened on 28 January 2007.

== History ==
=== First mention ===
In 1315, the town was mentioned as Schirmecke in a founding charter of the collegial church of Haslach (Niederhaslach). It reappeared in the description of the boundaries of the lands of the abbey of Senones, under the name Neufville en Barembax; the name "new town" suggesting that it had recently been created. The town was hardly more than village, without any known privileges such as markets or freedoms. It was dependent on the See of Strasbourg but nevertheless occupied a strategic position on the Bruche, at the crossing of busy roads linking Alsace to Lorraine.

The German name Schirmeck (opido nostro Schirmeck) was only adopted in the acts of chancelry from 1348.

=== From the Middle Ages to the Renaissance ===
The lands on which the town grew up was a former possession of the Counts of Nordgau, acquired from the last of the line, Frederick of Leiningen (Linange) in 1239 by Berthold I of Teck, bishop of Strasbourg.

It was towards the end of the thirteenth century that it became a town, without having that status. The Bishop of Strasbourg Johann 1st of Dirpheim (1308-1328) surrounded it by walls that were still in place in 1666, and built a bishop's castle.

The castle and town controlled a strategic passageway between Alsace and the Duchy of Lorraine. A toll for crossing the Bruche was mentioned for the first time in 1350. By this time a municipal government structure was in place, headed by a Schultheiß, an officer representing the bishop. An equally important toll was set up on the pass between the Great and Small Donon. Through there several thousand heads of cattle passed in fifty years, according to a witness statement made by an inhabitant of Harbouey in 1579. Long-distance trade routes linking the animal markets of Frankfurt, Strasbourg and Nuremberg brought wine, fish, cereals, ironmongery, sheep, pigs, oxen and horses through the town.

== Population ==
Historical population
Year	Pop.	±% p.a.
1968	2,605	—
1975	2,628	+0.13%
1982	2,352	−1.57%
1990	2,167	−1.02%
1999	2,177	+0.05%
2007	2,453	+1.50%
2012	2,372	−0.67%
2017	2,183	−1.65%
2023	2,056	−0.99%
Source: INSEE

== See also ==
- Communes of the Bas-Rhin department
