= Lost Battalion (Europe, World War II) =

US Army 1st Battalion, 141st Infantry (36th Infantry Division)

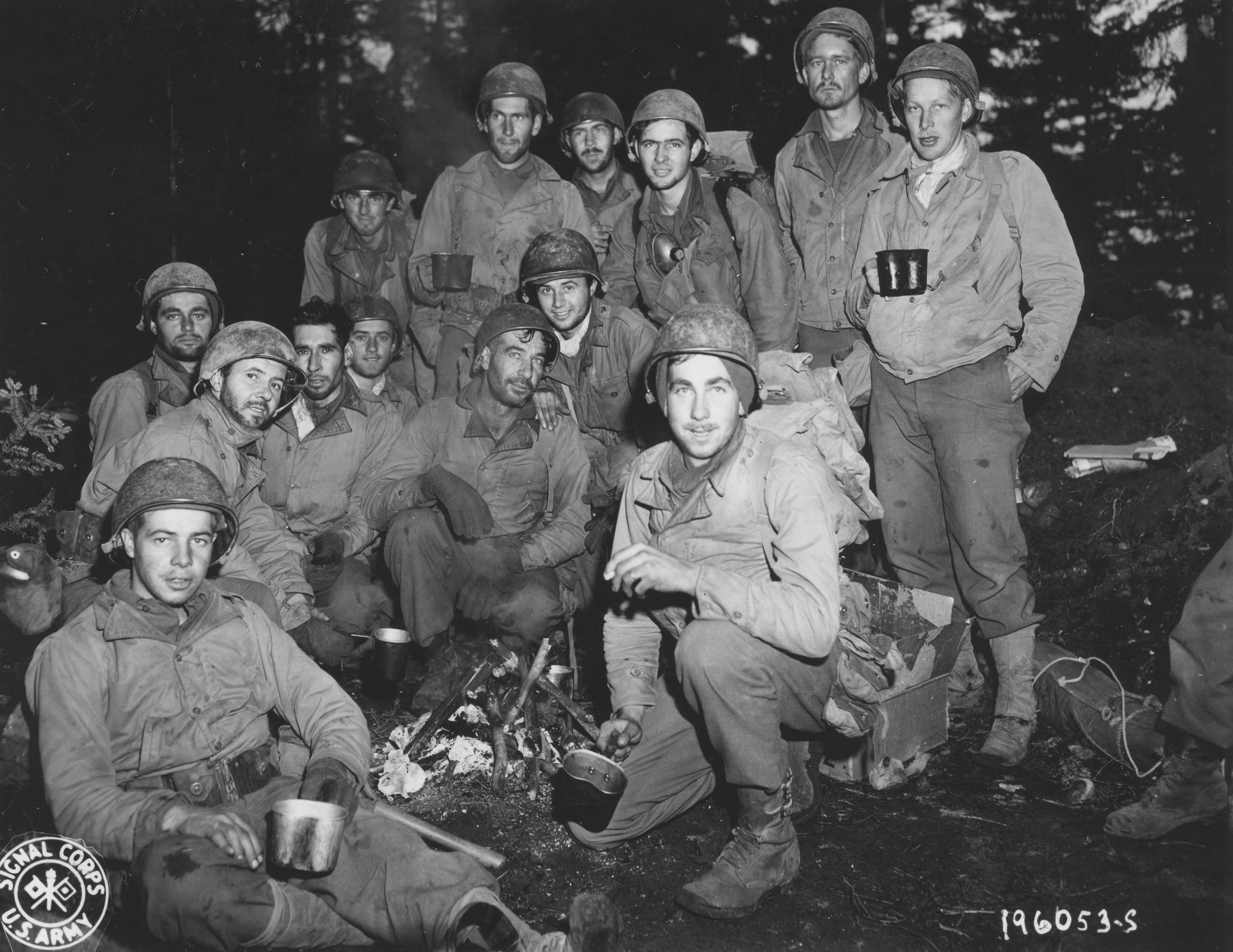
- Members of 1st Battalion after their rescue. (October 31, 1944)
Date	24–30 October 1944
Location	Vosges Mountains, France
Result	American victory

Belligerents
United States	Germany

Commanders and leaders
Maj. Gen. John Dahlquist (36th); Capt. Martin J. Higgins (141st); Col. Charles W. Pence (442nd)	Walter Rolin

Units involved
36th Infantry Division: 141st Infantry Regiment; 636th Tank Destroyer Battalion; 753rd Tank Battalion; 133rd Field Artillery Battalion; 442nd Infantry Regiment: 100th Infantry Battalion; 3rd Infantry Battalion; 522nd Artillery Battalion; 743rd Tank Battalion; 83rd Chemical Battalion 3rd Chemical Battalion	244th Infantry Division: 933rd Grenadier Regiment; 716th Infantry Division: 736th Grenadier Regiment; 202nd Mountain Battalion 198th Fusilier Battalion

Strength
141st Regiment; 275 soldiers 442nd Regiment; 2,943 soldiers	unknown

Casualties and losses
141st Regiment; 64 killed/wounded/missing and captured 442nd Regiment; 800 casualties	+1000 casualties

"The Lost Battalion" refers to the 1st Battalion, 141st Infantry, 36th Infantry Division, originally a Texas National Guard unit, which was surrounded by German forces in the Vosges Mountains on 24 October 1944 as part of the wider Battle of the Vosges.

== Battle ==
Against the advice of his senior officers, Major General John E. Dahlquist committed the 1st Battalion, 141st Infantry, to the engagement. The battalion was subsequently cut off by the Germans, and attempts by the 141st Infantry's other two battalions to extricate it failed. P-47 Thunderbolt fighters from the 405th Fighter Squadron, 371st Fighter Group, airdropped supplies to the 275 trapped soldiers, but conditions on the ground quickly deteriorated as the Germans continued to repel American ground forces' attempts to reach the trapped unit.

The final rescue attempt was made by the 442nd Regimental Combat Team, a segregated unit composed of Nisei (second-generation Japanese Americans). The 442nd had been given a period of rest after heavy fighting to liberate Bruyères and Biffontaine, but General Dahlquist called them back early to relieve the beleaguered 2nd and 3rd Battalions of the 141st Infantry. In five days of battle, from 26 to 30 October 1944, the 442nd broke through German defenses and rescued 211 men. The 442nd suffered over 800 casualties. Company I went in with 185 men; 8 came out unhurt. Company K engaged the enemy with 186 men; 169 were wounded or killed. Additionally, the 442nd's commander sent a patrol of 50–55 men to find a way to attack a German road block from the rear and try to liberate the remainder of the trapped men. Only five men returned to the "Lost Battalion" perimeter; 42 were taken prisoner and were sent to Stalag VII-A in Moosburg, Bavaria, where they remained until the POW camp was liberated on 29 April 1945.

The combined 100th/442nd is the most decorated unit in U.S. military history for its size and length of service, with the 100th Infantry Battalion earning the nickname "The Purple Heart Battalion" due to the number of its soldiers injured in combat.

== Legacy ==
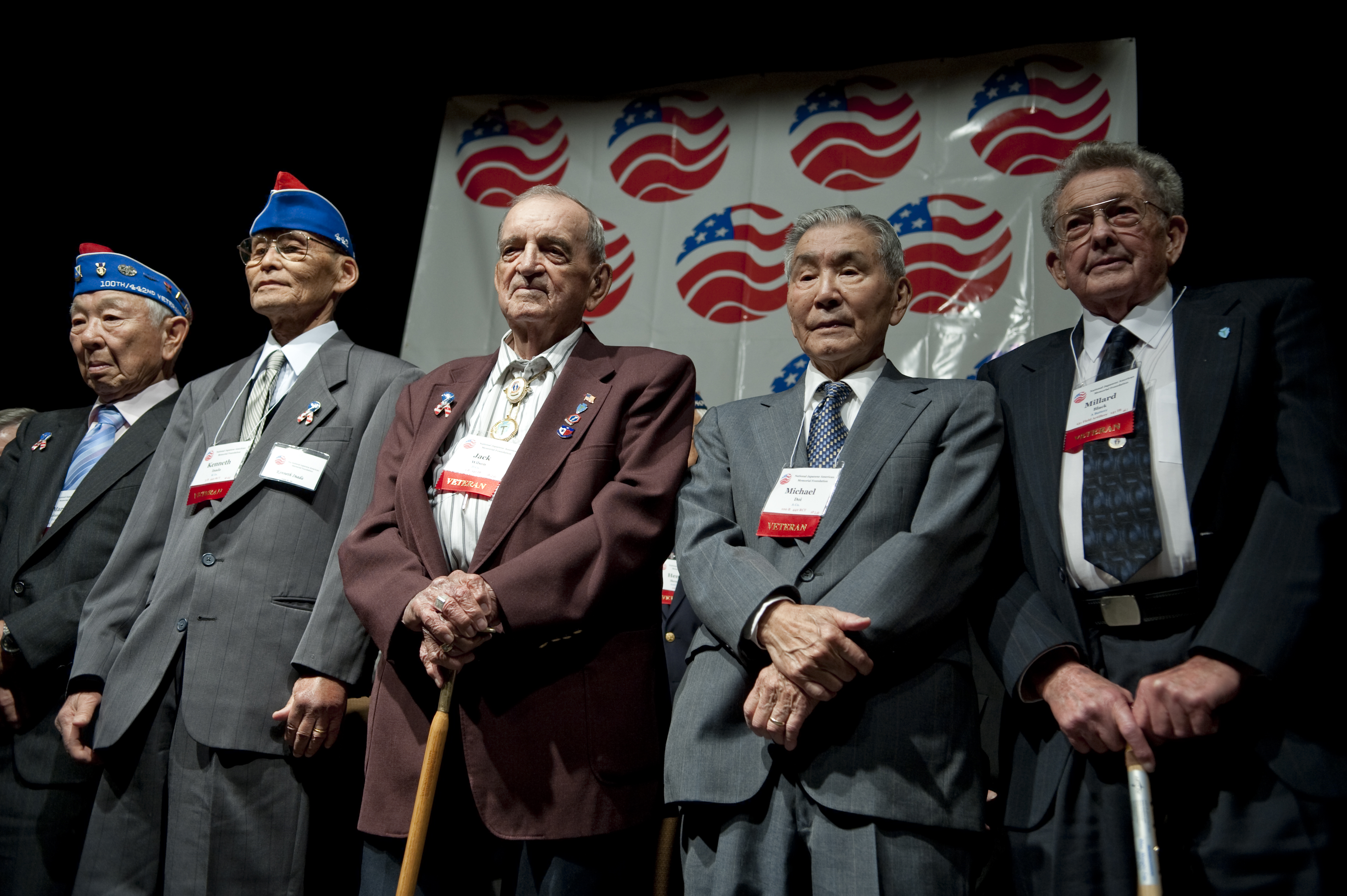
U.S. Army veterans from the 141st Infantry Regiment and the 442nd Regimental Combat Team stand during the 65th anniversary tribute dinner for the veterans of the Rescue of the Lost Battalion in Houston, Texas (November 2009).

In 1962, Texas Governor John Connally made the veterans of the 442nd "honorary Texans" for their role in the rescue of the Lost Battalion. Due to the discrimination of that era, three members of the 442nd decorated for valor for their participation in the rescue, Barney Hajiro, James Okubo, and George Sakato, were originally awarded lesser medals; in 2000, they were upgraded to the Medal of Honor, with Okubo, who died in 1967, receiving his medal posthumously. A special law was passed in 2010 awarding members of the unit, and those of the Military Intelligence Service, the Congressional Gold Medal, for which a ceremony was held at the Emancipation Hall of the U.S. Capitol in October 2011, followed by local ceremonies in California, Hawaii, and other states from which unit members had been unable to travel to Washington, D.C.

== See also ==
- 442nd Infantry Regiment (United States)
- Daniel Inouye
