= List of burials at Arlington National Cemetery =

Coordinates: 38.877°N 77.073°W

This is a list of notable individuals buried at Arlington National Cemetery in Arlington County, Virginia, United States.

== Military ==
=== Medal of Honor recipients ===
As of May 2026, there were over 400 Medal of Honor recipients buried in Arlington National Cemetery, nine of whom are Canadians.

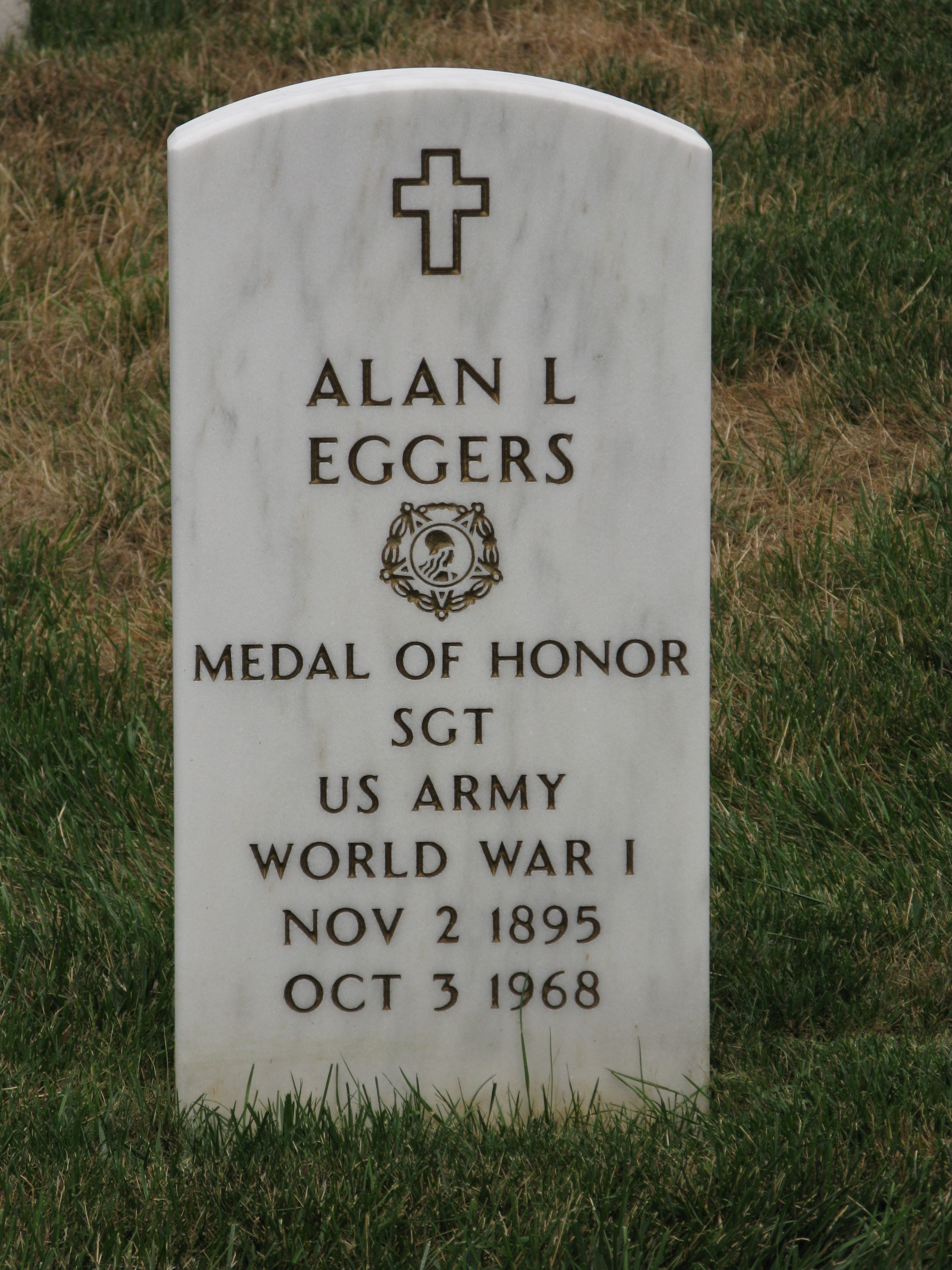
Alan Louis Eggers, Medal of Honor recipient for World War I

==== A ====
- George Emerson Albee (1845–1918), US Army officer; received for actions during the Indian Wars
- Beauford T. Anderson (1922–1996), US Army soldier during World War II

==== B ====
- Absalom Baird (1824–1905), US Army Brevet Major General, commanded a Division in the Army of the Cumberland; received for his actions at Battle of Jonesborough
- William E. Barber (1919–2002), US Marine Corps Colonel; received for his actions in the Battle of Chosin Reservoir during the Korean War
- John Basilone (1916–1945), US Marine Corps Gunnery Sergeant, killed at Iwo Jima; portrayed in the HBO mini-series The Pacific
- Randolph C. Berkeley (1875–1960), US Marine Corps Major General; received for his actions during the United States occupation of Veracruz
- Gregory "Pappy" Boyington (1912–1988), World War II US Marine Corps fighter ace and commander of VMF-214, the "Black Sheep Squadron" (basis for the 1970s TV series Baa Baa Black Sheep)
- John D. Bulkeley (1911–1996), US Navy Admiral, received for his actions in the Pacific Theater during WWII.

==== C ====
- James Alexander Campbell (1844–1904), US Army Private, Company A, 2nd New York Cavalry. Received during the Civil War while his command was retreating before superior numbers at Woodstock, Virginia, he voluntarily rushed back with one companion and rescued his commanding officer, who had been unhorsed and left behind. At Amelia courthouse he captured two battle flags.
- Bruce Crandall (1933-2026), US Army Officer; received medal of honor during his actions as a pilot.
- Albertus W. Catlin (1868–1933), US Marine Corps Brigadier General; received for his actions during the intervention at Veracruz, Mexico
- Jon R. Cavaiani (1943–2014), US Army Command Sergeant Major. Received for his actions while serving as platoon leader providing security for an isolated radio relay site located within enemy-held territory that came under attack. Prisoner of war during the Vietnam War (1971–1973)
- Justice M. Chambers (1908–1982), US Marine Corps officer; received for his actions in during the Battle of Iwo Jima
- Donald Cook (1934–1967) cenotaph, US Marine Corps officer. Received for his actions while a prisoner of war during the Vietnam War. His body was never recovered.
- Edwin Hyland Cooper (1881–1948), U.S. Signal Corps photographic officer in World War I, awarded two medals for bravery while covering the attack of the 26th Division, A.E.F, at Chateau-Thierry in July 1918
- Louis Cukela (1888–1956), US Marine Corps Major, awarded two Medals of Honor for same act in World War I

==== D ====
- Theodore L. Dobol (1915 – 1996), US Army non-commissioned officer of Polish-American origin who served with the 26th Infantry Regiment, 1st Infantry Division, veteran of World War II. He was highly decorated (four Silver Stars, two Legions of Merit, two Bronze Stars and five Purple Hearts)
- William Joseph "Wild Bill" Donovan (1883–1959), US Army Major General, commanded the 165th Infantry Regiment (federalized designation of the 69th New York Infantry, the "Fighting Irish") during World War I, and was Chief of the Office of Strategic Services (OSS) during World War II; also awarded the Distinguished Service Cross, Distinguished Service Medal, and National Security Medal, making him the only person to hold all four of the United States' highest awards

==== E ====
- Merritt A. Edson (1897–1955), US Marine Corps major general; received for his actions as commanding officer of the 1st Marine Raider Battalion
- Nelson E. Edwards (1887–1954), newsreel cameraman and war photographer, sergeant with the 152nd Depot Brigade at Camp Upton, New York, during World War I (1917–1919)
- Alan Louis Eggers (1895–1968), World War I
- Henry T. Elrod (1905–1941), US Marine Corps aviator; received for his heroism in the defense of Wake Island during World War II

==== F ====
- Ernest R. Feidler (1910–1976), US Coast Guard Rear Admiral, Judge Advocate General during the Korean War
- Frank J. Fletcher (1885–1973), US Navy Admiral, World War II; operational commander at Coral Sea and Midway
- Bruno Albert Forsterer (1869–1957), US Marine Corps sergeant; received for his actions during the Philippine–American War
- Joseph J. Foss (1915–2003), World War II US Marine Corps fighter ace and governor of South Dakota
- Wesley L. Fox (1931–2017), colonel; received for his actions during the Vietnam War

==== G ====
- James A. Graham (1940–1967), US Marine Corps officer; received for his actions during the Vietnam War
- Alfred M. Gray Jr. (1928–2024), US Marine Corps general
- Arthur J. Gregg (1928–2024), US Army general

==== H ====
- Walter Newell Hill (1881–1955), US Marine Corps officer; received for his actions during United States occupation of Veracruz
- Robert L. Howard (1939–2009), US Army Special Forces
- Thomas J. Hudner Jr. (1924–2017), US Navy aviator; received for his actions in trying to save the life of his wingman, Ensign Jesse L. Brown, during the Battle of Chosin Reservoir in the Korean War
- John Arthur Hughes (1880–1942), US Marine Corps officer; received for his actions during the United States occupation of Veracruz
- Henry L. Hulbert (1867–1918), US Marine Corps sergeant major; received for his actions during the Second Samoan Civil War

==== I ====
- Louis van Iersel (1893–1987), US Army sergeant, for action during World War I at Mouzon, France
- Jonas H. Ingram (1886–1952), US Navy admiral, for action in the 1914 Battle of Veracruz
- Edouard Victor Michel Izac (1891–1990), for action during World War I as a US Navy lieutenant

==== J ====
- Douglas T. Jacobson (1925–2000), US Marine Corps officer; received for his actions on Iwo Jima during World War II
- Arthur Jibilian (1923–2010), US Naval radio operator in the Office of Strategic Services, part of the Halyard Mission
- James E. Johnson (1926–1950) cenotaph, US Marine Corps sergeant; received for his actions during the Battle of Chosin Reservoir; his body was never recovered
- Edward Darlington Jones (1885–1954), US Coast Guard vice admiral

==== K ====
- Thomas R. Kerr (1843–1926), Civil War
- William F. Kernan (1946–2025), US Army General

==== L ====
- John H. Leims (1921–1985), US Marine Corps officer; received for his actions during the Battle of Iwo Jima during World War II

==== M ====
- Arthur MacArthur Jr. (1845–1912), US Army lieutenant general and father of General Douglas MacArthur
- David M. Maddox (1938–2026), US Army General; served as commander of chief
- Clarence Mathias (1876–1935), US Marine Corps Sergeant Major; received for his actions during the Boxer Rebellion
- Frederick W. Mausert III (1930–1951), US Marine Corps sergeant; received for his actions in the Battle of the Punchbowl during the Korean War
- Joseph J. McCarthy (1911–1996), US Marine Corps officer; received for his actions during the Battle of Iwo Jima during World War II
- Walter C. Monegan Jr. (1930–1950), US Marine Corps officer; received for his actions during the Korean War
- Audie Murphy (1925–1971), US Army officer, America's most decorated combat soldier of World War II and popular movie actor
- Reginald R. Myers (1919–2005), US Marine Corps officer; received for his actions during the Korean War.

==== N ====
- Wendell Cushing Neville (1870–1930), 14th Commandant of the Marine Corps; received for actions during the United States occupation of Veracruz
- Michael J. Novosel (1922–2006), US Army Chief Warrant Officer 4, known as Dean of the Dustoff Pilots for his two tours in the Vietnam War during which he flew 2,534 missions and airlifted nearly 5,600 medical evacuees

==== O ====
- Richard O'Kane (1911–1994), US Navy, commanding officer of the USS Tang (SS-306); received for his actions in combat against Japanese convoys on 23–24 October 1944
- Edward Albert Ostermann (1882–1969), US Marine Corps major general; received for his actions during the United States occupation of Haiti

==== P ====
- Everett P. Pope (1919–2009), US Marine Corps officer; received for his actions during the Battle of Peleliu in World War II
- David Dixon Porter (1877–1944), US Marine Corps major general and grandson of Admiral David Dixon Porter, also buried at Arlington; received for his actions during the Philippine–American War
- John H. Pruitt (1896–1918), US Marine Corps corporal; awarded two Medals of Honor for same act during the Battle of Blanc Mont Ridge during World War I

==== Q ====
- Peter H. Quinn (1873–1934), for action as a US Army private in the Philippine–American War

==== R ====
- Robert D. Reem (1925–1950), US Marine Corps officer; received for his actions during the Korean War
- George Croghan Reid (1876–1961), US Marine Corps brigadier general; received for his actions during the United States occupation of Veracruz
- Edmund Rice (1842–1906), US Army brigadier general; received for his actions in repelling Pickett's Charge at the Battle of Gettsyburg
- Robert G. Robinson (1896–1974), US Marine Corps officer; received for his actions, as a Gunnery Sergeant, during World War I

==== S ====
- Christian F. Schilt (1895–1987), US Marine Corps aviator, for using his actions during the United States occupation of Nicaragua
- John Schofield (1831–1906), commanding officer of the second Army of the Ohio during 1864 and 1865; Secretary of War under President Andrew Johnson; superintendent of the United States Military Academy 1876–1881; commanding general of the US Army 1888–1895; received for his actions at the Battle of Wilson's Creek in 1861
- David M. Shoup (1904–1983), 22nd Commandant of the Marine Corps; received for his actions during the Battle of Tarawa during World War II
- Ronald J. Shurer (1978–2020), US Army Special Forces medical sergeant; received for his actions in the Battle of Shok Valley during the War in Afghanistan.
- Daniel Sickles (1819–1914), major general, III Corps, Army of the Potomac, Union Army, Civil War; served as US Minister to Spain and as US Representative from New York
- Franklin E. Sigler (1924–1995), US Marine Corps private first class; received for his actions in the Battle of Iwo Jima during World War II
- Carl L. Sitter (1922–2000), US Marine Corps officer; received for his actions during the Korean War
- Luther Skaggs Jr. (1923–1976), US Marine Corps corporal; received for his actions in the Battle of Guam during World War II
- Sherrod E. Skinner Jr. (1929–1952), US Marine Corps officer; received for his actions during the Korean War
- Larry E. Smedley (1949–1967), US Marine Corps corporal; received for his actions during the Vietnam War
- John Lucian Smith (1914–1972), US Marine Corps aviator; received for his actions as a squadron commanding officer during Solomon Islands campaign in World War II
- Paul Ray Smith (1969–2003), US Army Sergeant First Class; received for his actions during the 2003 invasion of Iraq.
- Julius Stahel (1825–1912), Hungarian born Union general during the Civil War; received for his actions during the Battle of Piedmont
- Clarence E. Sutton (1871–1916), US Marine Corps sergeant; received for his actions during the Boxer Rebellion

==== T ====
- Clyde A. Thomason (1914–1942), US Marine who posthumously received the Medal of Honor for leading the Raid on Makin Island in August 1942.
- William George Thordsen (1879–1932), US Navy coxswain; received for his actions in the Philippine–American War
- Walter Thorn (1844–1920), Union Army officer in the Civil War

==== U ====
- Frank Monroe Upton (1896–1962), US Navy Sailor; received for action during World War I
- Matt Urban (1919–1995), US Army Lieutenant Colonel; received seven Purple Hearts for service in World War II
- Micheal E. Urell (1844–1910) US Army Soldier; received for action during the American Civil War

==== V ====
- Alexander Vandegrift (1887–1973), 18th Commandant of the Marine Corps; received for his actions during the Solomon Islands campaign in World War II

==== W ====
- Jonathan Mayhew Wainwright IV (1883–1953), US Army General, hero of Bataan and Corregidor, highest-ranking US prisoner of war in World War II
- Kenneth A. Walsh (1916–1998), US Marine Corps Aviator; received for his actions during the Solomon Islands campaign in World War II
- William G. Walsh (1922–1945), US Marine Corps Gunnery Sergeant; received for his actions during the Battle of Iwo Jima in World War II
- Orlando B. Willcox (1824–1907), US Army Brevet Major General; received for bravery leading the 1st Michigan Infantry Regiment (3 Months) at the First Battle of Bull Run during the American Civil War, later served as Division commander in the IX Corps (Union Army).
- Louis H. Wilson Jr. (1920–2005), 26th Commandant of the Marine Corps; received for his actions during the Battle of Guam in World War II
- William G. Windrich (1921–1950), US Marine Corps Staff Sergeant; received for his actions in the Battle of Chosin Reservoir during the Korean War

==== Y ====
- Frank Albert Young (1876–1941), US Marine Corps Private; received for his actions during the China Relief Expedition
- Gerald Orren Young (1930–1990), US Air Force Lieutenant Colonel; received for his actions in the Vietnam War

==== Z ====
- Jay Zeamer Jr. (1918–2007), US Air Force Lieutenant Colonel; received for action during World War II with the Army Air Force

=== Flag officers ===
==== A ====
- Creighton Abrams (1914–1974), US Army General who commanded US military operations in the Vietnam War 1968–1972
- Henry Harley "Hap" Arnold (1886–1950), first (and so far only) General of the Air Force
- Alexander Asboth (1811–1868), Hungarian leader, later Union general during the Civil War

==== B ====
- David E. Baker (1946–2009), US Air Force Brigadier General; holds distinction of being the only former prisoner of war of the Vietnam War to later fly combat missions during Operation Desert Storm
- Warner B. Bayley (1845–1928), US Navy Rear Admiral
- Gordon Beecher (1904–1973), US Navy Vice Admiral and composer
- Reginald R. Belknap (1871–1959), US Navy Rear Admiral
- Andrew E. K. Benham (1832–1905), US Navy Rear Admiral; serving in the Union Navy during the Civil War
- Charles F. Blair Jr. (1909–1978), US Air Force Brigadier General; buried with wife Maureen O'Hara
- Vicente T. Blaz (1928–2014), US Marine Corps Brigadier General and Delegate to Congress from Guam
- Claude C. Bloch (1878–1967), US Navy Admiral
- Jeremy Michael Boorda (1939–1996), US Navy Admiral and Chief of Naval Operations
- Donald Prentice Booth (1902–1993), US Army Lieutenant General, High Commissioner of the Ryukyu Islands 1958–1961
- Omar Nelson Bradley (1893–1981), commanded the 12th Army Group in Europe during World War II, first Chairman of the Joint Chiefs of Staff and last living five-star General
- Miles Browning (1897–1954), rear admiral, World War I and World War II Navy Officer and hero of the Battle of Midway
- Omar Bundy (1861–1940), World War I Major General who commanded the 1st Brigade, 1st Expeditionary Division in France, awarded the French Legion of Honor and the Croix de Guerre
- Edward Burke (1907–1967), US Navy Rear Admiral and World War II officer, Navy Cross recipient

==== C ====
- John Allen Campbell (1835–1880), brevet brigadier general; Civil War, first governor of Wyoming Territory in 1869 and Third Assistant Secretary of State
- Marion E. Carl (1915–1998), World War II US Marine Corps major general, fighter ace and record-setting test pilot
- Claire Lee Chennault (1893–1958), lieutenant general, military aviator who commanded the "Flying Tigers" during World War II
- John Clem (1851–1937), major general, aka Johnny Shiloh, arguably the youngest Non-Commissioned Officer ever to serve in the US Armed Forces; was the last living Civil War veteran on active duty at the time of his retirement
- John M. B. Clitz (1821–1897), US Navy Rear Admiral
- Edmund R. Colhoun (1821–1897), US Navy Rear Admiral
- Charles M. "Savvy" Cooke Jr. (1886–1970), US Navy Admiral
- Charles Austin Coolidge (1844–1926), brigadier general, served in Civil War, Indian Wars, Spanish–American War, Philippine–American War and the China Relief Expedition
- Ernest T. Cragg (1922–2006), US Air Force Major General
- George Crook (1828–1890), US Army Major General during the Civil War and campaigns against the Native Americans; one of his subordinates during the Civil War was future President Rutherford B. Hayes

==== D ====
- Arthur C. Davis (1893–1965), US Navy Admiral, pioneer of dive bombing
- Benjamin O. Davis Sr. (1880–1970), United States Army General; first African-American General Officer in the US Army and in the US military
- Benjamin O. Davis Jr. (1912–2002), World War II pilot, first African-American US Air Force General
- Jeremiah Andrew Denton Jr. (1924–2014), US Navy pilot shot down over Vietnam and held as a POW for over seven years; achieved the rank of admiral before retiring from the Navy; served in the US Senate from Alabama
- Sir John Dill (1881–1944), British diplomat and Field Marshal
- Abner Doubleday (1819–1893), Civil War General, erroneously credited with inventing baseball
- Franklin J. Drake (1846–1929), US Navy Rear Admiral

==== E ====
- Clarence Ransom Edwards (1860–1931), US Army Major General, commanded the 26th "Yankee" Division in World War I

==== F ====
- Nathan Bedford Forrest III (1905–1943), brigadier general of the US Army Air Forces, and a great-grandson of Confederate General Nathan Bedford Forrest; first American general killed in action during World War II

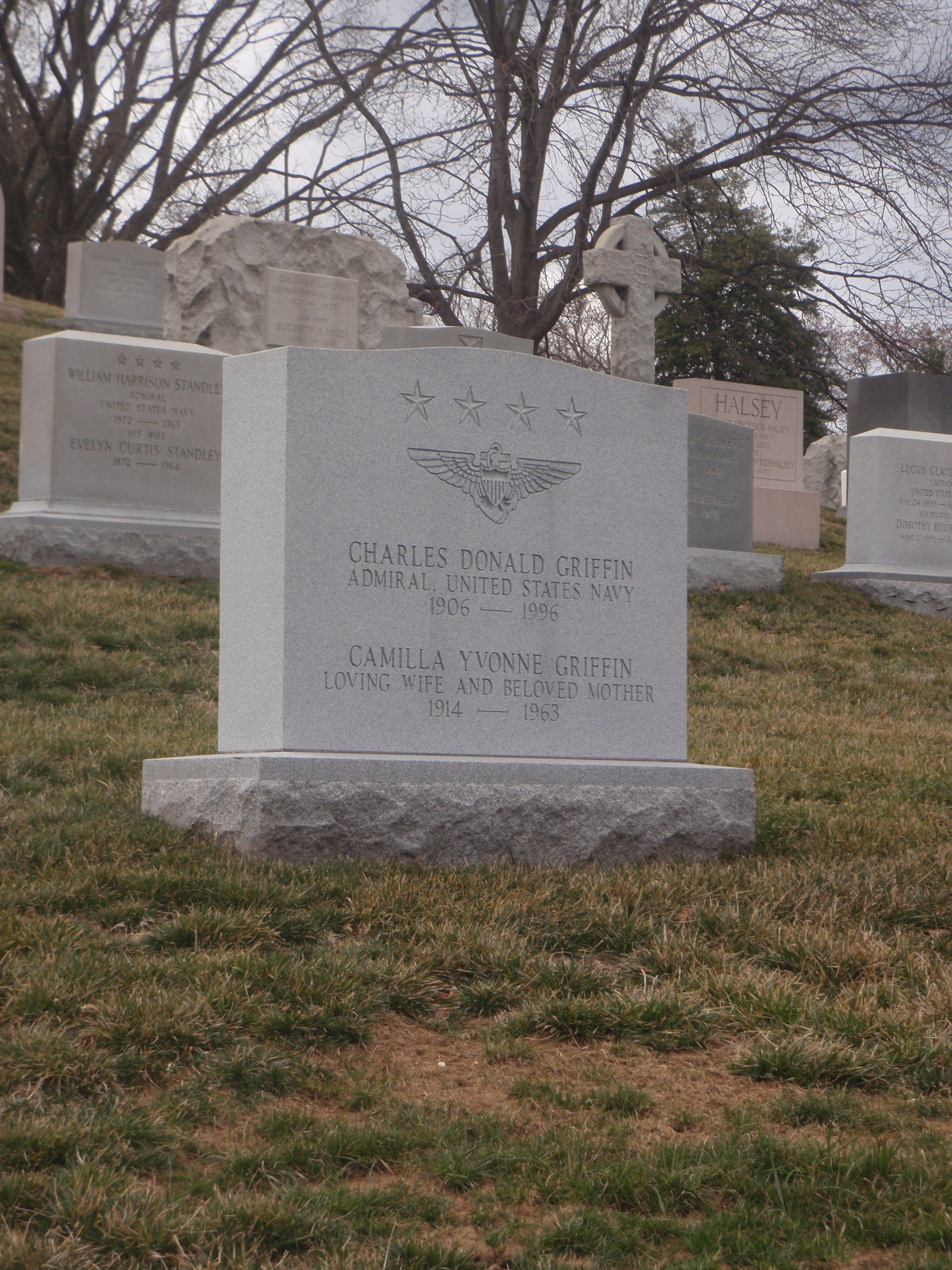
Charles D. Griffin, US Navy admiral

==== G ====
- Francis L. Garrett (1919–1992), US Navy Rear Admiral, Chief of Chaplains of the US Navy
- John Gibbon (1827–1896), brigadier general, Union Army, Civil War, most notably commander of 2nd Division, US II Corps that repelled Pickett's Charge at the Battle of Gettysburg
- William A. Glassford (1886–1958), US Navy Vice Admiral
- Harold J. Greene (1959–2014), US Army Major General
- Charles D. Griffin (1906–1996), US Navy Admiral
- Felix Gygax (1884–1977), US Navy Rear Admiral

==== H ====
- Eugene E. Habiger (1939–2022), US Air Force general
- William F. "Bull" Halsey Jr. (1882–1959), World War II Navy Fleet Admiral
- John Spencer Hardy (1913–2012), Chief of Operations in the Mediterranean of US Army Air Corps during World War II; later lieutenant general in US Air Force
- William Babcock Hazen (1830–1887), major general, served in the Western Union Armies during the Civil War. Served as Chief Signal Officer after the war
- James Meredith Helm (1855–1927), US Navy rear admiral
- Francis J. Higginson (1843–1931), US Navy rear admiral
- Jeanne M. Holm (1921–2010), US Air Force major general; first woman promoted to brigadier general in the Air Force; first woman promoted to major general in the US armed forces
- Grace Hopper (1906–1992), US Navy rear admiral, pioneering computer scientist who coined the term "bug"
- Olaf M. Hustvedt (1886–1978), US Navy Vice Admiral

==== I ====
- John Irwin (1832–1901), US Navy Rear Admiral

==== J ====
- Daniel "Chappie" James Jr. (1920–1978), US Air Force; first African American four-star general in the US armed forces
- David C. Jones (1921–2013), US Air Force, ninth Chairman of the Joint Chiefs of Staff

==== K ====
- Włodzimierz Krzyżanowski (1824–1887), Polish military leader and Union General in the American Civil War
- Philip Kearny (1815–1862), US Army Major General in the Mexican–American War and American Civil War
- Paul X. Kelley (1928–2019), US Marine Corps General who served as the 28th Commandant of the United States Marine Corps

==== L ====
- Rae Landy (1885–1952), Army Nurse Corps Lieutenant Colonel who served in World War I and World War II
- Henry Louis Larsen (1890–1962), US Marine Corps Lieutenant General; commanded the first deployed American troops in both World Wars; Governor of Guam and American Samoa
- John Marshall Lee (1914–2003), US Navy Vice Admiral, World War II, Korea, Vietnam, NATO, S.A.L.T Talks; Navy Cross, DSM, Legion of Merit; son of Lieutenant Colonel Alva Lee
- Eugene Michael Lynch (1923–2003), US Army Brigadier General, Distinguished Service Cross recipient

==== M ====
- Newton E. Mason (1850–1945), US Navy rear admiral
- Henry Pinckney McCain (1861–1941), US Army major general and Adjutant General of the US Army; uncle of Admiral John S. McCain Sr., granduncle of Admiral John S. McCain Jr., great-granduncle of US Senator John S. McCain III
- John S. McCain Jr. (1911–1981), US Navy admiral, grandnephew of Major General Henry Pinckney McCain, son of Admiral John S. McCain Sr., father of US Senator John S. McCain III
- John S. McCain Sr. (1884–1945), US Navy admiral, nephew of Major General Henry Pinckney McCain, father of Admiral John S. McCain Jr., grandfather of US Senator John S. McCain III
- William Alexander McCain (1878–1960), US Army brigadier general, brother of John McCain Sr., uncle of John McCain Jr.
- Bowman H. McCalla (1844–1910), US Navy rear admiral
- Stewart L. McKenney (1917–2012), brigadier general, mayor of American Vienna Occupation
- Montgomery C. Meigs (1816–1892), brigadier general; Arlington National Cemetery was established by Meigs, who commanded the garrison at Arlington House and appropriated the grounds on June 15, 1864, for use as a military cemetery
- Nelson A. Miles (1839–1925), US Army lieutenant general; served in the Civil War, Indian Wars, and the Spanish–American War; noted for accepting the surrender of Geronimo and his band of Apache
- Joseph Mower (1827–1870), major general, served in the western Union Armies during the Civil War
- Dennis J. Murphy (1932–2023), U.S. Marine Corps major general, served in the Vietnam War and later commanded the 2nd Marine Division

==== N ====
- Reginald F. Nicholson (1852–1939), US Navy rear admiral; last US Navy officer on active duty to have seen service during the Civil War; first US naval attaché to Ecuador and Peru

==== O ====
- Raymond T. Odierno (1954–2021), general, 38th Chief of Staff, United States Army, 2011–2015
- Edward Ord (1818–1883), major general, Army of the James during the Appomattox Campaign, Union Army, Civil War

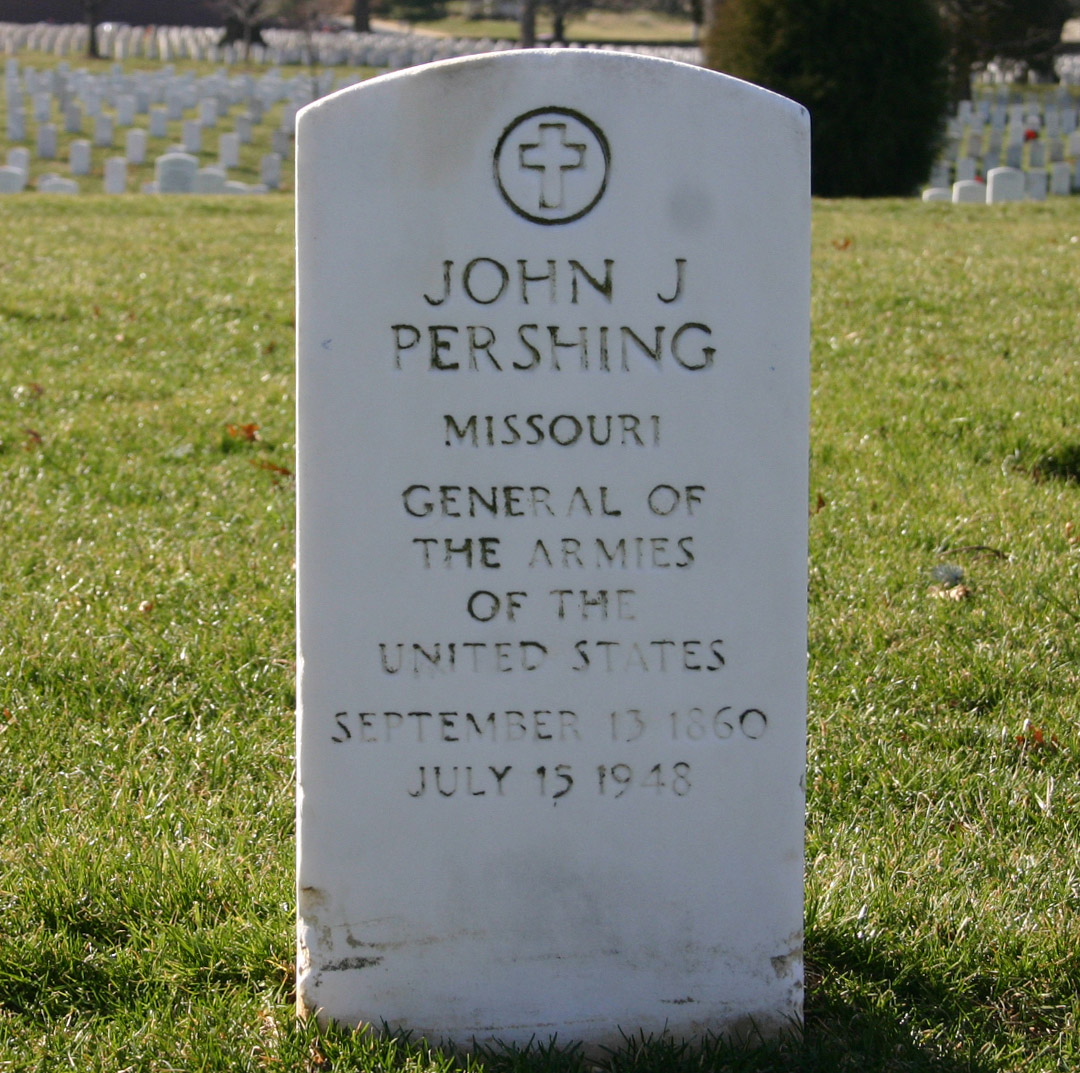
John J. Pershing, commander of the American Expeditionary Forces in World War I

==== P ====
- Mason Patrick (1863–1942) Major General, US Army; Chief of US Air Service; Chief of US Air Corps
- George S. Patton IV (1923–2004), US Army major general and son of famed World War II general George S. Patton
- Raymond Stanton Patton (1882–1937), rear admiral and first flag officer of the United States Coast and Geodetic Survey Corps and second Director of the United States Coast and Geodetic Survey (1929–1937)
- John J. Pershing (1860–1948), commander of the American Expeditionary Forces in World War I and America's first General of the Armies
- David Dixon Porter (1813–1891), admiral, Union Navy, Civil War, most notable as the Union naval commander during the Vicksburg Campaign, a turning point of the war which split the Confederacy in two; grandfather of Marine general and Medal of Honor recipient David Dixon Porter, also buried at Arlington

==== R ====
- John Aaron Rawlins (1831–1869), Civil War general, chief of staff and later Secretary of War to Ulysses S. Grant
- Alfred C. Richmond (1902–1984), admiral, 11th Commandant of the Coast Guard
- Hyman G. Rickover (1900–1986), admiral, father of the Nuclear Navy and the longest-serving member of the US Military with 63 years of service (1918–1982).
- Matthew Ridgway (1895–1993), World War II and Korean War general, Chief of Staff of the Army
- William S. Rosecrans (1819–1898), major general, Army of the Cumberland, Union Army, Civil War
- William T. Ryder (1913–1992), brigadier general; first American paratrooper

==== S ====
- Thomas R. Sargent III (1914–2010), vice admiral, Vice Commandant of the Coast Guard
- August Schomburg (1908–1972), lieutenant general, Commander US Army Ordnance and Missile Command; commander, Industrial College of the Armed Forces
- Gustavus H. Scott (1812–1882), US Navy rear admiral, exhumed in 1896 from Oak Hill Cemetery in Washington, D.C., and reburied at Arlington National Cemetery
- Benedict J. Semmes Jr. (1913–1994), US Navy vice admiral
- John Shalikashvili (1936–2011), general, Supreme Allied Commander Europe (1992–1993), Chairman of the Joint Chiefs of Staff (1993–1997)
- Philip Sheridan (1831–1888), general, Union Army, Civil War and commanding general, US Army, 1883–88
- Robert F. Sink (1905–1965), US Army lieutenant general and former regimental commander of the 506th Parachute Infantry Regiment, 101st Airborne Division; a close friend of Easy Company commander Major Richard Winters, he is portrayed by Vietnam veteran and retired US Marine Corps captain Dale Dye in the HBO/BBC miniseries Band of Brothers
- Joseph S. Skerrett (1833–1897), US Navy rear admiral
- Walter Bedell Smith (1895–1961), general, US Army, World War II, Dwight D. Eisenhower's Chief of Staff during Eisenhower's tenure at SHAEF and Director of the CIA 1950–1953; served as US Ambassador to the Soviet Union 1946–1948
- Harold I. Small (1932–2015), US Army Major General, Commanding General US Army Transportation Command, 1980–1985, Commanding General Fort Eustis, 1978–1985, Korean War, Vietnam War.
- Charles Stillman Sperry (1847–1911), US Navy rear admiral, commander of the Great White Fleet, namesake of USS Charles S. Sperry (DD-967)
- Robert Francis Anthony Studds (1896–1962), United States Coast and Geodetic Survey Corps admiral and engineer, fourth Director of the United States Coast and Geodetic Survey

==== T ====
- Robert A. "Fuzzy" Theobald (1884–1957), US Navy rear admiral who commanded Navy forces in the Aleutian Islands Campaign during World War II
- Richard Trefry (1924–2023), United States Army General

==== V ====
- Howard L. Vickery (1892–1946), vice admiral, US Navy and World War II merchant shipbuilder

==== W ====
- Donald M. Weller (1908–1985), major general, pioneer of Naval gunfire support; served during World War II
- Joseph Wheeler (1836–1906), served as a major general of the Confederate Army during the Civil War, and the US Army during the Spanish–American War and Philippine–American War
- Orde Charles Wingate (1903–1944), British major general, creator and commander of the Chindits
- Spencer S. Wood (1861–1940), US Navy rear admiral
- Clark H. Woodward (1877–1968), vice admiral, served in five wars: the Spanish–American War, Philippine–American War, Boxer Rebellion and both World Wars
- Horatio Wright (1820–1899), major general; commanded VI Corps of the Army of the Potomac from the Overland Campaign to the end of the Civil War; then served as the Chief of Engineers for the US Army Corps of Engineers; worked on projects such as the Brooklyn Bridge and the completion of the Washington Monument

=== Other military burials ===
==== A ====
- Quentin C. Aanenson (1921–2008), World War II veteran fighter pilot and former captain of the 391st Fighter Squadron, 366th Fighter Group, 9th Air Force, US Army Air Corps
- George Adamski (1891–1965), noted ufologist
- Olavi Alakulppi (1915–1990), Finnish cross country skier and recipient of the Mannerheim Cross who rose to the rank of lieutenant colonel in the US Army
- Bud Anderson (1922–2024), US Air Forces Officer
- John B. Anderson (1922–2017), World War II staff sergeant and politician

==== B ====
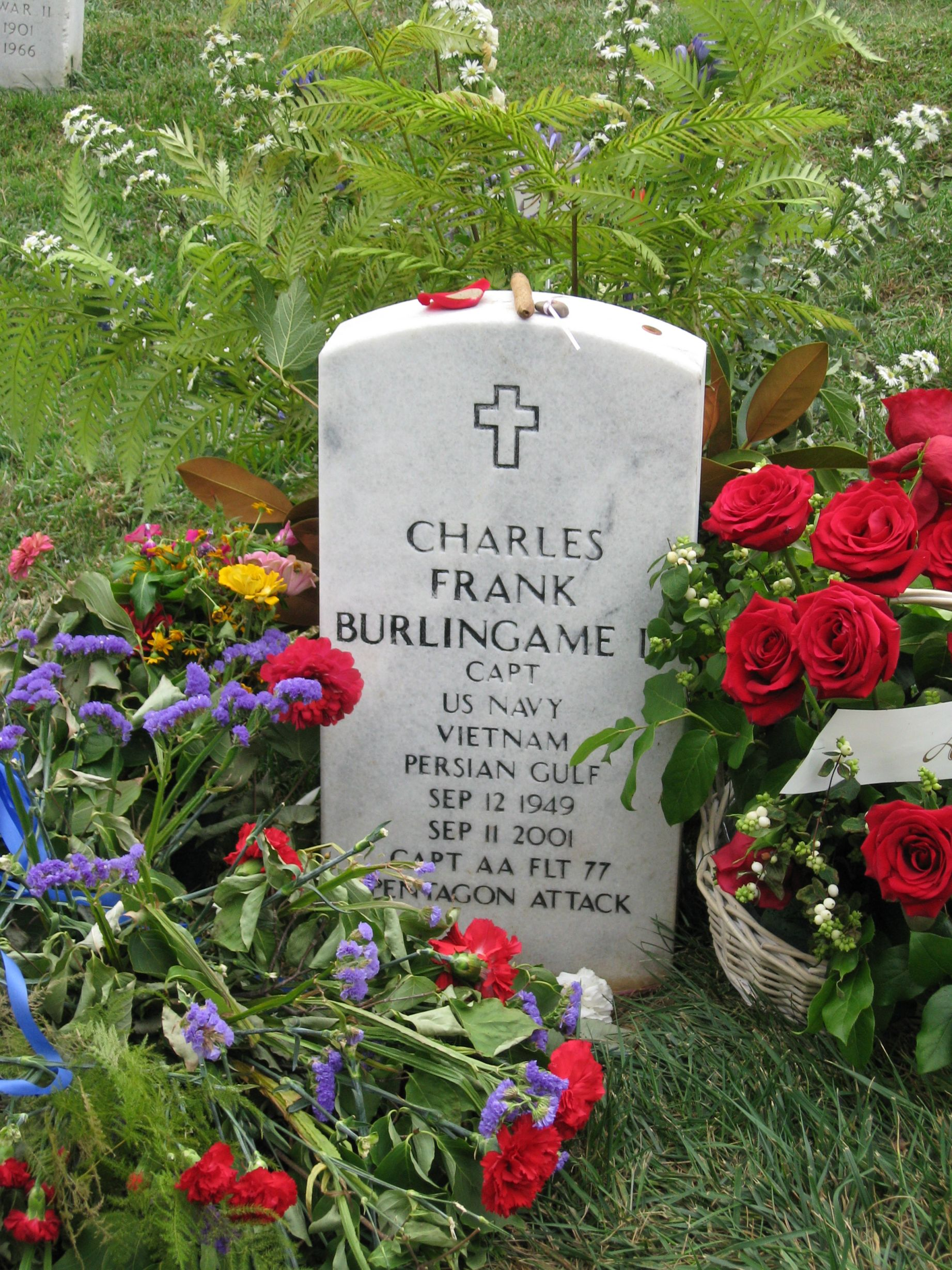
Charles Burlingame, pilot killed during September 11 attacks

- Alan Bean (1932–2018), astronaut, fourth person to walk on the Moon (Apollo 12)
- Van D. Bell Jr. (1918–2009), US Marine Corps colonel, recipient of two Navy Crosses
- Albert Blithe (1923–1967), US Army paratrooper; one of several Easy Company soldiers depicted in Band of Brothers.
- Ruby G. Bradley (1907–2002), colonel; with 34 medals, one of the most decorated women in US military history
- Alfred Winsor Brown (1885–1938), US Navy Captain who served as 31st Naval Governor of Guam
- Ron Brown (1942–1996), former US Army Captain, served as the United States Secretary of Commerce, former chairman of the DNC, died in a plane crash
- Frank Buckles (1901–2011), last known American veteran of World War I
- Charles Burlingame (1949–2001), US Navy Captain, pilot of hijacked American Airlines Flight 77 during September 11 attacks
- Alexander Butterfield (1926–2026), US Air Force Officer

==== C ====
- Willis Carto (1926–2015), American political activist
- Roger Chaffee (1935–1967), astronaut killed in the Apollo 1 fire
- Samuel-Edmour St. Onge Chapleau (1839–1921), US Army major in the Civil War; Clerk of the Senate of Canada and Clerk of the Parliaments of Canada, 1900–1917
- William Christman (1843–1864), first soldier buried at Arlington
- Bertram Tracy Clayton (1862–1918), Congressman from New York, killed in action in 1918
- William Colby (1920–1996) Member of the Office of Strategic Services, Director of Central Intelligence.
- Michael Collins (astronaut) (1930–2021), US Air Force officer, NASA Astronaut; Command Module Pilot for Apollo 11.
- Truman W. Crawford (1934–2003), US Marine Corps colonel (1966–1996); commander of the United States Marine Drum and Bugle Corps; oldest active duty Marine at the time of his retirement; formerly US Air Force master sergeant (1953–1963); musical director of the US Air Force Drum and Bugle Corps
- William P. Cronan (1879–1929), US Navy officer and 19th Naval Governor of Guam
- Scott Crossfield (1921–2006), US Naval aviator and test pilot; first to fly at twice the speed of sound; played a major role in the design and development of the North American X-15

==== D ====
- John Charles Daly (1914–1991), radio and TV newsman and television host on What's My Line?
- Jane Delano (1862–1919), Director of Army Nursing Corps
- Dieter Dengler (1938–2001), US Navy pilot shot down over Laos who escaped from a Pathet Lao POW camp; subject of the film Rescue Dawn

==== E ====
- Hilan Ebert (1903–1942) cenotaph, received the Navy Cross for action aboard the USS Northampton in World War II; USS Ebert was named in his honor
- John Joy Edson (1846–1935), Civil War; executive and treasurer of National Geographic Society
- Aleksander Einseln (1931–2017) United States Army colonel who later became general and commander-in-chief of the Estonian Defence Forces

==== G ====
- Rene Gagnon (1925–1979), one of the six US Marines immortalized in Joe Rosenthal's iconic photo Raising the Flag on Iwo Jima
- John Glenn (1921–2016), first American to orbit the Earth; US Senator; fighter pilot in World War II and Korea
- Mike Gravel (1930–2021), first lieutenant in the US Army, US Senator
- Gus Grissom (1926–1967), astronaut killed in the Apollo 1 fire
- Jerry Don Glover (1936–2020), 20-year Air-Force military career, he was a Navigator in Vietnam and retired as a Lt. Colonel with honors and a Purple Heart

==== H ====
- David Haskell Hackworth (1930–2005), colonel and highly decorated soldier
- Ira Hayes (1923–1955), one of the six US marines immortalized in Joe Rosenthal's iconic photo Raising the Flag on Iwo Jima
- Nicholas H. Heck (1882–1953), United States Coast and Geodetic Survey captain, geophysicist, seismologist, oceanographer, and hydrographic surveyor
- Anton Hilberath (1898–1946), one of at least 830 German Prisoners of War, who died and were buried in the United States. His is the only grave of a German POW at Arlington National Cemetery.
- Kara Spears Hultgreen (1965–1994), the first female naval carrier-based fighter pilot
- Alexander Hunter (1843–1914), Confederate private and author of the Civil War memoir Johnny Reb & Billy Yank

==== J ====
- Benjamin R. Jacobs (1879–1963), served as a US Army captain in both World War I and World War II, with his wife, Margaret Ann Connell Jacobs (1890–1973)
- James Jabara (1923–1966), first American jet ace in history, credited with shooting down 15 enemy aircraft
- George Juskalian (1914–2010), US Army veteran, three decades and fought in three wars – World War II, Korean War, and Vietnam War

==== K ====
- Mildred Kelly (1928–2003), US Army command sergeant major; first African American woman to serve as an Army sergeant major
- Jack Koehler (1930–2012), US Army veteran, Associated Press executive and former White House Communications Director
- Humayun Khan (soldier) (1976–2004), Iraq War
- Kareem Rashad Sultan Khan (1987–2007) Iraq War

==== L ====
- Walter Francis Layer (1907–1965), US Marine Corps Officer; Legion of Merit award recipient, member of the Naval Order of the United States
- Felix Z. Longoria Jr. (1920–1945), Mexican American soldier in the US Army; killed in World War II
- Liu Nia-chien, Major in the Chinese Military, died October 19, 1946
- Ruth A. Lucas (1920–2013), the first African American female Air Force Colonel
- Francis Lupo (1895–1918), private killed in France during World War I; holds the distinction of possibly being the US service member missing in action longest to be found (1918–2003)

==== M ====
- Mark Matthews (1894–2005), last surviving Buffalo Soldier
- Anna Maxwell (1851–1929), the American Florence Nightingale; was buried due to her contributions to the Army Nurse Corps
- David McCampbell (1910–1996), the US Navy's top World War II fighter ace with 34 kills
- Glenn Miller (1904–1944) cenotaph, Army Air Forces Major and well known band leader who disappeared over the English Channel

==== O ====
- Buckey O'Neill (1860–1898), officer in Theodore Roosevelt's Rough Riders who was killed in the Battle of San Juan Hill
- Peter J. Ortiz (1913–1988), US Marine Corps colonel, member of the Office of Strategic Services who fought in Europe during World War II, recipient of two Navy Crosses
- Robert F. Overmyer (1936–1996), test pilot, US Marine Corps colonel, and NASA astronaut
- William Owens (1980–2017), a US Navy SEAL who was killed during the raid on Yakla in January 2017; the first combatant to die during the presidency of Donald Trump

==== P ====
- Francis Gary Powers (1929–1977), U-2 pilot shot down over the Soviet Union in 1960
- Milton C. Portmann (1888–1967) Major 89th Division World War I. Professional football player. Attorney. (Cenotaph)
- Colin Powell (1937–2021), U.S. National Security Advisor, 1987–89, Chairman of the Joint Chiefs of Staff, 1989–93, 65th U.S. Secretary of State, 2001–05.

==== R ====
- Henry M. Robert (1837–1923), brigadier general; US Army Corps of Engineers, 1857–1901; in 1876 published the first edition of Robert's Rules of Order, his manual of parliamentary procedure, which remains today the most common parliamentary authority in the United States
- Fernando E. Rodríguez Vargas, US Army major (1888–1932), born in Puerto Rico, a pioneer in dental bacteriology who discovered the bacteria that causes cavities
- Donald Rumsfeld (1932–2021), 6th White House Chief of Staff, 1974–1975, 13th and 21st U.S. Secretary of Defense, 1975–1977, 2001–2006

==== S ====
- Thomas Selfridge (1882–1908), first lieutenant in the US Army and the first person to die in a crash of a powered airplane.
- Robert Stethem (1961–1985), United States Navy Seabee diver murdered by Hezbollah terrorists during the hijacking of TWA Flight 847. USS Stethem (DDG-63) is named in his honor.
- Robert L. Stirm (1933–2025), US Air Force Colonel and Vietnam War POW featured in the Pulitzer Prize winning photo Burst of Joy
- Michael Strank (1919–1945), one of the six US marines immortalized in Joe Rosenthal's iconic photo Raising the Flag on Iwo Jima; killed in action just days after the photo was taken.
- Leroy Suddath (1931–2020), major general

==== T ====
- William Cooper Talley (1831–1901), brevet brigadier general for the Union Army during the U.S. Civil War
- Larry Thorne (born as Lauri Törni, 1919–1965), Finnish soldier who served in the US special forces and was a World War II veteran; called "soldier who fought under three flags" (Finland, Germany, and US); also, the only former member of the Waffen SS to be interred in Arlington
- Thomas Tipton Thornburgh (1843–1879), soldier for the Union Army and died at the Battle of Milk Creek
- R. Ewell Thornton (1865–1928), major in World War I, Virginia state senator
- John Almy Tompkins (1837–1916), Lieutenant Colonel in the Union Army during the U.S. Civil War
- James C. Toy (died 1914), captain of the Union Army during the Civil War

==== V ====
- Blake Wayne Van Leer (1926–1997), Commander and Captain in the U.S. Navy. Lead SeaBee program and lead the nuclear research and power unit at McMurdo Station during Operation Deep Freeze.
- Humbert Roque Versace (1937–1965), US Army captain of Puerto Rican–Italian descent awarded the Medal of Honor—for his heroic actions while a prisoner of war (POW) during the Vietnam War.

==== W ====
- Joshua Wheeler (1975–2015), US Army Delta Force operator. Silver Star recipient. The first American to be killed fighting ISIS insurgents and the first American to be killed in Iraq since November 2011.

==== Y ====
- Charles Young (1864–1922), first African-American colonel in the US Army
- John Young (1930–2018), NASA astronaut and ninth man to walk on the moon (Apollo 16).

== Other notable military service members ==
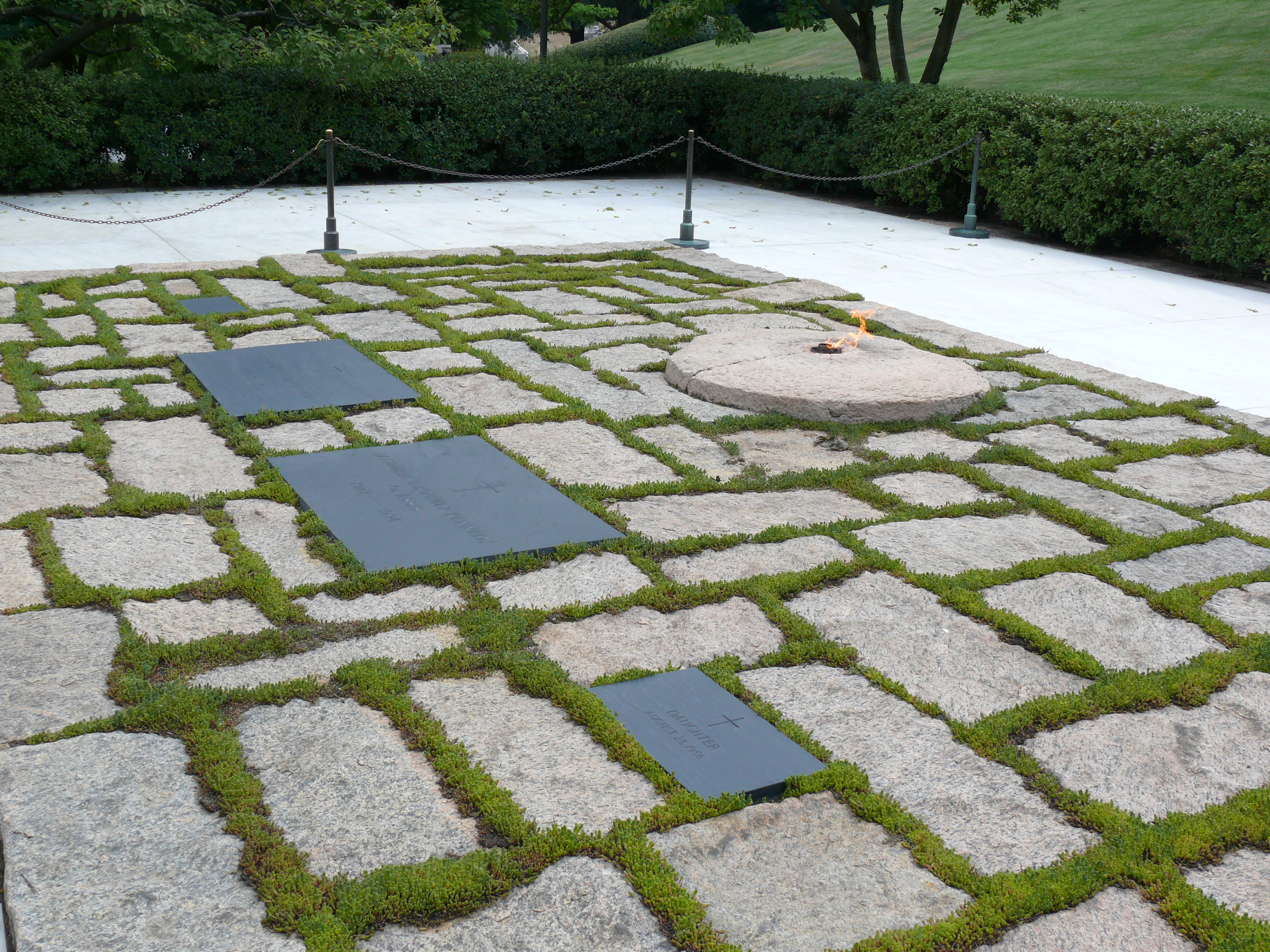
John F. Kennedy and Jacqueline Kennedy Onassis

=== A ===
- Peter H. Allabach (1824–1892), colonel in the Union Army during the Civil War, Chief of the United States Capitol Police

=== B ===
- William B. Bader, Assistant Secretary of State for Educational and Cultural Affairs
- Joseph J. Bartlett (1834–1893), Union Brigadier General during the Civil War, New York attorney, and U.S. diplomat
- Sosthenes Behn (1882–1957), businessman and founder of ITT Corporation
- William W. Belknap, Army general, secretary of war
- Ludwig Bemelmans, author of the Madeline children's series.
- Hugo Black, Associate Justice of the Supreme Court of the United States
- William J. Brennan Jr., Associate Justice of the Supreme Court of the United States
- Al Brodax, animator
- Ron Brown, Secretary of Commerce
- William Jennings Bryan, Secretary of State, three-time presidential candidate, orator
- William Francis Buckley, CIA station chief, murdered in Beirut

=== C ===
- Frank Carlucci (1930–2018), Secretary of Defense
- Jacob Chestnut (1940–1998), United States Capitol Police officer killed in the 1998 Capitol shooting attack
- Purnell W. Choppin (1929–2021), virologist and physician
- Clark Clifford (1906–1998), Secretary of Defense, advisor to four presidents
- Winifred Collins (1911–1999), a World War II WAVES
- Charles "Pete" Conrad Jr. (1930–1999), Apollo astronaut, third man to walk on the Moon
- Jackie Cooper (1922–2011), actor, television director, producer and executive
- James C. Corman (1920–2000), California politician
- Namahyoke Curtis (1871–1935), nurse during the Spanish–American War and civil leader.

=== D ===
- Dwight F. Davis, Secretary of War; established the Davis Cup
- Michael E. DeBakey, famous cardiovascular physician; US Army soldier during World War II
- John Dingell, World War II veteran and politician
- Bob Dole (1923–2021), served in World War II as a second lieutenant in the US Army's 10th Mountain Division, was seriously wounded by a German shell that struck his upper back and right arm while engaging in combat near Castel d'Aiano in the Apennine mountains southwest of Bologna, Italy. Later became a member of Kansas state House of Representatives, County Attorney of Russell County, Kansas, represented his home state of Kansas as a member of US House of Representatives and as a US Senator, and was the Republican nominee in the 1996 United States Presidential election. Awarded Bronze Star and Purple Heart.
- John Foster Dulles, secretary of state
- Charles Durning, Army veteran and actor

=== E ===
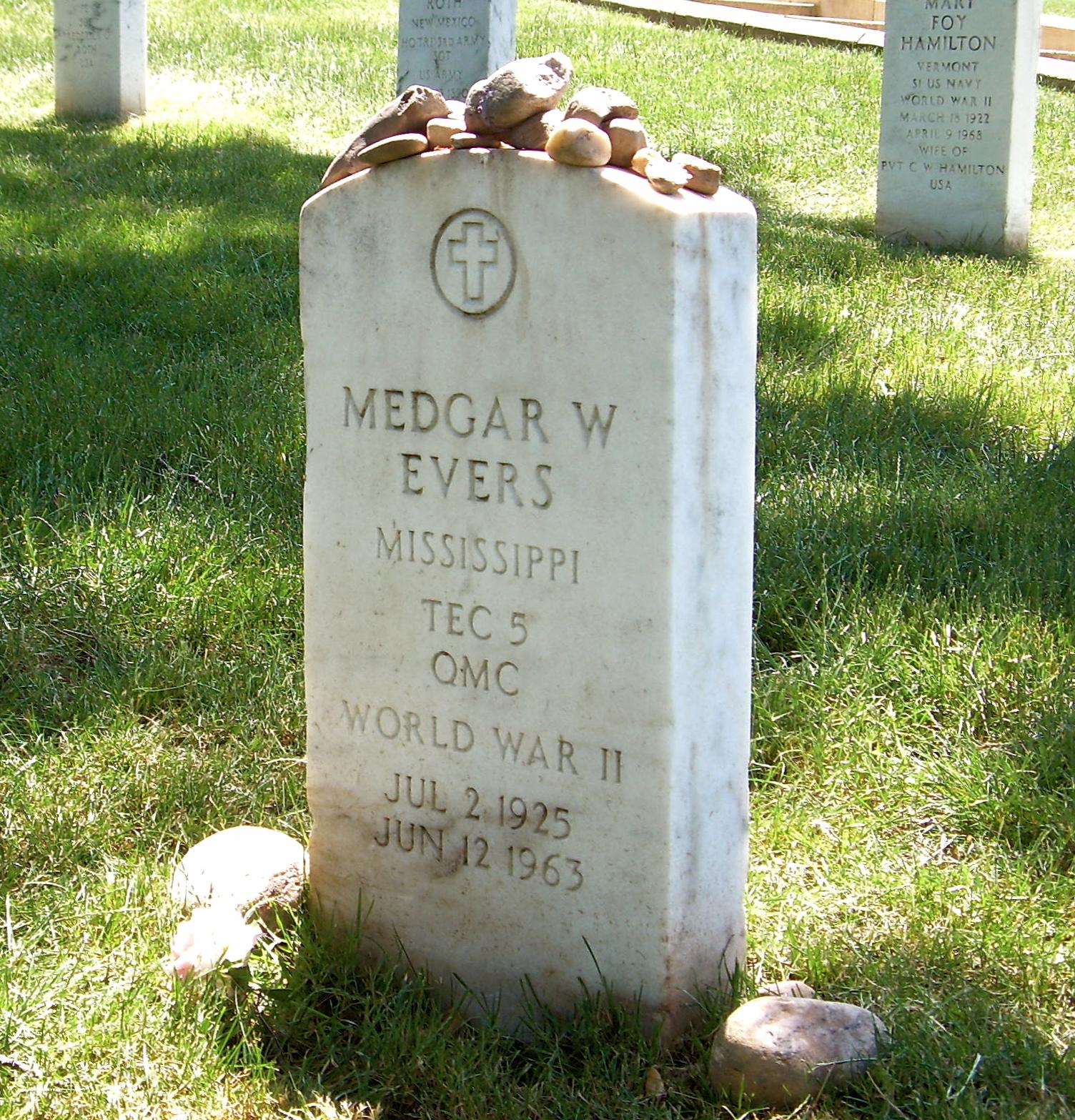
Medgar Evers, civil rights activist

- John Egan (1915-1961), World War II and Korean War veteran and career Air Force Officer.
- R. Lee Ermey (1944–2018), USMC staff sergeant and actor
- Medgar Evers (1925–1963), NAACP field secretary in Mississippi during the Civil Rights Movement; assassinated in 1963

=== F ===
- Arthur A. Fletcher, civil rights advocate
- James Florio, Governor of New Jersey (1990–1994)
- Lawrence Freedman, former US Army Special operations soldier with Delta Force; CIA paramilitary operative killed in Somalia in 1992
- William F. Friedman, US Army cryptologist who co-created the field of American cryptanalysis with his wife Elizebeth Friedman, and broke many ciphers, including the Japanese Code Purple in World War II

=== G ===
- Alex Gard (1898–1948), US Navy sailor; famous New York City restaurant and theatrical cartoonist of Russian descent
- Richard F. Gordon Jr. (1929–2017), astronaut
- Stanley L. Greigg, US Congressman from Iowa

=== H ===
- Peter Hackes, Navy Captain and correspondent
- Alexander Haig, secretary of state, 1981–82
- Robert Halperin, competitive Star-class sailor, and Olympic bronze medalist and Pan American Games gold medalist
- Dashiell Hammett, author
- Oliver Wendell Holmes Jr. (1841–1935), Associate Justice of the Supreme Court of the United States, wounded three times in the Civil War, "The Great Dissenter"
- Kara Spears Hultgreen (1965–1994), US Navy officer and naval aviator; first American woman fighter pilot in the US Navy; first female fighter pilot killed after the Department of Defense Risk Rule

=== I ===
- Robert G. Ingersoll, political leader and orator, noted for his agnosticism
- Paul Ignatius (1920–2025), US secretary of the navy

=== J ===
- René Joyeuse (1920–2012), free French Officer (Captain) who served in the Office of Strategic Services (OSS) during World War II and was awarded the Distinguished Service Cross; physician; co-founder of the American Trauma Society
- Henry S. Julian (1862–1939), member of the Missouri House of Representatives and military officer during the Spanish–American War

=== K ===
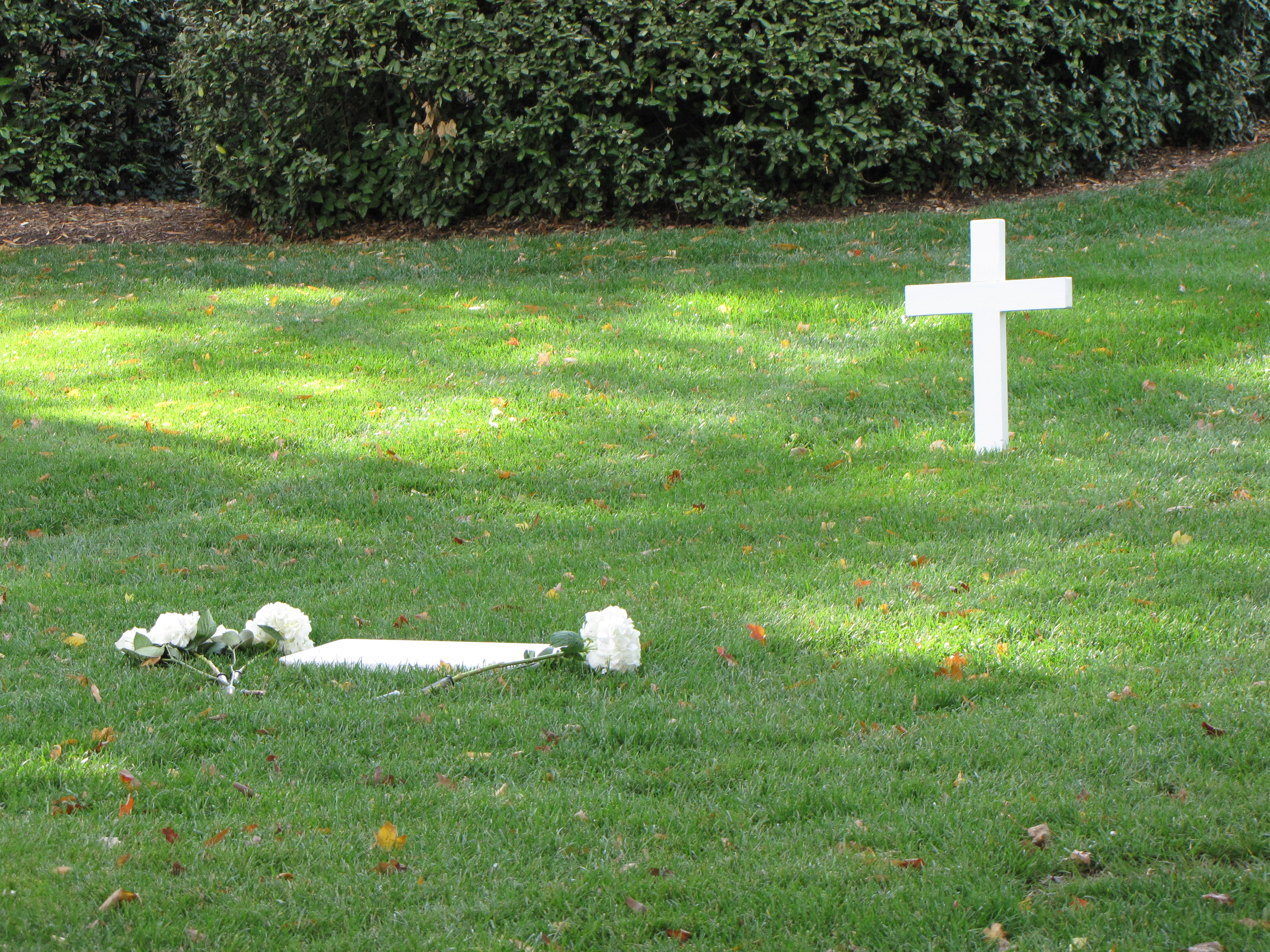
Edward M. Kennedy, US Senator

- Kenneth Keating (1900–1975), brigadier general, US Senator from New York (1959–1965)
- Edward Stanley Kellogg (1870–1948), US Navy Captain, 16th Governor of American Samoa (1923–1925)
- Burt Kennedy (1922–2001), US Army Lieutenant during World War II, film director and screenwriter
- John F. Kennedy (1917–1963), US Navy officer during World War II, US Representative (1947–1953) and US Senator (1953–1961) from Massachusetts, President of the United States (1961–1963)
- Robert F. Kennedy (1925–1968), Attorney General of the United States (1961–1964), US Senator from New York (1965–1968)
- Ted Kennedy (1932–2009), US Army veteran (1951–1953), US Senator from Massachusetts (1962–2009)
- Kareem Rashad Sultan Khan (1987–2007), Iraq War
- Humayun Khan, US Army captain
- Frank Kowalski, US Army veteran of World War II; US Representative from Connecticut

=== L ===
- Frank Lautenberg, World War II veteran and US Senator from New Jersey
- Paul Laxalt, World War II medic and Governor of and US Senator from Nevada
- Kurt Chew-Een Lee (1926–2014), first Chinese American commissioned as a regular officer in the US Marine Corps. Korean War
- Pierre Charles L'Enfant, French military engineer, architect, and urban planner; designed the city of Washington
- Henry Balding Lewis, US Army major general, Veterans Administration
- Robert Todd Lincoln, Secretary of War, son of former US President Abraham Lincoln
- Joe Louis, world heavyweight boxing champion
- Allard Lowenstein, US Congressman from New York
- Richard Lugar, US Senator from Indiana
- John R. Lynch, freedman, US Army major, and member of Congress

=== M ===
- Arthur MacArthur III (1876–1923), US Navy captain, brother of General Douglas MacArthur
- Crandal Mackey (1865–1957), Lawyer and commonwealth attorney of Arlington, Virginia
- Mike Mansfield (1903–2001), Navy veteran of World War I, Army private, Marine Corps private; longest-serving Senate Majority Leader; longest-serving Ambassador to Japan
- George C. Marshall (1880–1959), Chief of Staff of the Army, General of the Army, Emissary to China, Secretary of State, and Secretary of Defense; instrumental in developing the European Recovery Program (Marshall Plan) after World War II
- Richard Jaquelin Marshall (1895–1973), Major General US Army; brother to St. Julien Ravenel Marshall and cousin to George C. Marshall
- St. Julien Ravenel Marshall (1904–1989), Brigadier General USMC brother to Richard Jaquelin Marshall and cousin to George C. Marshall
- Lee Marvin (1924–1987), Marine Corps veteran and actor. Purple Heart, Presidential Unit Citation, American Campaign Medal, Asiatic Pacific Campaign Medal, World War II Victory Medal, and Combat Action Ribbon. 56 motion picture acting appearances resulting in 18 Award nominations with 11 awards. 212 Television credits resulting in 1 Emmy nomination. Father of 4.
- Bill Mauldin, editorial cartoonist; noted for World War II-era work satirizing military life in Stars and Stripes
- George B. McClellan Jr. (1865–1940), Mayor of New York (1904–1909), son of Union Army major general George B. McClellan
- Ruth Colvin Starrett McGuire (1893–1950), plant pathologist
- John C. Metzler, World War II sergeant, former superintendent of Arlington National Cemetery (1951–1972); his son John C. Metzler Jr. was also the superintendent 1991–2010
- Daniel Patrick Moynihan (1927–2003), US Senator from New York

=== P ===
- Phelps Phelps, 38th Governor of American Samoa and United States Ambassador to the Dominican Republic
- Spot Poles, considered among the greatest outfielders of the Negro leagues
- Lewis Burwell Puller Jr. (1945–1994), attorney, Pulitzer Prize-winning author and former officer in the US Marine Corps

=== Q ===
- Manuel Quezon (1878–1944), 2nd President of the Philippines (1935–1944); served in the Philippine Revolutionary Army; transferred in 1946 to the Manila North Cemetery and subsequently transferred to the Quezon Memorial Shrine in 1979.

=== R ===
- William Rehnquist, US Army Air Forces Sergeant (World War II), Chief Justice of the United States
- Charles Herschel "Charlie" Reiner (1918–2001), brother to famous comedian and producer Carl Reiner, served in the 9th Division in World War II.
- Earl W. Renfroe, US Army Colonel (World War II), orthodontist who helped originate the concept of preventive and interceptive orthodontics
- Frank Reynolds, US Army Staff Sergeant (World War II), ABC television anchorman
- John Raymond Rice, US Army Sergeant First Class (Korean Conflict), who was denied a burial in Sioux City, Iowa because of him being Native American (Ho-Chunk)
- Henry Richardson, US Army Major (World War II, Korean War, Vietnam War), first African American state legislator in New Hampshire
- Bradbury Robinson, US Army Captain (World War I); threw the first forward pass in American football history; physician; nutritionist; conservationist; and local politician
- Lewis C. Rockwell, US Army aviator killed in a flying accident in 1912
- William P. Rogers, US Navy Lieutenant Commander (World War II); politician; Attorney General, Secretary of State
- Malcolm Ross, US Navy Captain (World War II), an atmospheric scientist and balloonist who set several records for altitude and scientific inquiry. In 1960, set the altitude record for manned balloon flight.

=== S ===
- John Seymour (1937-2026), US Senator from California
- Brian Sicknick (1978–2021), United States Capitol Police officer.
- Samuel W. Small, journalist, evangelist, prohibitionist
- Helmut Sonnenfeldt (1926–2012), foreign policy expert for Henry Kissinger
- Johnny Micheal Spann, CIA officer and former US Marine Corps captain; first American killed in Afghanistan
- Clarence O. Sherrill (1876–1959), lieutenant colonel during World War I
- Orvan R. Smeder, US Coast Guard Rear Admiral
- Cordwainer Smith (1913–1966), Army officer involved in the creation of the Office of War Information and the Operation Planning and Intelligence Board, science fiction author
- Siegmund Spiegel (1919–2016), architect, activist, and Holocaust lecturer; Master Sergeant in World War II
- John Paul Stevens (1920–2019), Navy intelligence officer in the Pacific Theater, Lieutenant commander, Associate Justice of the Supreme Court of the United States
- Ted Stevens (1923–2010), US Senator from Alaska
- Potter Stewart, World War II sailor and Associate Justice of the Supreme Court of the United States
- Cecil W. Stoughton (1920–2008), White House photographer for President Kennedy
- Samuel S. Stratton, 15-term U.S. representative from New York
- Anthony Sydes (1941–2015), actor

=== T ===
- William Howard Taft, Secretary of War, President of the United States, and Chief Justice of the United States
- Uday Singh Taunque (1982–2003), US Army Soldier; received a Bronze Star and a Purple Heart for his service in Iraq War
- Dora E. Thompson, Army Nurse Corps superintendent during World War I, recipient of the Distinguished Service Medal
- John Tyler Jr. (1819–1896), son of President John Tyler; served as Private Secretary to his father, Confederate Assistant Secretary of War

=== V ===
- Thomas S. Vandal (1960–2018), U.S. Army Lieutenant General

=== W ===
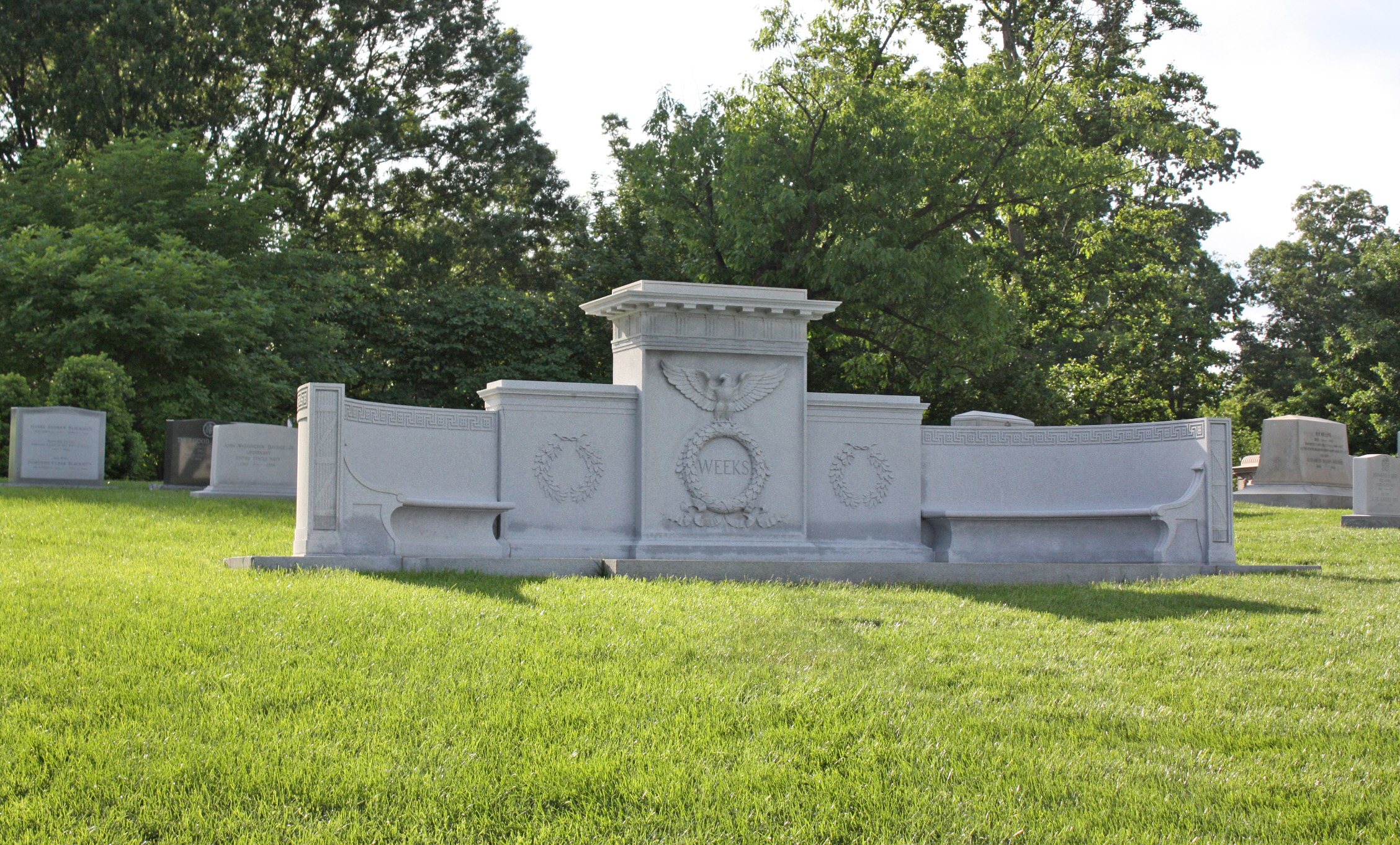
John W. Weeks, Secretary of War

- Earl Warren, Chief Justice of the United States
- Faustin E. Wirkus, Co-Monarch of the Kingdom of La Gonâve
- John W. Weeks, Secretary of War, US Senator and US Representative
- Joseph F. Weis Jr., World War II veteran and federal judge
- George Westinghouse, Civil War veteran, Westinghouse Electric founder
- Harvey W. Wiley, first Commissioner of the Food and Drug Administration; "father" of the Pure Food and Drug Act
- Charles Willeford, World War II veteran and author
- George M. Williamson, architect
- Charles Wilson, Texas congressman who aided in the success of Operation Cyclone during the Soviet–Afghan War
- Theodore Jonathan Wint, brigadier general, veteran of the Civil War, Indian Wars, Boxer Rebellion, and Spanish-American War.

=== Y ===
- Sid Yudain, journalist and founder of Roll Call

== Notable civilians ==
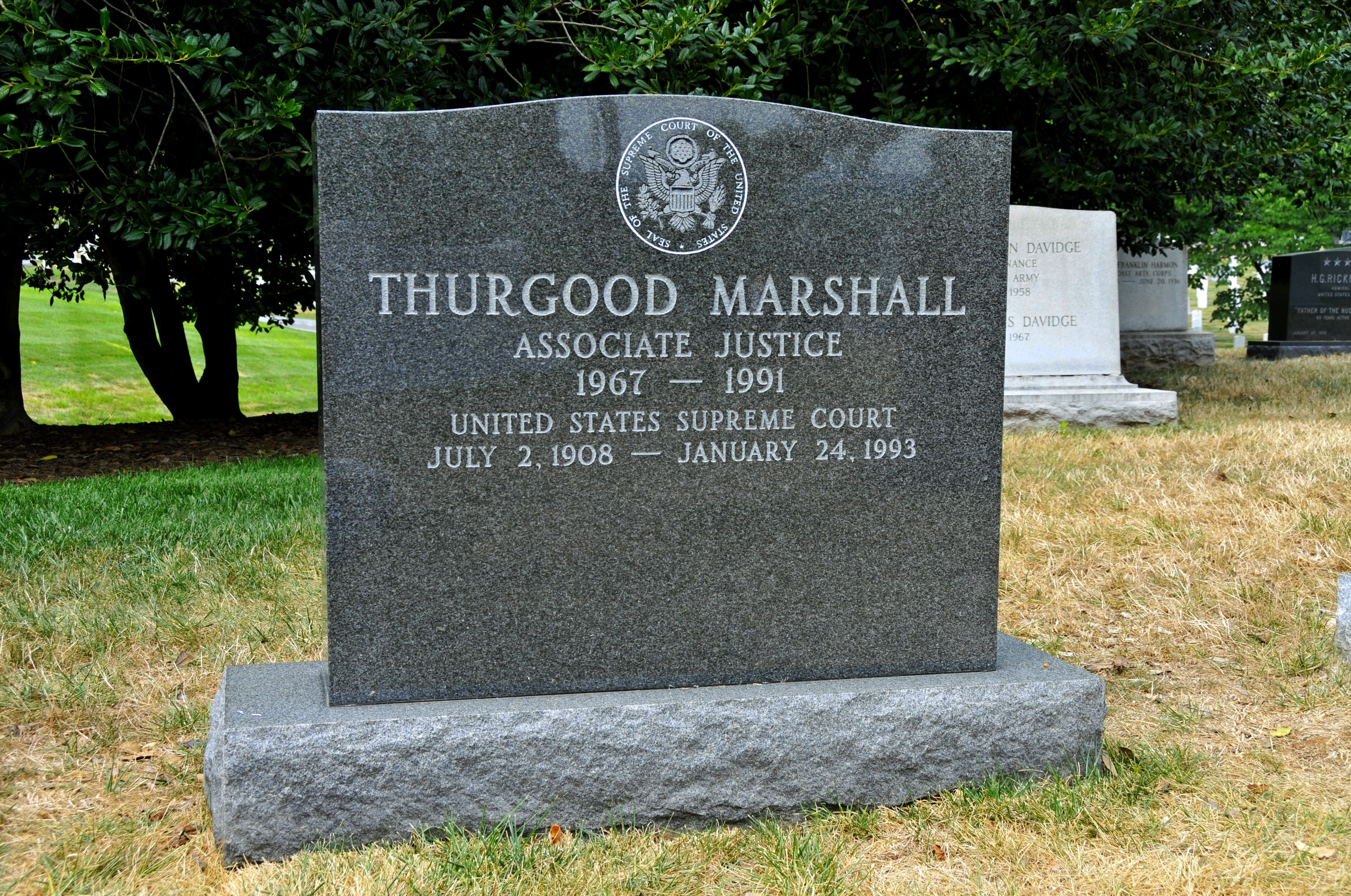
Thurgood Marshall, Associate Justice of the Supreme Court of the United States

=== B ===
- Fay Bainter, Oscar-winning Hollywood film actress. Buried with her husband, U.S. Navy officer Reginald Venable.
- Gretta Bader, sculptor, buried with her husband, William B. Bader
- Constance Bennett, Hollywood film actress, buried with her husband, Brigadier General Theron John Coulter
- Charles W. Berry (1871–1941), New York City Comptroller; also a soldier
- Harry Blackmun, Associate Justice of the Supreme Court of the United States
- William Brennan, Associate Justice of the Supreme Court of the United States
- Warren E. Burger, Chief Justice of the United States

=== C ===
- Elizabeth Brownrigg Henderson Cotten (1875–1975), librarian, socialite, suffragist, daughter of Congressman John S. Henderson and wife of Lyman A. Cotten
- Thom Christopher (1940–2024), actor
- Bill Clay (1931–2025), American civil rights advocate
- Leslie Coffelt (1910–1950), White House police officer killed fighting off would-be assassins of President Harry S. Truman in the 1950 assassination attempt at Blair House
- George Washington Parke Custis, founder of Arlington Plantation; grandson of Martha Washington; step-grandson and adopted son of President George Washington; father to Mary Anna Custis Lee
- Mary Lee Fitzhugh Custis, wife to George Washington Parke Custis; daughter of William Fitzhugh and Ann Bolling Randolph Fitzhugh; mother to Mary Anna Custis Lee

=== D ===
- William O. Douglas, Associate Justice of the Supreme Court of the United States

=== E ===
- Joe Engle, American astronaut
- Medgar Evers, American civil rights activist, Mississippi's field secretary for the NAACP, and a World War II veteran who served in the United States Army

=== F ===
- Lena Santos Ferguson (1928–2004), secretary for the United States Department of the Navy and second African-American member of the Daughters of the American Revolution.
- Elizebeth Friedman, noted cryptanalyst who broke thousands of ciphers during the Prohibition Era and World Wars, trained first group of WWI cryptologists. Buried with husband William Friedman.

=== G ===
- John Gibson (1956–1998), United States Capitol Police officer killed in the 1998 Capitol shooting attack
- Eunice Renshaw Geiger (1893–1982) – American First Lady of Guam.
- John Glenn (1921–2016), the first American astronaut to orbit the Earth and his wife Annie (1920–2020); John was also a Marine veteran.
- Ruth Bader Ginsburg (1933–2020), Associate Justice of the Supreme Court of the United States and her husband Martin D. (1932–2010), who worked as a law professor
- Arthur Goldberg, Associate Justice of the Supreme Court of the United States
- Elizabeth Jeter Greene (1890–1973), African American suffragist and civic leader.

=== H ===
- Anna Sanborn Hamilton (1848–1927), co-founder, president, League of American Pen Women
- Elizabeth Hanson (CIA officer) (1979–2009) killed in Camp Chapman attack
- Matthew Henson (1866–1955), first African-American to seek the North Pole
- Juliet Opie Hopkins (1818–1890), "Florence Nightingale of the South"

=== K ===
- Arabella Kennedy (1956), infant daughter of Jacqueline and John F. Kennedy
- Ethel Kennedy (1928–2024), wife of Robert F. Kennedy
- Jacqueline Kennedy Onassis (1929–1994), First Lady of the United States (1961–1963), wife of John F. Kennedy
- Patrick Bouvier Kennedy (1963–1963), infant son of Jacqueline and John F. Kennedy
- Phyllis Kirk (1927–2006), TV and film actress; buried alongside her husband, Warren V. Bush (Sgt., US Air Force)
- Henry Kissinger (1923–2023), Secretary of State 1973–1977

=== L ===
- Priscilla Lane (1915–1995), film actress. Interred alongside her husband Colonel Joseph A. Howard. He served in the US Air Force and later the Air Force Reserves.
- Mary Harlan Lincoln (1846–1937), wife of Robert Todd Lincoln, daughter of Senator James Harlan

=== M ===
- Thurgood Marshall (1908–1993), Associate Justice of the Supreme Court of the United States
- Roberta McCain (1912–2020), wife of John S. McCain Jr.
- Anita Newcomb McGee (1864–1940), woman doctor, founder of Army Nurse Corps
- Robert McNamara (1916–2009), Secretary of Defense 1961–1968
- Hooper S. Miles (1895–1964), politician and lawyer from Maryland
- Edmund Muskie (1914–1996), politician; Secretary of State 1980–1981
- Jane Muskie (1927–2004), First Lady of Maine

=== O ===
- Maureen O'Hara (1920–2015), actress, interred as Maureen FitzSimons Blair alongside her husband, Brigadier General Charles F. Blair Jr. US Air Force Reserve.

=== P ===
- James Parks (1843–1929), freedman, the only person buried at Arlington Cemetery who was born on the grounds
- Marie Ahnighito Peary (1893–1978), writer, daughter of famous polar explorers Robert and Josephine Peary

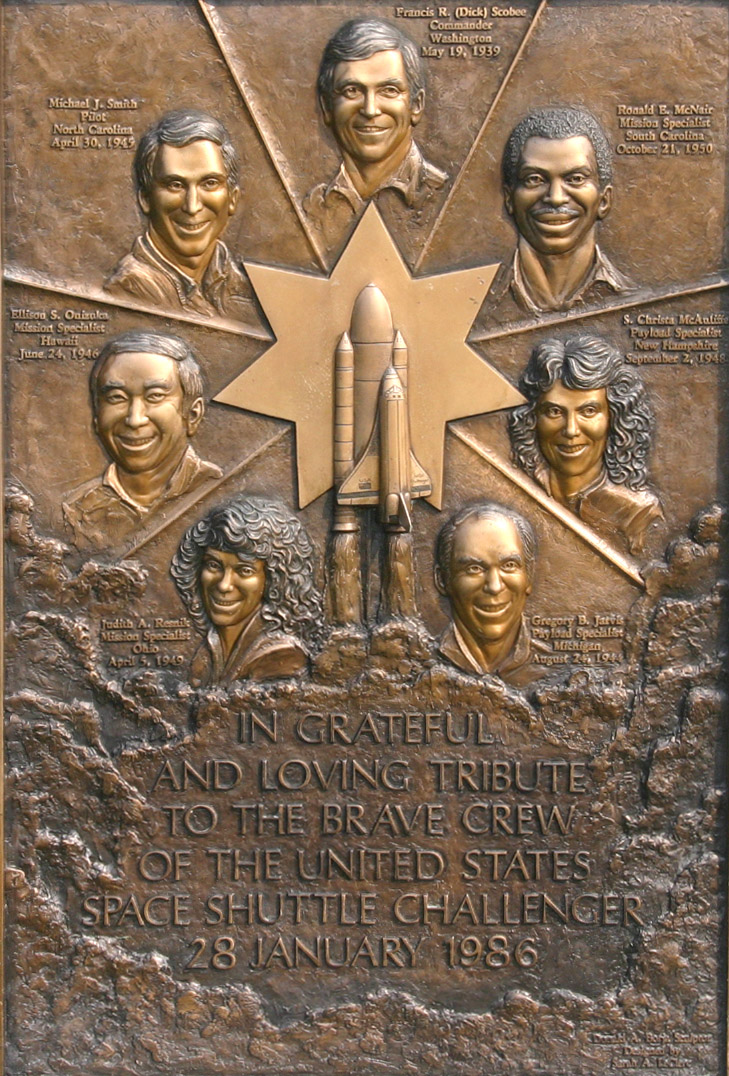
Front face of the Space Shuttle Challenger Memorial in Arlington National Cemetery

=== R ===
- Mary Randolph (1762–1828), first person buried at Arlington Plantation; descendant of Pocahontas and John Rolfe; cousin to Mary Lee Fitzhugh Custis
- Marie Teresa Rios (1917–1999), author of Fifteenth Pelican, basis for The Flying Nun television show

=== S ===
- Diana Sowle (1930–2018), actress
- Frederick W. Smith (1944–2025), founder of FedEx, Vietnam veteran.

=== T ===
- Helen Herron Taft (1861–1943), First Lady of the United States (1909–1913), wife of William Howard Taft
- Lydia H. Tilton (1839–1915), lyricist, "Old Glory", the national song of the Daughters of the American Revolution

== Other ==
Remains of the Space Shuttle Challenger's crew are interred in Section 46, including four civilians and three military members. Challenger astronaut Judith Resnik is memorialized with a cenotaph.

Five state funerals have been held at Arlington: those of U.S. presidents William Howard Taft and John F. Kennedy, that of General of the Armies John J. Pershing, that of U.S. Senator Edward M. Kennedy and his brother Senator Robert F. Kennedy.
