= List of people from Wilmington, Delaware =

The following people were all born in, residents of, or otherwise closely associated with the American city of Wilmington, Delaware.

== A-C ==
- Israel Acrelius (1714–1800), Lutheran clergyman
- John Backus (1924–2007), computer scientist, Fortran inventor, Turing Award laureate
- Bertice Berry, comedian, sociologist, author, and former talk show host
- Valerie Bertinelli (born 1960), actress
- Ashley Biden (born 1981), fashion designer, social worker, daughter of President Joe Biden
- Beau Biden (1969–2015), former attorney general of Delaware; first son of President Joe Biden
- Hunter Biden (born 1970), lawyer, second son of President Joe Biden
- Jill Biden (born 1951), First Lady of the United States (2021–2025), Second Lady of the United States (2009–2017), wife of President Joe Biden
- Joe Biden (born 1942), 46th president of the United States (2021–2025), 47th vice president of the United States (2009–2017), and U.S. senator from Delaware (1973–2009)
- John Biggs Jr. (1895–1979), chief judge of the US Court of Appeals for the 3rd Circuit (1937–1965), senior judge of the US Court of Appeals for the 3rd Circuit (1965–1979), and judge for the US Court of Appeals for the 3rd Circuit (1937–1965)
- Lisa Blunt Rochester (born 1962), U.S. senator, U.S. congresswoman
- Charles Brandt, American investigator and writer
- David S. Breslow (1916–1995), industrial chemist
- David Bromberg (born 1945), musician
- Clifford Brown (1930–1956), jazz trumpeter
- John Wilson Bubb (1843–1922), US Army brigadier general, retired in Wilmington
- Cab Calloway (1907–1994), musician, bandleader
- Henry Seidel Canby (1878–1961), critic, editor, Yale University professor
- John Carney (born 1956), mayor of Wilmington, Delaware (2025–present), governor of Delaware (2017–2025), US representative (2011–2017)
- Thomas J. Capano (1949–2011), prominent city lawyer convicted of murder
- Charles I. Carpenter (1906–1994), first chief of chaplains of the U.S. Air Force
- Tom Carper (born 1947), U.S. senator from Delaware (2001–2025), governor of Delaware (1993–2001), U.S. congressman, state treasurer
- Kathleen Cassello (1958–2017), opera singer
- Christopher Castellani (born 1972), writer
- Cesidio Colasante (born 1975), soccer player
- Chris Coons (born 1963), U.S. senator, New Castle County executive, New Castle County councilor
- Edwin Hyland Cooper (1881–1948), news reporter and official cameraman with the U.S. Signal Corps in World War I
- William Coyne, DuPont Company executive

== D-G ==
- Victor DelCampo (born 1977), bodybuilding champion
- William Devonshire (1969–2022), serial killer
- Simon Diamond (born 1968), retired professional wrestler and baseball player
- Elena Delle Donne (born 1989), professional basketball player
- John Dossett (born 1958), stage and film actor
- William C. Drinkard (1929–2008), scientist, inventor
- Sara Dylan (born 1939), former actress and model; first wife of singer-songwriter Bob Dylan
- Mark Eaton (born 1977), professional hockey player
- Herbert S. Eleuterio (1927–2022), scientist, inventor
- Raul Esparza (born 1970), actor
- Bill Fleischman (1939–2019), sports journalist and professor
- John Gallagher Jr. (born 1984), musician, performer, actor
- James Garretson (1828–1895), "father of oral surgery"
- Kyle Evans Gay (born 1986), lieutenant governor of Delaware (2025–present)
- Andrew Gemmell (born 1991), open water swimmer
- Charles Gilpin (1809–1891), mayor of Philadelphia (1851–1854)
- Barbara Gittings (1932–2007), prominent activist for LGBT equality
- Paul Goldschmidt (born 1987), baseball player
- Joan Goodfellow (born 1950), film, TV, and stage actress; mezzo-soprano
- Joey Graham (born 1982), power forward for Denver Nuggets
- Stephen Graham (born 1982), small forward for Charlotte Bobcats
- Dallas Green (1934–2017), baseball player, manager, executive
- Niem Green (born 1982), businessperson

== H-M ==
- Dionna Harris (born 1968), softball player, 1996 Olympic gold medalist
- Henry Heimlich (1920–2016), thoracic surgeon, medical researcher; widely credited as the inventor of the Heimlich maneuver
- Bankson T. Holcomb Jr. (1908–2000), Marine Corps brigadier general, cryptanalyst and linguist during World War II
- Charles Hope (born 1970), NFL player
- Cisco Houston (1918–1961), singer-songwriter
- Bones Hyland (born 2000), NBA player
- Steven Ittel (born 1946), scientist
- Henrietta R. Johnson (1914–1997), first African American woman to serve in the Delaware General Assembly
- Arturs Krišjānis Kariņš (born 1964), prime minister of Latvia, businessman, linguist
- Lisa C. Klein (born 1951), engineer, distinguished professor, Rutgers University
- Ellen J. Kullman (born 1956), former CEO of DuPont
- Stephanie Kwolek (1923–2014), chemist, invented Kevlar
- Richard Lankford (1914–2003), U.S. congressman
- Jennifer Leigh (born 1983), professional poker player
- Edward L. Loper Sr. (1916–2011), painter
- John Mabry (born 1970), baseball player
- Bob Marley (1945–1981), musician, lived in Wilmington
- Stephen Marley (born 1972), musician
- John P. Marquand (1893–1960), 20th-century author, novelist
- Luke Matheny (born 1976), Oscar-winning director of God of Love
- Sarah McBride (born 1990), U.S. representative, state senator, LGBT rights activist, and national press secretary of the Human Rights Campaign
- Bill McGowan (1896–1954), Baseball Hall of Fame umpire
- Robert Milligan McLane (1815–1898), U.S. congressman
- Marshall Kirk McKusick (born 1954), computer scientist, author
- Tom Mees (1949–1996), sports broadcaster
- Kevin Mench (born 1978), professional baseball player
- Meagan Miller, opera singer
- Roxanne Modafferi (born 1982), professional women's mixed martial artist

== N-S ==
- Mary Nash (1924–2020), writer
- Garrett Neff, model
- Helen Palmatary (1884–1976), anthropologist
- Katina Parker, filmmaker and photographer
- George Parshall (1929–2019), scientist
- Peppermint (c. 1979), drag queen
- Samuel Peterson (c. 1639–1689), one of the founders of Wilmington
- Daniel Pfeiffer (born 1975), political activist, podcaster
- Aubrey Plaza (born 1984), actress
- Pete du Pont (1935–2021), governor of Delaware, U.S. congressman
- Keith Powell (c. 1979), actor, director
- Bill Press (born 1940), author, commentator
- Howard Pyle (1853–1911), author, illustrator
- Joe Pyne (1924–1970), broadcaster
- Judge Reinhold (born 1957), actor
- Betty Roche (1918–1999), singer in Duke Ellington Orchestra, jazz vocalist
- Jane Richards Roth (born 1935), senior judge for the US Court of Appeals for the Third Circuit (2006–present), judge for the US Court of Appeals for the Third Circuit (1991–2006), and judge for the US District Court for the District of Delaware (1985–1991)
- William Roth (1921–2003), U.S. senator
- Will Sheridan (born 1985), Villanova basketball player, rapper, LGBT pioneer
- Matthew Shipp (born 1960), avant-garde pianist
- Andrew Shue (born 1967), actor
- Elisabeth Shue (born 1963), actress
- Brian Smith (born 1979), NCAA and NFL Football coach and former player
- Susan Stroman (born 1954), Broadway and film director, choreographer
- Frederick Douglass Stubbs (1906–1947), pioneering Black thoracic surgeon
- John A. H. Sweeney (1930–2007), museum curator and author

== T-Z ==
- Din Thomas (born 1976), mixed martial arts fighter
- Sean Patrick Thomas (born 1970), actor
- George Thorogood (born 1950), blues/rock musician
- Chadwick A. Tolman (1938–2024), scientist
- Reorus Torkillus (1608–1643), Lutheran minister to New Sweden
- Don A. J. Upham (1809–1877), mayor of Milwaukee
- Tom Verlaine (1949–2023), rock musician
- Rick Wagoner (born 1953), former chairman and chief executive officer of General Motors
- Mary T. Wales (1874–1952), co-founder of Johnson and Wales University, born in Wilmington
- Herta Ware (1917–2005), stage and screen actress, political activist, wife of Will Geer
- Gloria Warren (1926–2021), actress
- Joey Wendle (born 1990), baseball player
- Randy White (born 1953), NFL Hall of Famer
- Kathleen Widdoes (born 1939), actress
- Chris Widger (born 1971), baseball player
- Young Guru (born 1974), audio engineer, record producer, disc jockey, record executive; Gimel Androus Keaton by birth
- Aleksandra Ziolkowska-Boehm (born 1949), author
