= Viola B. Sanders =

American naval officer (1921–2013)

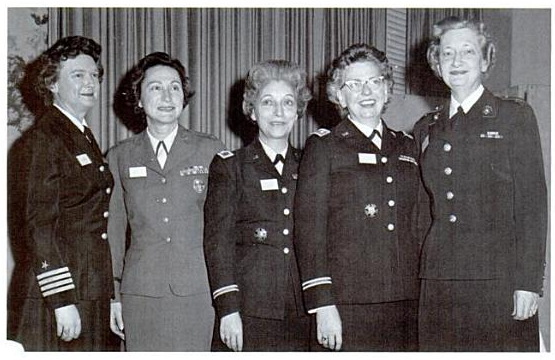
Left to right: Capt. Viola B. Sanders, WAVES; Col. Elizabeth Ray, Women in the Air Force, Col. Emily C. Gorman, WAC; Colonel Kelly, and Col. Margaret M. Henderson, Women Marines, 3 January 1963.

Viola Brown Sanders (born February 21, 1921 – April 28, 2013) was an American naval officer who served as deputy director of Women in the Navy from 1958 to 1960, and in 1962 was appointed as the sixth director of Women in the Navy (Assistant Chief of Naval Personnel for Women).

== Biography ==
Captain Viola B. Sanders, born 21 February 1921 in Sidon, Mississippi, is the daughter of John S. and Viola Brown Sanders. She graduated from Greenwood High School and went on to attend Sunflower Junior College (now Mississippi Delta Community College) in Moorhead, Mississippi, for two years. In 1941, she received a BS in education from Delta State Teachers College (now Delta State University) in Cleveland, Mississippi, and was later chosen as the college's first outstanding alumna. She then taught grades seven to twelve in Glen Allan, Mississippi.

Sanders enlisted in the WAVES in March 1943. She attended Officer Candidate School at Smith College in Massachusetts, and completed communications training at nearby Mount Holyoke College. On October 19, 1943, she was assigned as communications officer at Naval Air Station in New Orleans, Louisiana, where she remained throughout the remainder of the war. She was transferred to Naval Station Great Lakes, where she worked in recruit training. When women's recruit training was transferred to United States Naval Training Center Bainbridge, Maryland, in late 1951, Sanders was assigned to set up the facilities for the women's regiment. After completing the move, she became the regimental commander in Bainbridge, a position she held for a year.

In 1953, Sanders was sent abroad to Naval Supply Depot, Yokosuka, Japan, where she served as a naval intelligence officer. She returned to the U.S. in 1955 as administrative officer for U.S. Antarctic Programs, and aided in the office of Rear Admiral Richard Evelyn Byrd in Washington, D.C. In 1958, she was asked to be deputy director for Winifred Quick Collins, the Director of Women in the Navy. She later worked with the Naval Reserve at Norfolk, Virginia, for a year. She was called back to Washington to serve as Director of Women in the Navy in 1962. Sanders retired from the Navy on August 31, 1966.

== Retirement ==
After her retirement Sanders lived in Southern Pines, North Carolina, for a short time before returning to Greenwood, Mississippi, where she was very active in civic and veterans affairs.

== Notes ==
Military offices
Preceded by Winifred Collins	Assistant Chief of Naval Personnel for Women; 1962 – 1966	Succeeded by Rita Lenihan
