= Rita Lenihan =

United States Navy officer (1914–1989)

- Born: 1914; Monroe, New York
- Died: November 23, 1989 (age 75); Bethesda, Maryland
- Military career
- Allegiance: United States
- Branch: United States Navy
- Service years: 1943–1970
- Rank: Captain
- Conflicts: World War II
- Awards: Legion of Merit
- Other work: Regent of Georgetown University

Captain Rita Lenihan (1914 – November 23, 1989) was an officer in the United States Navy. She served as Director of the WAVES and Assistant Chief of Naval Personnel for Women from 1966 to 1970.

== Early life ==
Lenihan was born in Monroe, New York in 1914. She studied at the College of Saint Elizabeth in New Jersey where she majored in Latin. This knowledge would be used by her to devise the motto for the WAVES: Honoris Est Nobis Navare Navales, which translates from Latin as It is an honor for us to serve the fleet. She then attended the Graduate School of Columbia University where she studied classics.

== Military career ==
Lenihan received officer training at the United States Naval Reserve Midshipmen's School at Smith College, Northampton, Massachusetts. Upon graduation, she was commissioned into the WAVES division of the United States Navy as an ensign in 1943. She was assigned to the Bureau of Naval Personnel. In 1949, she was posted to London, England, as Aide to the Chief of the Joint Planning Staff of the Commander in Chief, Naval Forces, Eastern Atlantic and Mediterranean. She returned to the USA and joined the Potomac River Naval Command as Director of Officer Personnel.

She served as officer in charge of the WAVES Officer School in Newport, Rhode Island. From 1959 to 1961, she was based at the Bureau of Naval Personnel where served as coordinator for the Navy Enlisted Scientific Education Program and as administrator of the Naval Academy Preparatory School. Promoted to commander, she was Deputy Director of the WAVES from 1961 to 1963. She joined the staff of the Naval War College. In 1966, she was appointed Assistant Chief of Naval Personnel and Director of the Waves.

She retired from the military in 1970.

== Later life ==
In 1972, Lenihan joined the Georgetown University Board of Regents. She served as Chair from 1975 to 1978.

She died on November 23, 1989. She had been suffering from cancer and was receiving treatment at the National Naval Medical Center in Bethesda, Maryland.

== Honors and decorations ==
Lenihan was a recipient of the Legion of Merit. In March 1967, Georgetown University awarded her its Annual Alumni Achievement Award 'for her significant contribution to the betterment of the community and the nation'. She was awarded an honorary Doctor of Laws degree in May 1967 by the College of Saint Elizabeth.

Military offices
Preceded by Viola B. Sanders	Assistant Chief of Naval Personnel for Women; 1966 – 1970	Succeeded by Robin L. Quigley
