= James Parks (freed slave) =

- Born: 1843; Arlington, Virginia, US
- Died: August 21, 1929 (aged 85–86); Arlington, Virginia US
- Burial place: Arlington National Cemetery
- Military career
- Allegiance: United States
- Branch: United States Army
- Service years: 1861–1929
- Nickname: Uncle Jim

James Parks (1843 – August 21, 1929) was a freed slave who is prominently buried in Arlington National Cemetery and is the only person buried there who was born on the grounds.

He was born a slave but was later freed by his owner and continued to work at the cemetery as a grave digger. He helped historians locate some of the buildings and landmarks that existed prior to the establishment of Arlington National Cemetery such as the slave cemetery, roads and other key locations.

He died at Freedman's Village in Arlington, Virginia and was granted special permission to be buried at Arlington by the Secretary of War.

== Biography ==
Parks was born a slave on March 19, 1843, in Arlington, Virginia to Lawrence Parks and Patsy Clark.

The first graves in Arlington National Cemetery were dug by James Parks, a former Arlington Estate slave. Parks was freed in 1862 under the terms of the will of his former owner, George Washington Parke Custis. He still lived on Arlington Estate when Secretary of War Edwin M. Stanton signed the orders designating Arlington as a military burial ground. Parks served in the U.S. Army from 1861 to 1929 by working as a grave digger and maintenance man for the cemetery.

Prior to his death Jim Parks gave specific locations for the wells, springs, slave quarters, the slave cemetery, dance pavilion, old roads, icehouse, blacksmith shop, and kitchens. He stated that all of his grandparents and parents were buried in the slave cemetery. At the time the article was written, the Department of Agriculture was in the process of uprooting the sacred ground for a farming area. It is not known what happened to the bodies interred in the slave cemetery.

At the time of his death he left behind one of the few slave accounts on record from which much of the restoration of Arlington House was based. His testimony provided a complete record of the people who inhabited the plantation, the slaves and the Custis-Lee family.

When Parks died on August 21, 1929, the Secretary of War Dwight Filley Davis granted special permission for him to be buried at Arlington National Cemetery with full military honors. He was buried at Arlington National Cemetery with full military honors.

== See also ==
- List of people buried at Arlington National Cemetery
