= Winifred Collins =

United States Navy officer (1911–1999)

- Born: November 26, 1911; Great Falls, Montana
- Died: May 5, 1999 (aged 87); Hospice of Northern Virginia
- Burial place: Arlington National Cemetery
- Military career
- Allegiance: United States of America
- Branch: United States Navy
- Service years: 1942–1962
- Rank: Captain
- Conflicts: World War II
- Awards: Bronze Star Medal; Legion of Merit

Winifred Quick Collins (November 26, 1911 – May 5, 1999) was Chief of Naval Personnel for Women in the United States Navy, and Director of the WAVES (Women Accepted for Volunteer Emergency Service) from 1957 to 1962.

== Early life ==
She was born Winifred Mary Redden, in Great Falls, Montana, United States. She was the third child of four of Daniel A. Redden and Mary Winifred Redden (maiden name Farrell). When Collins was 10 years old, her family moved to Missoula, Montana, to run a hotel. A year later her parents divorced. When she was 11, she contracted a mild case of polio, but fully recovered without suffering a lasting disability. Soon after this her mother abandoned her, and she spent the next few years living with relatives in various locations. After attending High School in four different states, Collins graduated in 1929 while living in Seattle with one of her brothers. In 1930 she received a scholarship from the Brunswig Drug Corporation to attend the University of Southern California. She graduated with a major in business, in 1935. It was in 1935 that she married her first husband Roy Quick. Also in that year, Collins got a job as the Personnel manager of Brunswig Drug Corporation. She recommended a number of changes to the president of the company; she suggested that the employees should be paid according to their performance and job type, regardless of gender. Because of the subsequent improvement in productivity Collins was financed, in 1937, to attend the Harvard-Radcliffe Training Course in Personnel Administration. In 1938, she was one of five who graduated from the first course.

== Military career ==
Dr. Ada Comstock, the president of Radcliffe College when Collins was educated there, sat on a committee that was looking into the idea of recruiting women into the US Navy. She contacted Collins in June 1942 with a suggestion that she might apply for a commission. On August 4 of that year, Collins graduated from the first female commissioning class held at Smith College, Northampton, Massachusetts, and was commissioned with the rank of ensign on August 28, 1942.

After the month-long training at Smith College, the commanding officer of the Naval Officer School, Captain Underwood, requested that she would stay on as the Personnel Director. Two months later, she was promoted to Lieutenant (junior grade). Her next assignment was in the summer of 1943; she was sent to the Bureau of Naval Personnel in Washington, D.C. She was one of twelve Naval officers tasked with the evaluation of the jobs the WAVES could do within the Navy as a whole, and the skills they would require to do them.

In late 1944, the now Lieutenant Collins was the first female non-medical officer to serve outside the Continental United States when she was sent to Hawaii as the District Personnel Officer. She organised accommodation for 5,000 WAVES who were going to be posted there in January 1945. At the end of World War II, Collins was tasked with the demobilization of the WAVES and their reintroduction into civilian life. For this, she was promoted to lieutenant commander, and was awarded the Bronze Star Medal.

In 1946, Collins returned to Washington DC and helped plan the eventual inclusion of females into the Navy; this led to the 1948 Women's Armed Forces Integration Act. On October 15, 1948, the first female Commissioned Officers of the United States Navy were sworn in; Collins was one of them. In 1951, she was then sent to Stanford University by the Navy for post graduate education and graduated in 1952 with a Master of Education. She then became the Assistant Director of Naval Personnel for the 12th Naval District; the area of the US comprising Nevada, Utah, and Northern California. In 1953 she was promoted to commander; one of only two female commanders in the entire US Navy. Between 1953 and 1956, Collins was personnel director of the 12th Naval District, and commanded 350 Navy personnel. This was the highest post ever held by a female officer in the Navy.

Her next post was to London, United Kingdom, as senior assistant to the Commander in Chief of Naval Forces (Eastern Atlantic and Mediterranean). Returning to the United States in the summer of 1957, she was appointed Chief of Naval Personnel for Women and promoted to the rank of captain. She was the only female captain, making her the most senior woman in the Navy, until she retired from service on August 31, 1962.

== Later life, death and legacy ==
Upon retirement from the navy, Collins became the first female director of the Military Officers Association of America in 1964, and the first female national vice president of the Navy League of the United States in 1965, and was later the director. The Navy League have an award named after her; the Captain Winifred Quick Collins Award. In 1977, she was elected as the first female director of Corn Products International, a global consumer food products operation. Further Navy related roles she filled include; the first female trustee of the United States Naval Academy Foundation, in 1977; the first women named in the Navy League's Hall of Fame in 1990.

Collins died at the Hospice of Northern Virginia on May 5, 1999, after suffering from spinal cancer. She was buried on May 25, 1999, in section 3 of the Arlington National Cemetery.

In 1973, the Navy League of the United States established an award in her honor called the Captain Winifred Quick Collins Awards for Inspirational Leadership presented to a woman officer and an enlisted woman for exceptional leadership and performance in their military duties.

== Personal life ==
Collins was married twice. She was married after she graduated from college to Roy T. Quick. Their marriage lasted from 1937 to 1941 when they divorced. In 1961, she married Rear Admiral Howard Lyman Collins. From her second marriage she had two step-sons; Howard Lyman Collins, Jr., and John Collins. Collins and her second husband are buried in Arlington National Cemetery.

== See also ==
- List of individuals buried at Arlington National Cemetery

Military offices
Preceded by Louise K. Wilde	Assistant Chief of Naval Personnel for Women; 1957–1962	Succeeded by Viola B. Sanders
