= Kareem Rashad Sultan Khan =

United States Army soldier (1987–2007)

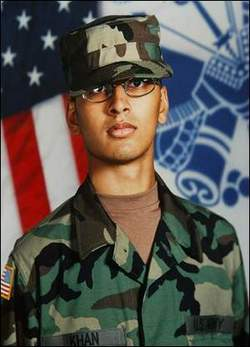
- United States Army portrait
- Born: February 12, 1987; Neptune, New Jersey, United States
- Died: August 6, 2007 (aged 20); Baqubah, Diyala Governorate, Iraq
- Burial place: Arlington National Cemetery, Virginia (full military honors)
- Military career
- Allegiance: United States
- Branch: United States Army
- Service years: 2005–2007
- Rank: Corporal
- Units: 1st Battalion, 23rd Infantry Regiment, 2nd Infantry Division
- Conflicts: Iraq War †
- Awards: Bronze Star Medal; Purple Heart

Kareem Rashad Sultan Khan (February 12, 1987 – August 6, 2007) was a United States Army specialist who was killed during Operation Iraqi Freedom. He is a recipient of the Bronze Star and Purple Heart for his service, and is buried in Arlington National Cemetery.

== Early life and education ==
Khan was born in Neptune, New Jersey to Trinidad and Tobago-born parents, Feroze Khan and Elsheba Khan of Indian descent. He was a 2005 graduate from Southern Regional High School in the Manahawkin section of Stafford Township, New Jersey.

== Army career ==
He enlisted in the U.S. Army following his graduation and was assigned to the 1st Battalion, 23rd Infantry Regiment, 3rd Brigade, 2nd Infantry Division (Stryker Brigade Combat Team), based in Fort Lewis, Washington. According to the Gannett News Service, Khan was motivated to enlist by the September 11 attacks on the World Trade Center, seeking to counter stereotypes about Muslims by demonstrating his commitment to the United States.

He was deployed to Iraq in July 2006. Khan and three other soldiers were killed when a bomb exploded while they were clearing a house—he was 20 years old. He was promoted posthumously to the rank of corporal.

== Legacy ==
His service was cited during an October 2008 interview on Meet the Press with General Colin Powell. In particular, Powell referred to a photograph in The New Yorker which showed Khan's mother by his gravestone in Arlington National Cemetery. Powell said that Khan's example refutes the anti-Muslim sentiment present in the Republican campaign during the 2008 U.S. Presidential election (q.v.), namely that being Muslim disqualifies a person from being a genuine, patriotic American, or that a Muslim could not become President.

== See also ==
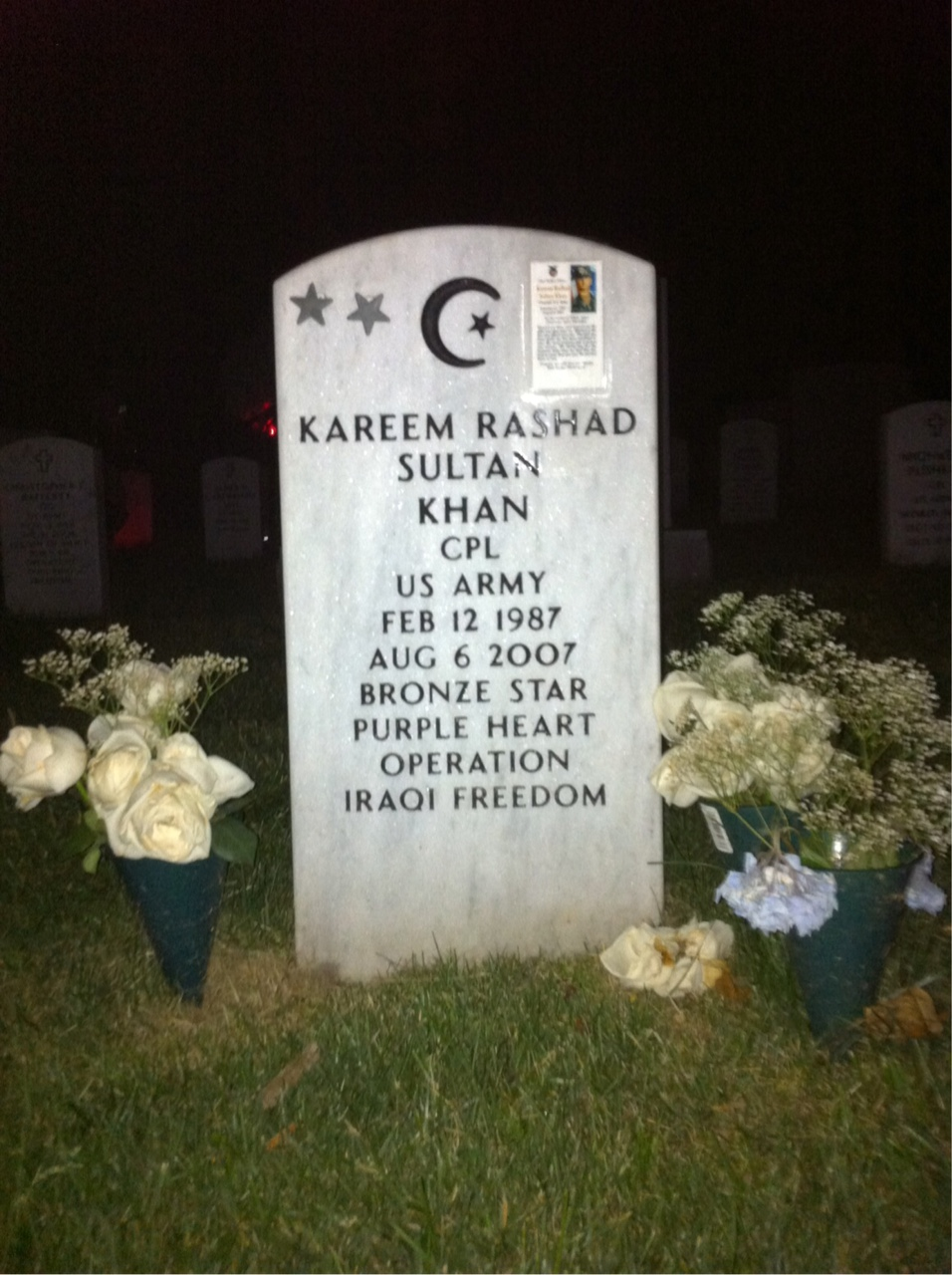
Grave at Arlington National Cemetery

- Humayun Khan, another Muslim soldier of the U.S. Army killed during Operation Iraqi Freedom whose service came up during the 2016 U.S. presidential election
