= Anton Hilberath =

- Born: 19 November 1898; Bad Neuenahr, Germany
- Died: 21 April 1946 (aged 47); Washington, D.C., United States
- Military career
- Allegiance: Weimar Republic; Nazi Germany
- Branch: Army
- Rank: Oberfeldwebel
- Conflicts: World War II

Anton Hilberath (19 November 1898 – 21 April 1946) was an Oberfeldwebel in the German Army during World War II. He is one of at least 830 German POWs, who died and were buried in the United States in accordance with the Geneva Convention. He is one of three Axis POWs and the only German POW in section 15 of Arlington National Cemetery.

Section 15 served as the de facto cemetery for Fort Myer Virginia at the time and was likely the closest to where the POWs died. Little is known of Anton Hilberath and it seems he was taken as a POW during the North African campaign.
