= Katina Parker =

American filmmaker

Katina Parker is an American filmmaker and photographer from Durham, North Carolina. She founded the mutual aid group Feed Durham during the COVID-19 pandemic.

== Early life and education ==
Parker grew up in Wilmington, Delaware. Her family included cooks and civil rights leaders, she had a Southern Baptist upbringing, and started taking pictures when she was ten. She graduated in speech communication and fine arts in film production.

== Work ==
Her 2012 photo exhibit One Million Strong documented the Million Man March and ten years of following events. The Triangle Tribune called her work "emotional and thoughtprovoking", saying she was able to "capture intimate moments at the right moment and at the right time". She filmed and co-produced Ferguson: A Report from Occupied Territory (2015), about the reactions to the 2014 Killing of Michael Brown. In 2017, she made the two-part film CALL:RESPONSE for Duke University. The subject was murders of Black Americans, and it was screened at a panel titled "Visualizing the Impact of Racial Violence".

Parker has been a media strategist for GLAAD, and worked as a teacher and consultant at Duke University.

== Feed Durham ==
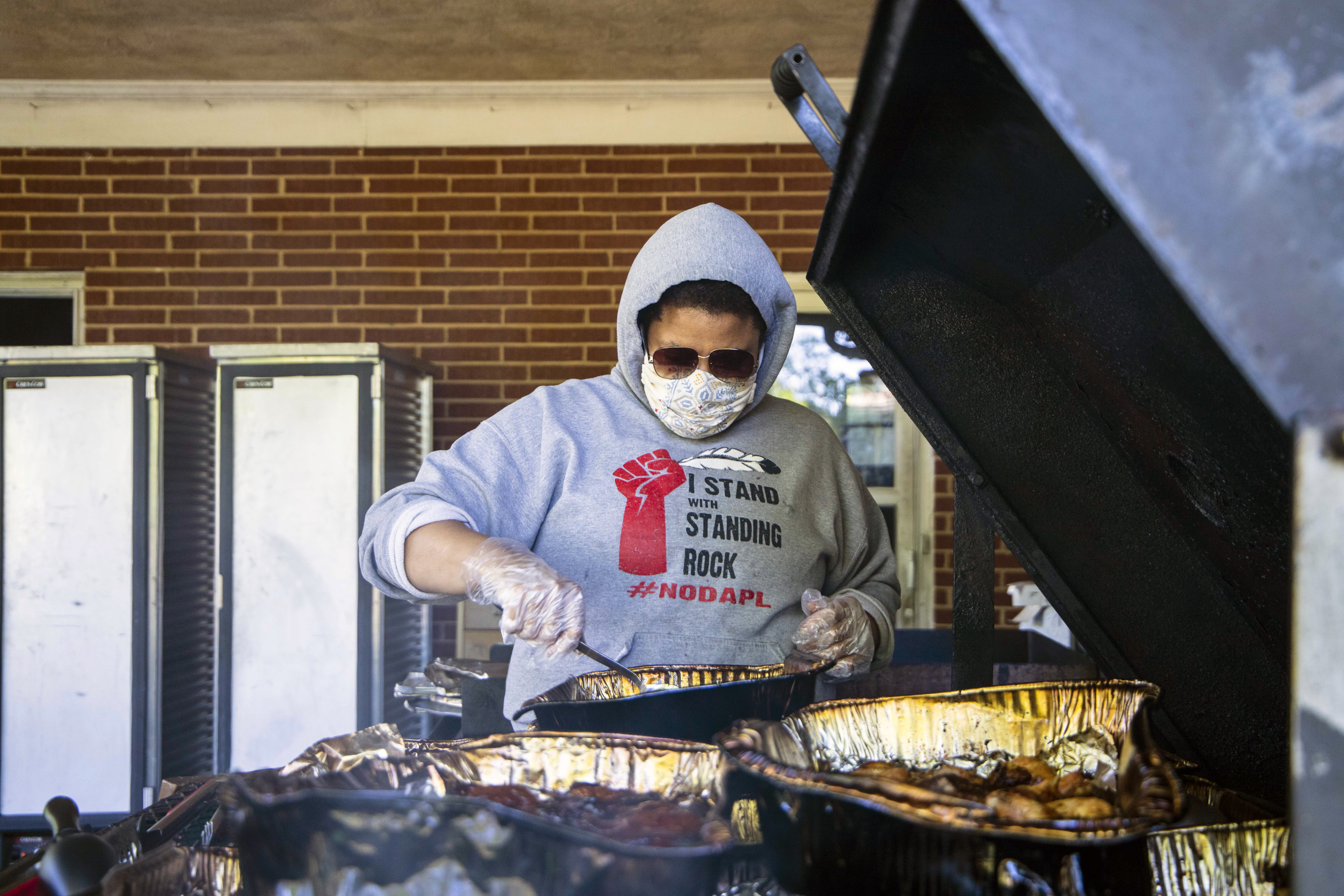
Katina Parker cooking in 2020

In April 2020, during the COVID-19 pandemic, Parker founded Feed Durham, calling it "a scrappy, determined mutual aid collective that came together in answer to mounting hunger in the Durham area". The group cooked food, offered it to people who could pick it up themselves and donated the rest to local charities. Indy Week called the effort "a model for direct crisis activism".

By December 2020 they had prepared 10,000 meals, and by March 2021 they had held seven cookouts, as well as raised over 100,000 dollars via GoFundMe. By November 2022, they had, according to Parker, helped feed 100,000 people with cooked food or groceries.

Feed Durham inspired similar programs in other cities. Parker and others documented the group's activities, and their work was presented in a 2023 art exhibit by the Durham Arts Council, "Lovingly Prepared by: A Multimedia Experience by Feed Durham."

== Personal life ==
As of 2020, she lives in Durham, North Carolina and has a daughter.
