= Ruth C. McGuire =

American plant pathologist

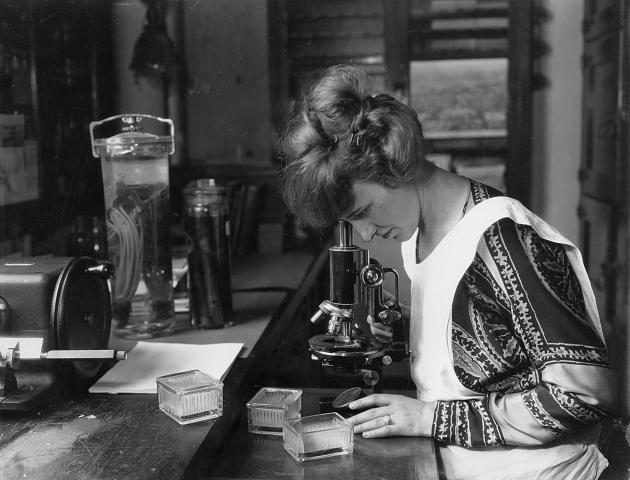
Ruth C. McGuire at work

Ruth Starrett McGuire (née Colvin; February 19, 1893 – September 2, 1950) was an American plant pathologist. She studied sugar cane diseases and sugarbeets.

== Early life and education ==
Ruth Colvin was born in 1893. She earned her B.A. in 1914 and her M.A. in 1916, both from Indiana University Bloomington. After earning her Master's, she worked as a high school teacher for three years. She never earned her Ph.D. but she took classes at numerous other schools including George Washington University, Northwestern University, and the University of Maryland. She was married to Francis Brenton Starrett (in 1925), and secondly, to Charles McGuire (in 1940).

== Career ==
McGuire started work at the United States Department of Agriculture. She retired with the title of Associate Cytologist. She did not stop working after retirement. She served as a research associate at the California Academy of Sciences from 1931 until 1942. While there, she studied the relationships between birds and insects. She also studied sugarcane, sugarbeets, bees, silkworms, beetles and mosquitoes. McGuire was a member of the Botanical Society of Washington, the Entomological Society of America, and the International Society of Sugar Cane Technologists.

== Death ==
A native of Flora, Indiana, McGuire died in 1950, aged 57, at a hospital in Silver Spring, Maryland, from undisclosed causes; she was survived by her husband and her brother. She is buried at Arlington National Cemetery.
