= Micheal E. Urell =

Irish-born soldier and Medal of Honor recipient (1844–1910)

Michael Emmet Urell
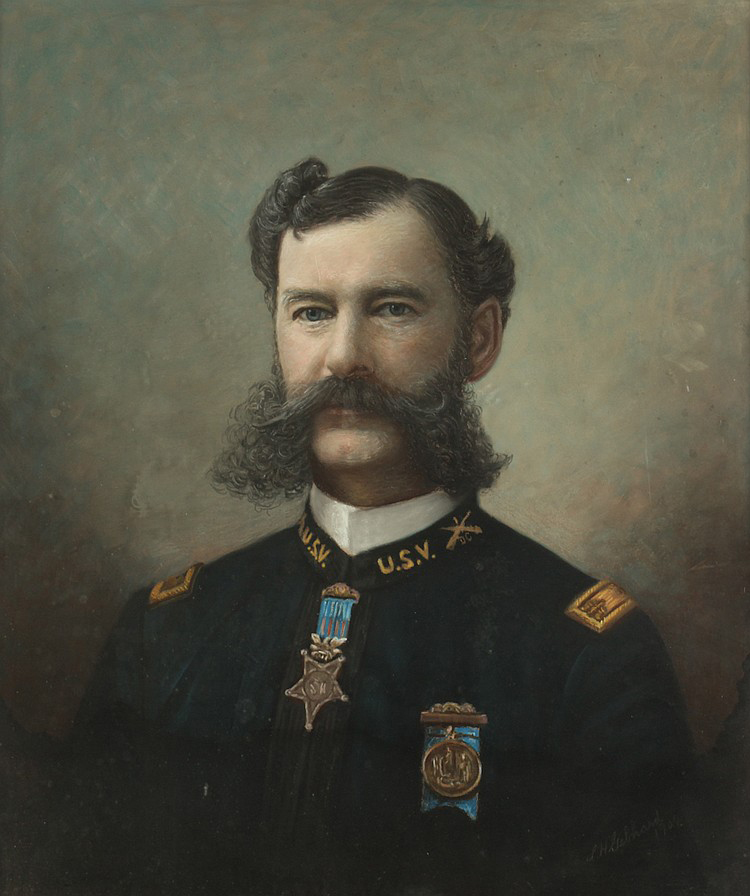
- Pastel portrait of M. Emmet Urell by Louis B. Gebhard (1904)
- Born: November 8, 1844; Nenagh, County Tipperary
- Died: September 6, 1910 (aged 65); County Cork, Ireland
- Burial place: Arlington National Cemetery
- Spouse: Isabel H. Urell (d. May 7, 1892)
- Military career
- Conflicts: American Civil War; First Battle of Bull Run; Battle of Fair Oaks; Battle of Bristoe Station; Spanish–American War; Siege of Santiago
- Awards: Medal of Honor

Micheal Emmet Urell (November 8, 1844 – September 6, 1910) was an Irish-born soldier in the Union Army during the American Civil War. He received the Medal of Honor for his service with the 82nd New York Volunteer Infantry.

== Biography ==
Urell was born in Nenagh, County Tipperary on November 8, 1844. (Note: The date of birth is disputed with some giving the 6th and others the 8th.) He earned the Medal of Honor for his actions at Bristoe Station whilst fighting as a Private with the 82nd New York Volunteer Infantry. He was promoted to Brevet Major later in the war. Urell served as a Major of the First Battalion of the District of Columbia National Guard throughout of the Spanish-American War. Upon the end of that war he was made Colonel of the Columbia National Guards Second Infantry. Urell was a prominent member of many veterans organizations, serving as Commander-in-chief of the Spanish War Veterans and as a department commander of the Grand Army of the Republic. Urell died in County Cork, Ireland on September 6, 1910, and his body was exhumed and brought back to America to be buried in Arlington National Cemetery.

== Medal of Honor citation ==
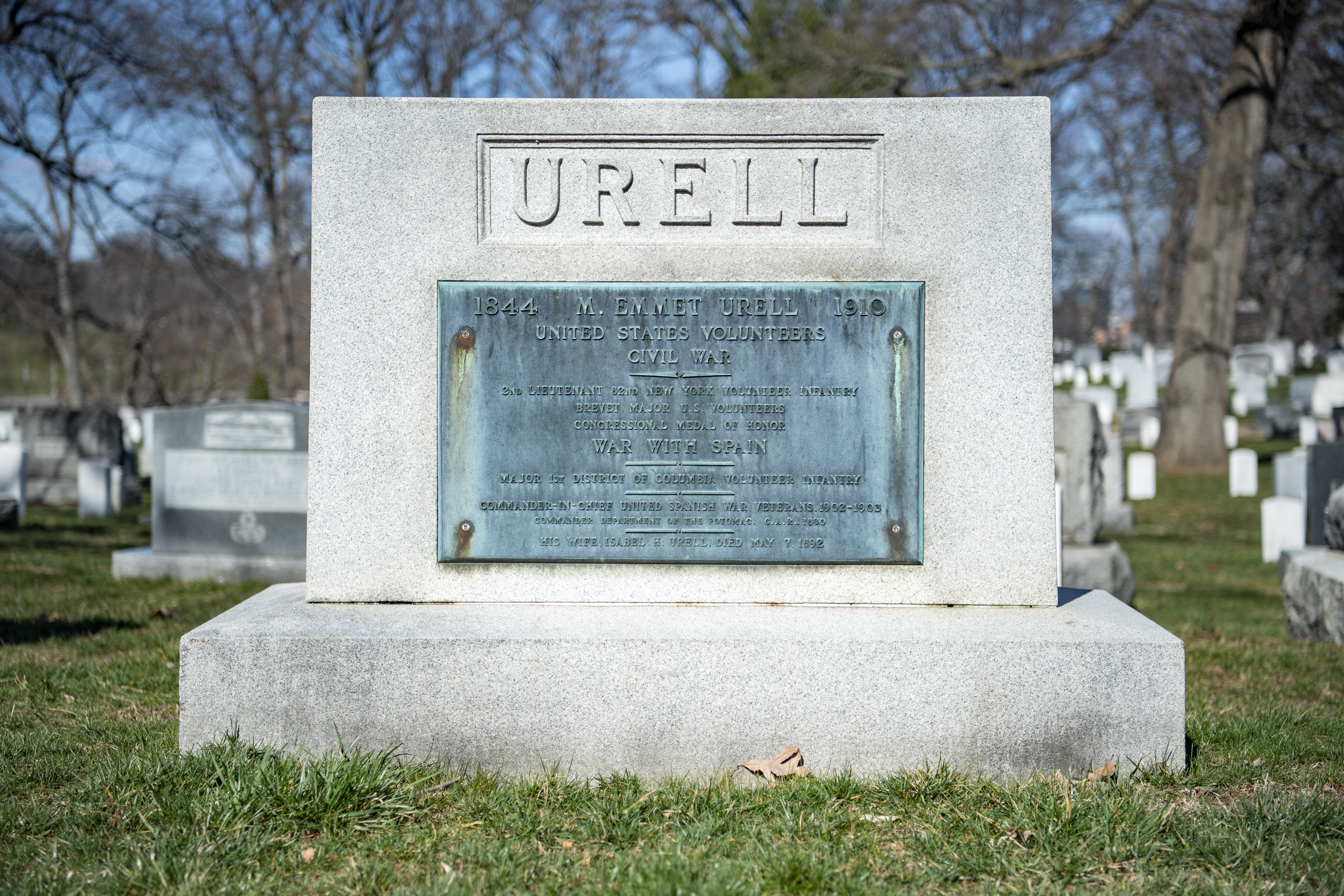
Grave at Arlington National Cemetery

For gallantry in action on 14 October 1863, while serving with Company E, 82d New York Infantry, in action at Bristoe Station, Virginia. While detailed as Color Bearer; Private Urell was severely wounded.

Date Issued: 6 June 1870

== Baseball ==
Marshall D. Wright's book, The National Association of Base Ball Players, 1857-1870, lists an "M. E. Urell" as having played top-level (for the time) baseball after the war. Urell played for the National and Union clubs in Washington, D.C. in 1866, for the Union club again in 1868, then with the Olympic club of Washington—by then a professional side—in 1869. He is listed as having played the outfield, third base and first base. Records are sketchy, but he appears to have been a mediocre batsman, with 108 hands lost (a player was given a "hand lost" every time he made an out at bat or on the bases) against 83 runs scored in 32 career games (in general, a good hitter would have more runs scored than hands lost).
