= Humayun Khan (soldier) =

United States Army officer (1976–2004)

- Born: 9 September 1976; Dubai, United Arab Emirates
- Died: 8 June 2004 (aged 27); Near Baqubah, Iraq
- Cause of death: Car bombing
- Resting place: Arlington National Cemetery; Arlington Co., Virginia, US
- Education: University of Virginia (2000)
- Parent: Khizr and Ghazala Khan
- Military career
- Branch: United States Army
- Years: 2000–2004
- Rank: Captain
- Unit: 1st Infantry Division
- Conflict: Iraqi insurgency

Humayun Saqib Muazzam Khan (9 September 1976 – 8 June 2004) was a United States Army officer who was killed by a suicide attack near Baqubah, Iraq during the Iraq War. He came to national attention in the United States during the 2016 presidential campaign as an example of a Muslim American soldier who died in service to the U.S. military.

Born in the United Arab Emirates to Pakistani parents, Khan moved to the U.S. with his family as a young boy. He attended the University of Virginia as a member of the Army Reserve Officers' Training Corps. Upon graduating in 2000, Khan was commissioned as a second lieutenant and entered active-duty service. By 2004, he had been promoted to captain and deployed with his unit for the Iraq War. On 8 June 2004, he was killed in a suicide attack and posthumously awarded the Purple Heart and the Bronze Star Medal. During the 2016 Democratic National Convention, his parents stood at the lectern and delivered a speech condemning then-U.S. presidential candidate Donald Trump's statements on Muslims.

== Personal life ==
On 9 September 1976, Humayun Saqib Muazzam Khan was born in Dubai to Khizr and Ghazala Khan, who originate from Punjab, Pakistan. They moved to the United States in 1980 and Humayun grew up in Silver Spring, Maryland. As a young child, Khan read extensively about Thomas Jefferson. In high school, he taught swimming to disabled children. Khan graduated from John F. Kennedy High School in 1996, and the University of Virginia in 2000. At the University of Virginia, Khan joined the university's Army Reserve Officers' Training Corps.

== Career ==
Khan joined the United States Army and had planned on becoming a military lawyer. According to his father, one of his personal heroes was Arizona senator and former prisoner of war John McCain. Khan achieved the rank of captain. In 2004, Khan was assigned to the Headquarters and Headquarters Company of the 201st Forward Support Battalion, 1st Infantry Division in Vilseck, Germany.

On 8 June 2004, 120 days into his tour of duty in Iraq, Khan was inspecting a guard post near Baqubah when a suspicious taxicab began approaching quickly. Ordering his subordinates away, Khan ran toward the vehicle and was killed when the bomb in it exploded. The car detonated before it could reach the installation gates or the nearby mess hall where hundreds of soldiers were eating. The blast also killed the two occupants of the vehicle and two Iraqi bystanders.

Khan's grave at Arlington National Cemetery bears the star and crescent, one of the official United States Department of Veterans Affairs emblems for headstones and markers, representing Muslim servicemembers.

On 15 June, Khan was buried at Arlington National Cemetery in Section 60, grave 7986. His grave became a frequent destination for visitors who left flowers, US flags, and letters of support.

== Legacy ==
The first University of Virginia graduate to die in combat since the Vietnam War, Khan was honored by two university ceremonies. Khan was also posthumously awarded the Bronze Star Medal and the Purple Heart. Khan was also honored by the Virginia General Assembly, which passed a resolution noting "with great sadness the loss of a courageous and patriotic American."

In December 2015, Hillary Clinton, a presidential candidate in the 2016 United States presidential election, spoke about Khan's service praising him as "the best of America".

In 2018, Representative Tom Garrett introduced a bill that would name a Charlottesville, Virginia post office after Khan. Both houses of the 115th United States Congress unanimously passed the bill, and President Trump signed it into law on 21 December 2018. A joint statement by Virginia senators, Tim Kaine and Mark Warner, said, "With the dedication of [the Captain Humayun Khan Post Office], we're showing the Khan family that we're forever grateful for his service and sacrifice for our country". The post office was officially renamed on 9 September 2019 during a ceremony attended by Kaine and other politicians.

=== 2016 Democratic National Convention ===
Khizr Khan's remarks during the 2016 Democratic National Convention

Khan's parents appeared at the 2016 Democratic National Convention, where his father, Khizr Khan, spoke of his dead son and rebuked the Republican presidential nominee, Donald Trump, for his statements about Muslims and his proposed policies concerning them. Trump criticized the appearance of Khan's parents at the Democratic Convention, and suggested that Khan's mother may not have been allowed to speak. Trump's comments about Khan's mother, Ghazala, sparked widespread condemnation and triggered her response as an op-ed in The Washington Post. On 31 July 2016, Ghazala Khan expressed her thoughts and said she had been too overcome by emotion at the convention to speak at the podium. She wrote, "Donald Trump said I had nothing to say. I do. My son Humayun Khan, an Army captain, died 12 years ago in Iraq. He loved America ..."

Republican leaders Speaker of the House Paul Ryan and Senate Majority Leader Mitch McConnell criticized Trump's comments. A strong rebuke came from US Senator John McCain from Arizona; the former presidential candidate said that Trump did not represent the ideals of the Republican Party and its leaders. Veterans of Foreign Wars followed with a statement saying, "Election year or not, the VFW will not tolerate anyone berating a Gold Star family member for exercising his or her right of speech or expression."

The Islamic State of Iraq and the Levant's online magazine Dabiq published a picture of Humayun Khan's headstone with the caption "Beware of Dying as an apostate" and urged its followers to "[r]eject these calls to disunity and come together."

== See also ==
- Donald Trump 2024 presidential campaign#Arlington National Cemetery incident – American political campaign
- Kareem Rashad Sultan Khan – United States Army soldier (1987–2007)
- Pakistani Americans#Military – Americans of Pakistani birth or descent
- Muslims in the United States military – Aspect of American military history
