= Edwin Hyland Cooper =

American war photographer and news reporter

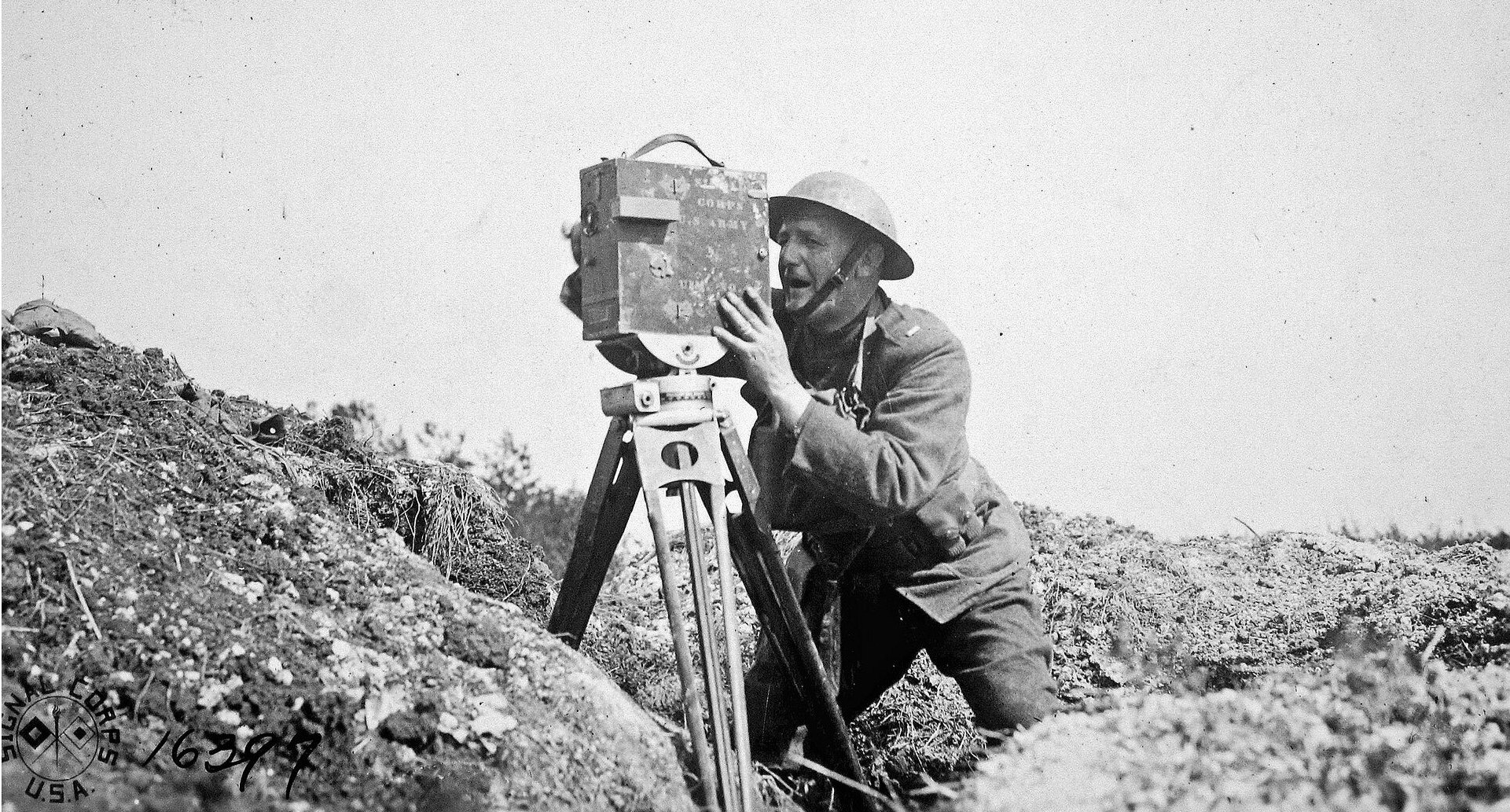
- Lt. Edwin Cooper operating movie camera in front line trenches, July 1918
- Born: April 8, 1881; Wilmington, Delaware, US
- Died: November 6, 1948 (aged 67); Keene, New Hampshire, US

Edwin Hyland Cooper (April 8, 1881 – November 6, 1948) was a photographic reporter and cinematographer who filmed the American attack on the German lines near Château-Thierry in July 1918. For his extraordinary bravery during this offensive, Lt. Cooper received the Distinguished Service Cross and Silver Star.

== Biography ==
Edwin H. Cooper was born in Wilmington, Delaware, on April 8, 1881. He started working as a photographer at an early age. Cooper joined the Lubin film studio around 1900, and from 1911 he worked with the celebrated photo artist William Rau, producing a pictorial history of the Pennsylvania Railroad. Before the outbreak of World War I Cooper had also taken up the movie camera, making travelogues in South America.

After the American entry into World War I, Cooper enlisted in the U.S. Signal Corps. He was one of the first photographic officers to arrive in France in October 1917 and cover the operations of the American Expeditionary Forces. As a lieutenant, he was responsible for the pictorial coverage of the 26th "Yankee" Division. On detached duty, he went into the trenches with the First Division and made one of the first pictures of American troops facing the Germans. He was the first man to be mentioned in the First Division's days communique, for making a photograph of no man's land in the American sector under fire.

Together with his photographic team, Cooper was in the front line trenches in July 1918, when the Americans made their first big push and attacked at Château-Thierry. On this occasion he arrested a group of Germans who reportedly mistook his movie camera for a machine-gun. Two of Cooper's men were wounded during this attack. Cooper was promoted to Captain in September 1918 when he was assigned to the 5th U.S. Army Corps as photographic officer. During the Meuse–Argonne offensive he was in charge of pictorial coverage for this U.S. Army corps.

Edwin Cooper was by all accounts a fearless aerial photographer. Because of his audacity he was admitted as a charter member of the Gimper Club at the 94th Aero Squadron. To join this club, one had to do a stunt or be a true ace. There is a picture of these club members, taken in the summer of 1918, showing Cooper together with his friend, the American ace Eddie Rickenbacker. Shortly before the end of the Great War Cooper filmed a staged battle between Rickenbacker inside a SPAD and a captured German Hannover biplane. Judging from a report in the trade press, Cooper must have qualified for the Gimper Club not because he had shot down German planes but as a result of his remarkable stunts: "To get a proper focus, he would climb out of his seat in an airplane, slide out to the tail of the machine, and there complete his work. His weight had caused the tail to dip, and the pilot had to loop the loop several times to save their lives", the Bulletin of Photography reported in October 1918.

Throughout his life Cooper remained active as a photographic reporter and lecturer. He served as a newspaper correspondent for the Christian Science Monitor and other papers. In 1939, he was sent by the American Olympic Committee to Finland. During the Second World War, Cooper reported on the Blitz in England and the Battle of Burma in his movie With G.I. Joe Around the World.

On November 6, 1948, while fishing out on Silver Lake in Harrisville, New Hampshire, Edwin Cooper fell from his boat and was drowned.

He was buried at Arlington National Cemetery.

== Film work ==
Lt. Edwin H. Cooper's report on how he and his camera team covered the American offensive at Château-Thierry

As photographic officer with the 26th Division, Cooper was responsible for many films that were taken for the U.S. Signal Corps during World War I. Much of this footage has been preserved by the National Archives in Washington, D.C. According to his own report, most of the footage that was produced for Pershing's Crusaders - America's first official war film by the Committee on Public Information - was made by Cooper and his photographic team. While researching their book American Cinematographers in the Great War, film historians Ron van Dopperen and Cooper C. Graham discovered footage shot by Cooper and his camera team during the attack on Château-Thierry in July 1918, as well as photographs showing the pictorial work by these men while covering the American attack. These images, together with Cooper's own story on what it was like to film the Great War, have been edited by the authors into a video reconstruction.

Cooper's film work during World War I also featured in the documentary Mobilizing Movies! The U.S. Signal Corps Goes to War, 1917-1919.

Documentary on the official American film cameramen in World War I

== Sources ==
- Albert E. George and Edwin H. Cooper, Pictorial History of the 26th Division, U.S. Army (Boston, The Ball Publishing Company, 1920) Download PDF (243Mb)
- Ron van Dopperen, "Filming the Front with the Yankee Division – Edwin H. Cooper and the Battle of Chateau-Thierry”, World War One Illustrated, (Summer 2026), 48-53
- James W. Castellan, Ron van Dopperen, Cooper C. Graham, American Cinematographers in the Great War, 1914-1918 (New Barnet 2014) https://doi.org/10.2307%2Fj.ctt1bmzn8c
- Weblog on the American Films and Cinematographers of World War I, 2013-2018
- Ron van Dopperen and Cooper C. Graham, The Growth of Official Military Cinema in the United States, 1917-1919 (2017)
- Edwin. H. Cooper, photographic officer 26th Division, A.E.F. (World War I pictures from the National Archives in Washington, D.C.)
- "Mobilizing Movies! The U.S. Signal Corps Goes To War, 1917-1919" (documentary, 4K improved video edit, 2026)
- "Filming the American Attack at Chateau-Thierry, July 1918" - Report by Lt. Edwin H. Cooper (reconstruction, 4K improved video edit, 2026)
- "Photographic Activities U.S. Signal Corps During World War I" (reconstruction, 4K improved video edit, 2026)
- American Cameramen in World War I - video reconstruction with Signal Corps pictures (2026)
- Movie Trailer "American Cinematographers in the Great War, 1914-1918"
