= Swift Sword =

Swift Sword may refer to:

- Exercise Saif Sareea (Arabic for Swift Sword), a series of military exercises by the United Kingdom and Oman
- Operation Swift Sword, a 2006 coalition military operation of the Iraq War
- Swift Sword (film), a 1980 Mandarin-language martial arts film directed by Ho Meng Hua
- Swift Sword, a 2014 nonfiction book by Doyle Glass
