= Thomas W. Stivers =

- Born: July 15, 1850; Madison County, Kentucky, United States
- Died: June 28, 1877 (aged 26); Kingston, Kentucky
- Burial place: Richmond City Cemetery
- Military career
- Allegiance: US
- Branch: United States Army
- Service years: 1871—1876
- Rank: Private
- Unit: 7th U.S. Cavalry
- Conflicts: Indian Wars; Great Sioux War of 1876-77
- Awards: Medal of Honor

Private Thomas W. Stivers (July 15, 1850 – June 28, 1877), also known under the name Thomas "Tom" Stevens or Stevers, was an American soldier in the U.S. Army who served with the 7th U.S. Cavalry during the Great Sioux War of 1876-77. One of twenty-four men to be awarded the Medal of Honor for gallantry at the Battle of the Little Bighorn on June 25, 1876, Stivers was among the soldiers who volunteered to carry water from the Little Bighorn River to the wounded on Reno Hill and awarded the Medal of Honor in 1878. He and two other fellow Kentuckians, Privates William M. Harris and George D. Scott, received the MOH for their role in the battle though Stivers received his posthumously.

== Biography ==
Thomas W. Stivers was born in Madison County, Kentucky, on July 15, 1850, the son of John W "Buck" Stivers (1822–1912) and his wife Mary Frances Ballard (1829–1884). Tom later moved to Mt. Vernon where he worked as a clerk. In August 1871, at the age of 21, he enlisted in the United States Army and was assigned to Company D of the 7th U.S. Cavalry Regiment for frontier duty. At the start of the Great Sioux War of 1876–77, Stivers accompanied the 7th U.S. Cavalry to the Dakota Territory and was present at the Battle of the Little Bighorn. He was one of nineteen men who volunteered to fetch water from the Little Big Horn and carry it to the wounded on Reno Hill throughout the battle. While four troopers exposed themselves to heavy enemy fire, in order to give covering fire, Stivers and fourteen others managed to leave the right wing of Captain Frederick Benteen's line and crossed eighty yards of "fire-swept ground" to reach a deep ravine which they used for cover to get to the river. They then used heavy camp kettles to make repeated trips back and forth from the Little Big Horn to Reno Hill.

Stivers and the other Little Big Horn water carriers faced great danger, especially with Sioux braves hidden in bushes along the river, and at least one of the soldiers was wounded in an ambush. He and the rest of the water carriers were cited for gallantry, along with five others for direct combat actions, and awarded the Medal of Honor two years after the battle though Stivers received his posthumously. Stivers was discharged on August 5, 1876, while encamped with his unit at the mouth of Rosebud Creek in the Montana Territory, and returned to Kentucky where he attempted to go into business for himself. He died less than a year later, murdered over a business dispute, in Kingston on June 28, 1877, at age 27. Stivers was buried in the city cemetery of nearby Richmond, Kentucky.

Stivers was one of three Kentuckians, along with Privates William M. Harris and George D. Scott, who were awarded the Medal of Honor for their actions during the battle, and as such, they have received special honors by their home state. Their role at the Little Big Horn is mentioned on a marker at the Richmond Cemetery where Stivers and Harris (both Marion County natives) are buried, though the location of Scott's gravesite is unknown. Kentucky Highway 1295, a state highway which runs through Kirksville to Garrard County, was later designated as the Harris-Scott-Stivers Memorial Highway. On June 26, 1999, a special commemoration ceremony to honor Kentucky's Medal of Honor winners was held for Stivers, Harris and Scott, at the Blue Grass Army Depot in Richmond; they were also listed at the Kentucky Medal of Honor Memorial in Louisville. Ten years later, the Richmond Register began profiling Stivers and other local MOH winners. On June 25, 2010, the Richmond Register published a second story honoring the men on the 134th anniversary of the battle.

== Medal of Honor citation ==
Rank and organization: Private, Company D, 7th U.S. Cavalry. Place and date: At Little Big Horn, Mont., 25–26 June 1876. Entered service at: Mt. Vernon, Ky. Birth: Madison County, Ky. Date of issue: 5 October 1878.

Citation

Voluntarily brought water to the wounded under fire.

== See also ==
- List of Medal of Honor recipients for the Indian Wars
