= Franklin M. McDonald =

US Army Medal of Honor recipient

- Born: 1850; Bowling Green, Kentucky
- Died: Unknown
- Military career
- Allegiance: United States of America
- Branch: United States Army
- Service years: 1871–1873
- Rank: Corporal
- Unit: 11th U.S. Infantry
- Conflicts: Indian Wars
- Awards: Medal of Honor

Franklin M. McDonald (1850–unknown) was a soldier in the U.S. Army during the Indian Wars and a recipient of the Medal of Honor for gallantry in defeating Indians who attacked the mail coach he was escorting.

== Biography ==
McDonald was born in 1850, in Bowling Green, Kentucky. He enlisted in Company G, 11th U.S. Infantry at Fort Griffin, Texas, on June 7, 1871.

On August 3, 1872, McDonald escorted a mail coach from Jacksboro, Texas, to Fort Griffin. Fifteen miles from Fort Belknap, it was attacked by a band of eight to 10 Kiowa Indians.

McDonald received the medal on September 8, 1872, without a formal ceremony and was promoted to Corporal. On December 4, 1873, McDonald deserted the Army and was never heard from again.

== Medal of Honor citation ==

Rank and organization
Private, Company G, 11th U.S. Infantry. Place and date: Near Fort Griffin, Tex., 5 August 1872. Entered service at: Fort Griffin, Texas, on June 7, 1871. Birth: Bowling Green, Ky. Date of issue: 31 August 1872.

Citation

Gallantry in defeating Indians who attacked the mail.

== See also ==
- List of Medal of Honor recipients
- List of Medal of Honor recipients for the Indian Wars
- Kentucky Medal of Honor Memorial
- Texas Medal of Honor Memorial
