= Kentucky Medal of Honor Memorial =

Memorial in Louisville, KY, US

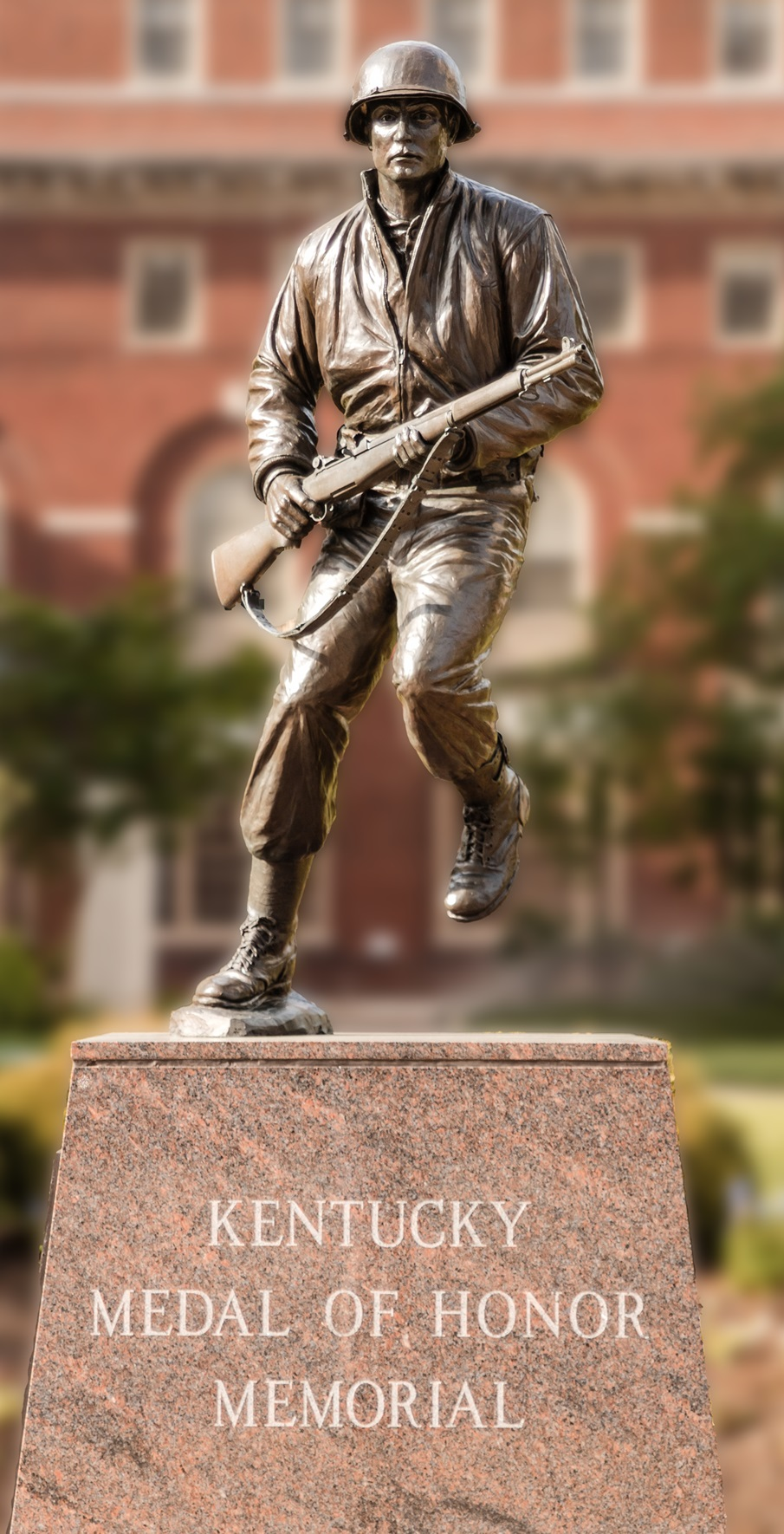
- Interactive map of Kentucky Medal of Honor Memorial
- Location: Louisville, Kentucky
- Coordinates: 38°15′15.14″N 85°45′32.66″W
- Designer: Doyle Glass (sculptor)
- Type: Sculpture on base
- Material: Sculpture: Bronze; Base: Limestone and granite
- Dedicated to: Recipients of the Medal of Honor from Kentucky

The Kentucky Medal of Honor Memorial is a statue in downtown Louisville, Kentucky, honoring all recipients of the Medal of Honor from the Commonwealth of Kentucky. Located at the corner of Fifth and Jefferson Streets on the grounds of the old Jefferson County Courthouse, the Memorial was sculpted by Doyle Glass and dedicated on Veterans Day 2001. The Memorial features a life-size bronze statue of Medal of Honor recipient John C. Squires as he would appear on the night he earned the Medal of Honor. Squires, a native of Louisville, was killed in action in Italy during World War II. The statue of Squires stands on a 4-foot-high (1.2 m) granite base. A plaque on the base lists the names of each recipient of the Medal of Honor from Kentucky.

== Recipients of the Medal of Honor from Kentucky ==
Civil War 1861–1865

- Army Captain William P. Black
- Army Private John H. Callahan
- Army Sergeant John S. Darrough
- Army Private John Davis
- Army Drummer William H. Horsfall
- Army Private Aaron Hudson
- Army Private Henry B. Mattingly
- Army Sergeant Francis M. McMillen
- Navy Landsman Daniel Noble
- Army Private Oliver P. Rood
- Army Sergeant Andrew J. Smith
- Army Private William Steinmetz
- Army Doctor Mary E. Walker
- Army Major John F. Weston
- Army Colonel James A. Williamson

Indian Campaigns 1870–1891

- Army Second Lieutenant Thomas Cruse
- Army First Sergeant William L. Day
- Army Corporal John J. Given
- Army Private William M. Harris
- Army Captain John B. Kerr
- Army Private Franklin M. McDonald
- Army Private George D. Scott
- Army Sergeant Thomas Shaw
- Army Private Thomas W. Stivers
- Army Private Thomas Sullivan
- Army Saddler Otto E. Voit
- Army Sergeant Brent Woods

Actions in Peacetime 1871–1910

- Navy Seaman Edward W. Boers
- Navy Watertender Edward A. Clary
- Navy Quarter Gunner George Holt

Wars of American Expansion 1897–1902

- Army Colonel J. Franklin Bell
- Army First Lieutenant Benjamin F. Hardaway
- Army Private James J. Nash

World War I 1917–1919

- Army Sergeant Willie Sandlin

World War II 1941–1945

- Marine Corps Corporal Richard E. Bush
- Army First Lieutenant Garlin Murl Conner
- Army Technical Sergeant Morris E. Crain
- Marine Corps Private First Class Leonard F. Mason
- Marine Corps Reserve Private First Class Wesley Phelps
- Army Private Wilburn K. Ross
- Marine Corps Private First Class Luther Skaggs Jr.
- Army Staff Sergeant Junior J. Spurrier
- Army Sergeant John C. Squires

Korean War 1950–1953

- Marine Corps Captain William E. Barber
- Marine Corps Private First Class William B. Baugh
- Army Corporal John W. Collier
- Army First Lieutenant Carl H. Dodd
- Army Second Lieutenant Darwin K. Kyle
- Army Private First Class David M. Smith
- Army Private First Class Ernest E. West

Vietnam War 1961–1975

- Army Sergeant Charles C. Fleek
- Army Staff Sergeant Don Jenkins
- Army Private First Class Billy L. Lauffer
- Army Sergeant First Class Gary L. Littrell
- Army Second Lieutenant John J. McGinty III
- Army Private First Class David P. Nash
- Marine Corps Lance Corporal Joe C. Paul

War in Afghanistan 2001–2021

- Marine Corps Sergeant Dakota Meyer

== See also ==
- 2001 in art
- Medal of Honor Memorial (Indianapolis)
- Oregon Veterans Medal of Honor Memorial
- Texas Medal of Honor Memorial
