= Carlton R. Rouh =

USMC Medal of Honor recipient (1919–1977)

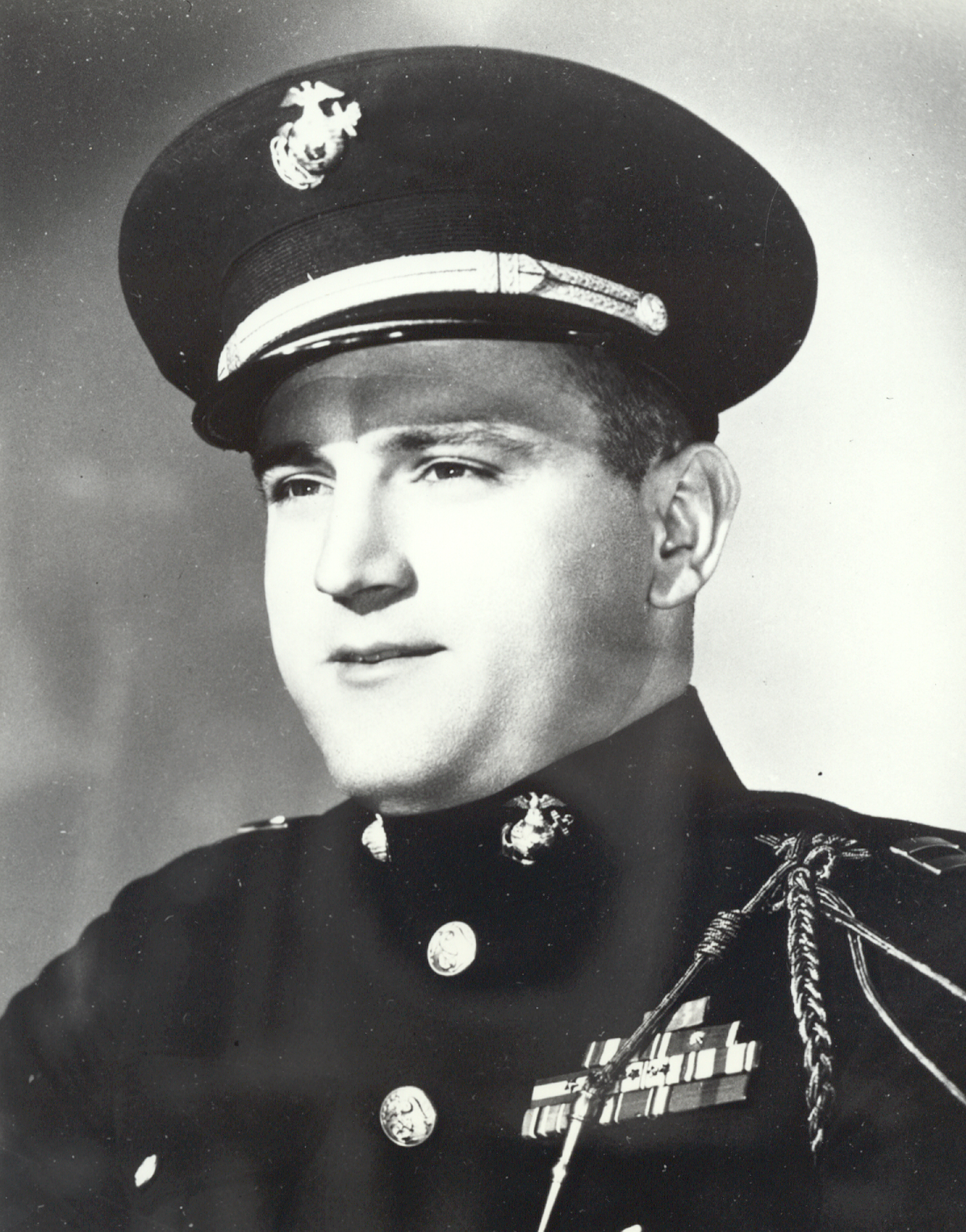
- Carlton R. Rouh, Medal of Honor recipient
- Born: May 11, 1919; Lindenwold, New Jersey
- Died: December 8, 1977 (aged 58); Camden, New Jersey
- Burial place: Berlin Cemetery, Berlin, New Jersey
- Military career
- Allegiance: United States
- Branch: United States Marine Corps
- Service years: 1942–1976
- Rank: Captain
- Units: 1st Battalion, 5th Marines, 1st Marine Division
- Conflicts: World War II: Battle of Guadalcanal; Battle of Cape Gloucester; Battle of Peleliu
- Awards: Medal of Honor; Silver Star; Purple Heart

Captain Carlton Robert Rouh (May 11, 1919 – December 8, 1977) was a United States Marine who received the Medal of Honor for gallantry in risking his life to save the lives of two fellow Marines on Peleliu Island on September 15, 1944. First Lieutenant Rouh threw his body between his fellow Marines and an exploding grenade. During World War II, 27 Marines similarly used their bodies to cover grenades in order to save the lives of others. Four of these Marines survived — including Rouh and fellow Medal of Honor recipients Richard E. Bush, Richard K. Sorenson, and Jacklyn H. Lucas. Rouh had earlier earned a field commission and been awarded the Silver Star medal of gallantry during the Battle of Guadalcanal for action on October 9, 1942.

== Marine Corps career ==
Carlton Rouh enlisted in the United States Marine Corps as a private one month after Pearl Harbor and fought in three Pacific campaigns. At Guadalcanal he earned the Silver Star Medal "for carrying wounded out under fire until wounded himself." Moreover, "for outstanding leadership and initiative in combat", he was given a field commission as a second lieutenant while at a rest camp in Australia. He commanded a machine gun platoon during the New Britain campaign.

== Medal of Honor action ==
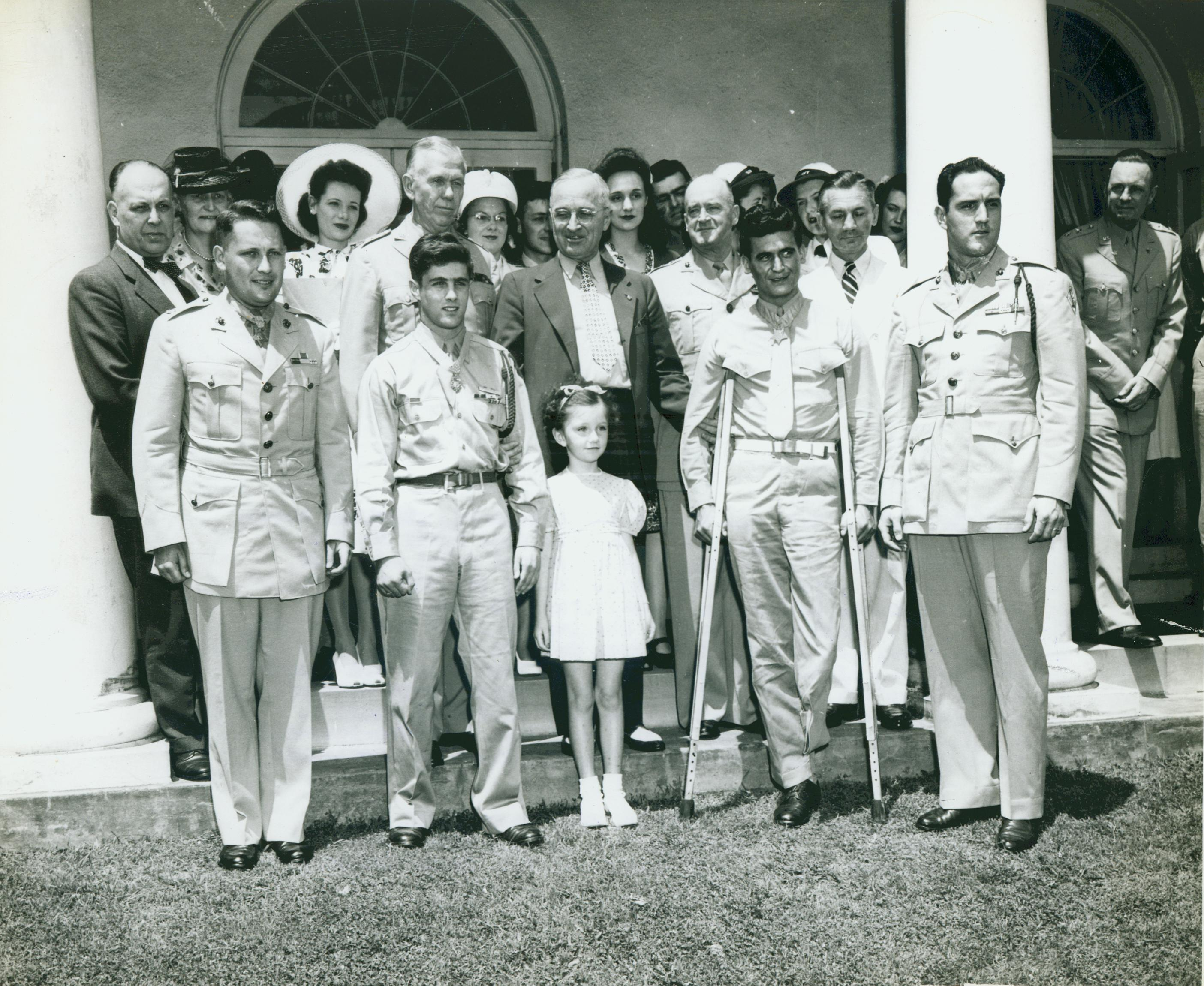
Carlton Rouh (front row, right) at the Medal of Honor presentation June 15, 1945

First Lieutenant Rouh had been moving his mortar platoon near the top of a small coral ridge in preparation for digging in for the night, according to a field dispatch from SSgt James F. Moser Jr., a Marine Corps Combat Correspondent. 1stLt Rouh decided to inspect an apparently empty Japanese dugout before permitting his men to use it.

A few minutes before, a flame-throwing squad had blasted fire into the position. Near the entrance, two of the enemy lay dead. 1st Lt Rouh could hear nothing. He stepped over the pair, and into the dark interior, his carbine ready. Creeping along the wall, he could see stores of supplies. He saw no life.

Suddenly a shot rang out, hitting the lieutenant in the left side. He stumbled back to his men outside. Several Japanese followed, throwing grenades. Fragments filled the air. One grenade landed close to the lieutenant and two of his men. There was no escape, for the Japanese had held it too long to be thrown back.

Despite his weakened condition, Rouh shoved his two comrades to the ground to save them from flying fragments. He dropped his carbine and dove for the grenade. He was down on his elbows and one knee when the grenade exploded. His abdomen and chest caught the blast, and he sank to the ground. None of his men were hit.

Still conscious, Rouh could half hear and see the rest of the fight. Tommy gun rounds rang out, killing the remaining Japanese survivors. One of his men stood over him. First Lieutenant Rouh's body was pock-marked by the grenade blast. One steel fragment had passed through his left lung and lodged near his heart. Other fragments sprayed his chest, left side and left arm.

Still under enemy artillery and mortar fire, he was given first aid by a passing doctor, and was carried back to a casualty evacuation point. "That was a miserable trip back," he said. "I thought they would get all the men with me. But somehow we made it."

Following his evacuation from Peleliu, he was hospitalized, and later honorably retired from active duty. For these actions, Rouh was presented with the Medal of Honor by President Harry S. Truman at a White House ceremony on June 15, 1945, which included presentations to fellow Marine recipients Everett P. Pope and Luther Skaggs Jr., as well as Army recipient Gino J. Merli, for their heroism during actions in the Central Pacific and European theatres.

He was promoted to captain in the Reserves upon his retirement. He died in December 1977 in Lindenwold, New Jersey.

== Citations ==
=== Medal of Honor citation ===
The President of the United States takes pride in presenting the MEDAL OF HONOR to

FIRST LIEUTENANT CARLTON R. ROUH
UNITED STATES MARINE CORPS RESERVE

for service as set forth in the following CITATION:

For conspicuous gallantry and intrepidity at the risk of his life above and beyond the call of duty while attached to the First Battalion, Fifth Marines, First Marine Division, during action against enemy Japanese forces on Peleliu Island, Palau Group, 15 September 1944. Before permitting his men to use an enemy dugout as a position for an 81-mm. mortar observation post, First Lieutenant Rouh made a personal reconnaissance of the pillbox and, upon entering, was severely wounded by Japanese rifle fire from within. Emerging from the dugout, he was immediately assisted by two Marines to a less exposed area, but while receiving first aid, was further endangered by an enemy grenade which was thrown into their midst. Quick to act in spite of his weakened condition, he lurched to a crouching position and thrust both men aside, placing his own body between them and the grenade and taking the full blast of the explosion himself. His exceptional spirit of loyalty and self-sacrifice in the face of almost certain death reflects the highest credit upon First Lieutenant Rouh and the United States Naval Service.

/S/ FRANKLIN D. ROOSEVELT

=== Silver Star citation ===
Citation:

The President of the United States of America takes pleasure in presenting the Silver Star to Private First Class Carlton Robert Rouh (MCSN: 0-351122), United States Marine Corps, for conspicuous gallantry and intrepidity while a member of Company M, Third Battalion, Fifth Marines, FIRST Marine Division, during action against enemy Japanese forces on Guadalcanal, Solomon Islands, 9 October 1942. While under tremendous hostile fire, Private First Class Rouh, with cool courage and utter disregard for his own personal safety, unhesitatingly volunteered assisting in the transportation of injured personnel to assisting in the transportation of injured personnel to the company aid station until he, himself, was wounded by enemy fire. His heroic conduct, maintained at great risk in the face of grave danger, was in keeping with the highest traditions of the United States Naval Service.

== Awards and Decorations ==

2nd row	Medal of Honor	Silver Star	Purple Heart with 5/16 inch star
2nd row	Combat Action Ribbon Retroactively Awarded, 1999	Navy Presidential Unit Citation with 1 Service star	Marine Corps Good Conduct Medal
3rd row	Selected Marine Corps Reserve Medal	American Campaign Medal	Asiatic-Pacific Campaign Medal with 3 Campaign stars
4th row	World War II Victory Medal	National Defense Service Medal with 1 Service star	Armed Forces Reserve Medal

== See also ==
- List of Medal of Honor recipients
