= William T. Perkins Jr. =

William Thomas Perkins Jr.
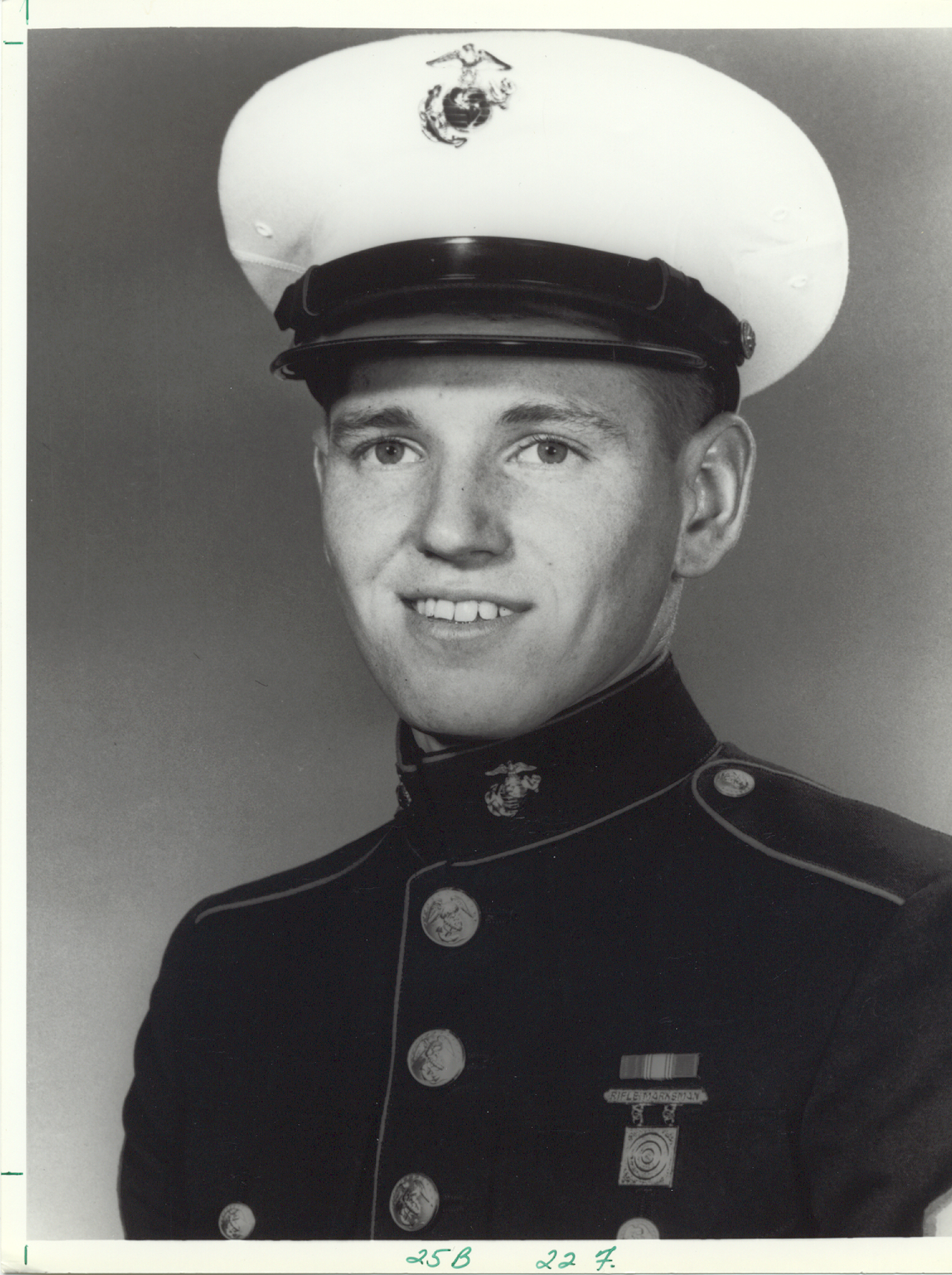
- William T. Perkins Jr., posthumous Medal of Honor recipient
- Born: August 10, 1947; Rochester, New York, U.S.
- Died: October 12, 1967 (aged 20); Hải Lăng District, Quang Tri Province, South Vietnam
- Burial place: San Fernando Mission Cemetery, San Fernando, California
- Military career
- Allegiance: United States of America
- Branch: United States Marine Corps
- Service years: 1966–1967
- Rank: Corporal
- Units: Company C, 1st Battalion 1st Marines, 1st Marine Division
- Conflicts: Vietnam War: Operation Medina †
- Awards: Medal of Honor; Purple Heart

William Thomas Perkins Jr. (August 10, 1947 – October 12, 1967) was a United States Marine who posthumously received the United States' highest military decoration for valor — the Medal of Honor — for his heroic action on October 12, 1967, during the Vietnam War in which he smothered an exploding grenade with his body to save the lives of three fellow Marines. Perkins is the only combat photographer to have received the Medal of Honor.

== Biography ==
William T. Perkins Jr. was born in Rochester, New York but moved with his family to California when he was in elementary school. He attended James Monroe High School, Sepulveda, California, joining the school's photography club. After graduating high school in 1965, he enrolled in Los Angeles Pierce College.

Perkins enlisted in the Marine Corps Reserve on April 27, 1966, and was discharged to enlist in the Regular Marine Corps on July 6, 1966.

Upon completion of recruit training with the 2nd Recruit Training Battalion, Marine Corps Recruit Depot, San Diego, he was promoted to private first class on September 22, 1966. Transferred to the Marine Corps Base, Camp Pendleton, he underwent individual combat training with the 3rd Battalion, 2nd Infantry Training Regiment.

From October 1966 to January 1967, he served as a photographer with Headquarters Battalion, Marine Corps Supply Center, Barstow, California. He primarily took still photographs but longed for more exciting assignments, telling his father, "All I do is take photos of the general in parades." He was promoted to Lance Corporal on January 1, 1967. For the next four months, LCpl Perkins was a student at the Motion Picture Photography, U.S. Army Signal Center and School, Fort Monmouth, New Jersey. In May 1967, he was transferred back to Headquarters Battalion, Barstow.

In July 1967, LCpl Perkins served as a photographer with Service Company, Headquarters Battalion, 3rd Marine Division and was transferred to the Republic of Vietnam. He was promoted to Corporal on August 1, 1967. While serving as a combat photographer with Company C, 1st Battalion, 1st Marines, 1st Marine Division during Operation Medina, he was killed in action on October 12, 1967.

William T. Perkins Jr. is buried in San Fernando Mission Cemetery in San Fernando, California.

== Awards and decorations ==
Cpl Perkins' was awarded the following medals:

Medal of Honor	Purple Heart	Presidential Unit Citation	National Defense Service Medal
Vietnam Service Medal with one bronze star	Vietnam Military Merit Medal	Vietnam Gallantry Cross with Palm	Republic of Vietnam Campaign Medal

== Medal of Honor citation ==
The President of the United States takes pride in presenting the MEDAL OF HONOR posthumously to

Corporal William T. Perkins Jr.
United States Marine Corps

for service as set forth in the following citation:

For conspicuous gallantry and intrepidity at the risk of his life above and beyond the call of duty while serving as a combat photographer attached to Company C, First Battalion, First Marines, First Marine Division, in the Republic of Vietnam on 12 October 1967. During Operation MEDINA, a major reconnaissance in force, southwest of Quang Tri, Company C made heavy combat contact with a numerically superior North Vietnamese Army Force estimated at from two to three companies. The focal point of the intense fighting was a helicopter landing zone which was also serving as the Command Post of Company C. In the course of a strong hostile attack, an enemy grenade landed in the immediate area occupied by Corporal Perkins and three other Marines. Realizing the inherent danger, he shouted the warning, "Incoming Grenade" to his fellow Marines, and in a valiant act of heroism, hurled himself upon the grenade absorbing the impact of the explosion with his own body thereby saving the lives of his comrades at the cost of his own. Through his exceptional courage and inspiring valor in the face of certain death, Corporal Perkins reflected great credit upon himself and the Marine Corps and upheld the highest traditions of the United States Naval Service. He gallantly gave his life for his country.

/S/ RICHARD M. NIXON

== In memory ==
The name of William T. Perkins Jr. is inscribed on the Vietnam Veterans Memorial ("The Wall") on Panel 27E Row 097.

His name is also on a bollard in the Walk of Honor at the Vietnam Veterans Memorial of Greater Rochester, NY.

His name is also on a paver at the First Responder Walk, Huntsville/Madison County Veterans Memorial, Huntsville, Alabama.

The 2D Marine Division Communications Strategy and Operations building in Camp Lejeune, North Carolina is named the “William T. Perkins Memorial Photography Laboratory” in his honor. His Medal of Honor resides in the front office display case.

== See also ==
- List of Medal of Honor recipients
- List of Medal of Honor recipients for the Vietnam War
- Herbert Joseph Thomas (posthumous Medal of Honor for smothering a grenade in World War II)
- Richard K. Sorenson (survived smothering a grenade in World War II)
