= Operation Medina =

1967 Vietnam War search-and-destroy operation

- Part of the Vietnam War
Date	11–20 October 1967
Location	Hải Lăng Forest, South Vietnam
Result	Inconclusive

Belligerents
United States	North Vietnam

Commanders and leaders
Herbert E. Ing Jr.	Unknown

Units involved
1st Battalion, 1st Marines; 2nd Battalion, 1st Marines; 1st Battalion, 3rd Marines	5th Regiment; 6th Regiment

Casualties and losses
34 killed	US body count: 53 killed 3 captured 26 weapons recovered

Operation Medina was a search and destroy operation conducted from 11 to 20 October 1967, in the Hải Lăng Forest Reserve south of Quảng Trị, South Vietnam.

== Background ==
The Hải Lăng Forest was the location of the People's Army of Vietnam (PAVN) Base Area 101 which supported the PAVN 5th and 6th Regiments. Due to a lack of available forces in I Corps the base had not been targeted by the Marines and Army of the Republic of Vietnam (ARVN).

== Operation ==
The operation began with a helicopter assault by the 1st Battalion, 1st Marines and the 2nd Battalion, 1st Marines directly into the forest at Landing Zone Dove (16.60795°N 107.15508°E) and then a northeast sweep while the 1st Battalion, 3rd Marines acted as a blocking force.

On the morning of 11 October, Company C, 1/3 Marines was hit by PAVN mortar and small arms fire and then a ground assault, which was repelled.

On the afternoon of 12 October, Company C, 1/1 Marines engaged PAVN soldiers in thick jungle, several marines were wounded and so Company C fell back and formed a perimeter to allow medevac helicopters to evacuate the wounded. Shortly after the evacuation was completed Company C was attacked on two sides by an estimated three PAVN companies. Company D was sent to reinforce Company C and together they succeeded in driving off the attack. The following morning the Marines claimed 40 PAVN dead were found around the perimeter, Marines losses were eight dead and 39 wounded. CPL William T. Perkins Jr. would be posthumously awarded the Medal of Honor for his actions during the battle.

The Marines continued their sweep finding a number of recently evacuated PAVN camps, but the PAVN avoided any further engagements with the Marines. Further north, two Battalions of the ARVN Airborne Division mounted Operation Lam Son 138 and on the morning of 20 October they engaged the PAVN 416th Battalion, part of the 5th Regiment, and claimed killing 197 PAVN.

Medina concluded on 20 October, the 1st Marines stayed in the area and began Operation Osceola with limited results.

== Aftermath ==
The operation was indecisive. The PAVN were not driven out of the Hải Lăng Forest, but their operations were severely disrupted. Marine losses were 34 dead and 143 wounded, while the US claimed that the PAVN lost 53 killed, 3 captured, and 26 weapons recovered.

The Marines and Navy Corpsmen of Charlie Company, 1st Marines, are the subject of Lions of Medina, an award winning and critically acclaimed book by historian Doyle Glass.
