= Richard K. Sorenson =

US Marine (1924-2004)

Richard Keith Sorenson
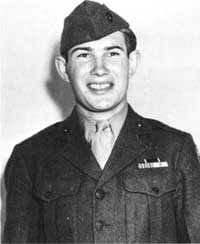
- Richard K. Sorenson, Medal of Honor recipient
- Born: August 28, 1924; Anoka, Minnesota
- Died: October 9, 2004 (aged 80); Reno, Nevada
- Burial place: Fort Snelling National Cemetery, Minneapolis, Minnesota
- Military career
- Allegiance: United States of America
- Branch: United States Marine Corps
- Service years: 1943–1946, 1947–1955
- Rank: First lieutenant
- Unit: 3rd Battalion, 24th Marines
- Conflicts: World War II: Battle of Kwajalein
- Awards: Medal of Honor; Purple Heart
- Other work: Veterans Administration

Richard Keith Sorenson (August 28, 1924 – October 9, 2004) was a United States Marine who, as a private, received the Medal of Honor during World War II for his heroism during the Marine landing on Kwajalein Atoll on the night of February 1–2, 1944. He threw himself on a Japanese grenade that was part of US munitions captured during the Battle of Bataan, to save the lives of five fellow Marines. Although fragments of the grenade ripped through his thighs, hips, right arm and right leg, he survived the action. Of the 27 Marines who similarly threw themselves on grenades to save the lives of their fellow Marines during World War II, Sorenson was one of only four who lived. Fellow Medal of Honor recipients Richard E. Bush, Jacklyn H. Lucas and Carlton R. Rouh were the other three survivors.

After recovering from the wounds, Sorenson continued to serve in the Marine Corps until he was discharged in 1946 at the rank of sergeant. He enlisted in the Reserves in 1947. He reached the rank of master sergeant, received a commission as a Marine Corps officer in 1953 and remained in the Corps until 1955.

== Biography ==
The son of a U.S. Navy World War I veteran, Sorenson was born in Anoka, Minnesota. He graduated from high school in 1942.

=== World War II ===
Sorenson enlisted in the Marine Corps on December 13, 1942. He reported to Marine Corps Recruit Depot San Diego, California in January 1943 for recruit training. In April 1943, he joined Company M, 3rd Battalion, 24th Marines, at Camp Pendleton, where he underwent intensive training before sailing for Kwajalein in the Marshall Islands on January 11, 1944.

Sorenson landed with his battalion at Namur, Kwajalein, on February 1, 1944. On that first day of the invasion, he was wounded in action, for which he was awarded the Medal of Honor. After a fierce night of battle, a Japanese soldier threw a grenade in the midst of his squad. Sorenson threw himself on the grenade and took the explosion's full force. A corpsman tied off a severed artery and covered the severe wounds, and Sorenson was evacuated to a transport to Hawaii. He underwent six surgeries in the next nine months.

Sorenson was hospitalized at Pearl Harbor until May, then transferred to the U.S. Naval Hospital in Seattle, Washington. In mid-1944, he was informed that he would receive the Medal of Honor by the commanding officer of the hospital, Captain Joel Boone, who received the same honor during World War I. On July 19, 1944, a month after being promoted to private first class, Sorenson was presented the Medal of Honor by Major General Joseph C. Fegan, then commanding the Department of the Pacific.

Released from the hospital later in July, Sorenson was ordered to the Marine Air Detachment at the Naval Air Station, Minneapolis, where he was promoted to corporal that August. The next month he was assigned to the headquarters of the Central Recruiting Division in Chicago and promoted to sergeant. He was transferred from Chicago to the Midwestern Recruiting Division in St. Louis in September 1945, and while attached to that division, served at the Marine Corps Recruiting Station in Fargo, North Dakota. From there he was ordered to Great Lakes, Illinois, where he was discharged on February 23, 1946.

=== Civilian life; return to the Marine Corps ===
Back in civilian life, Sorenson worked as a contact representative for the Veterans Administration in Minneapolis and Alexandria, Minnesota. He also attended St. John's University in Collegeville, Minnesota, and enlisted in the Marine Corps Reserve on July 10, 1947. He was ordered back to extended active duty on November 17, 1950, and for the next three years, was stationed at the Marine Corps Recruiting Station in Minneapolis. There, he was promoted to staff sergeant in May 1951, and to Master Sergeant in June 1953. In November 1953, following his appointment as a second lieutenant, he was ordered to the Marine Corps Schools at Quantico, Virginia, where he completed the Basic School for Marine officers in April 1954.

Sorenson then served as Assistant Supply Officer of the 7th Engineer Battalion at Camp Pendleton, where he was appointed a first lieutenant in September 1954. He was transferred to the 2nd Replacement Battalion at Camp Pendleton in January 1955, and that March was ordered overseas for duty with the 3rd Engineer Battalion, 3rd Marine Division. With that unit he served in Japan and on Okinawa before returning to the United States that November to be discharged after voluntarily reverting to the rank of Master Sergeant.

=== Post-Marine Corps career ===
After leaving the Marine Corps in 1955, Sorenson returned to work for the Veterans Administration until 1957. For the next 10 years, he worked as an insurance underwriter, but then returned to the V.A. He remained with the V.A. until his retirement as director of Veterans Affairs for the state of Nevada and nine counties of California in 1985.

As a civilian, Sorenson was active in his community, serving on the United Way's board of directors, the regional Boy Scout Council, and the board of directors for the Navy League.

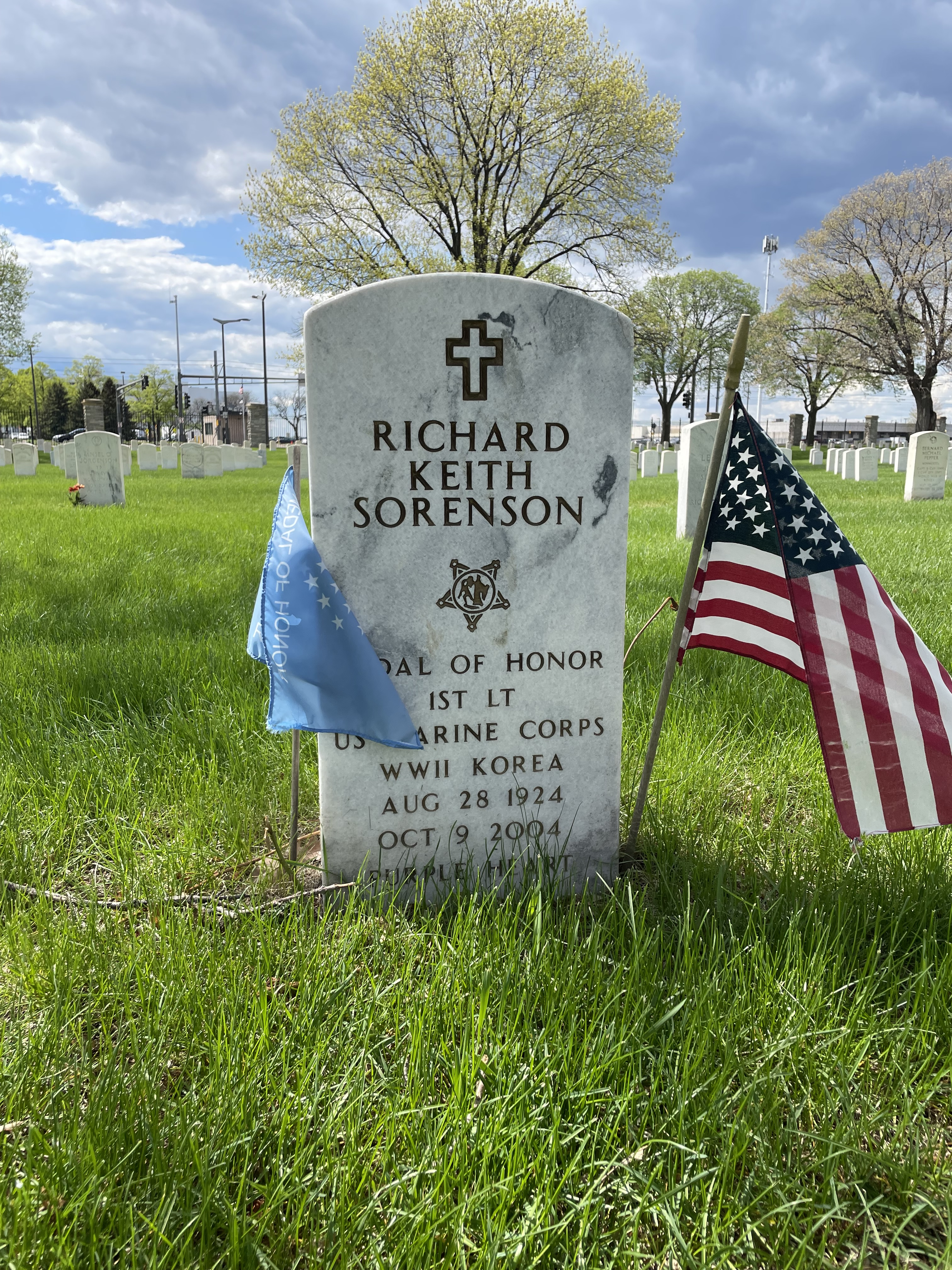
Richard Keith Sorenson Headstone

Sorenson died at age 80 in Reno, Nevada. He was survived by his wife and five children. He was buried with full military honors at Fort Snelling National Cemetery in Minnesota.

Sorenson was the Guest of Honor at the 50th anniversary commemoration of the invasion of Kwajalein Atoll in 1994.

== Medal of Honor citation ==
The President of the United States takes pride in presenting the MEDAL OF HONOR to

PRIVATE RICHARD K. SORENSON
UNITED STATES MARINE CORPS RESERVE

for service as set forth in the following CITATION:

For conspicuous gallantry and intrepidity at the risk of his life above and beyond the call of duty while serving with an assault battalion attached to the Fourth Marine Division during the battle of Namur Island, Kwajalein Atoll, Marshall Islands, on February 1–2, 1944. Putting up a brave defense against a particularly violent counterattack by the enemy during invasion operations, Private Sorenson and five other Marines occupying a shellhole were endangered by a Japanese grenade thrown into their midst. Unhesitatingly, and with complete disregard for his own safety, Private Sorenson hurled himself upon the deadly weapon, heroically taking the full impact of the explosion. As a result of his gallant action, he was severely wounded, but the lives of his comrades were saved. His great personal valor and exceptional spirit of self-sacrifice in the face of almost certain death were in keeping with the highest traditions of the United States Naval Service.

/S/ FRANKLIN D. ROOSEVELT

== See also ==
- The Silent Wrecks of Kwajalein Atoll

(2004 Documentary includes interviews with Richard Sorenson)

- Herbert Joseph Thomas (posthumous Medal of Honor for smothering a grenade in the Solomons)
- William T. Perkins Jr. (posthumous Medal of Honor for smothering a grenade in the Vietnam War)
