= Herbert Joseph Thomas =

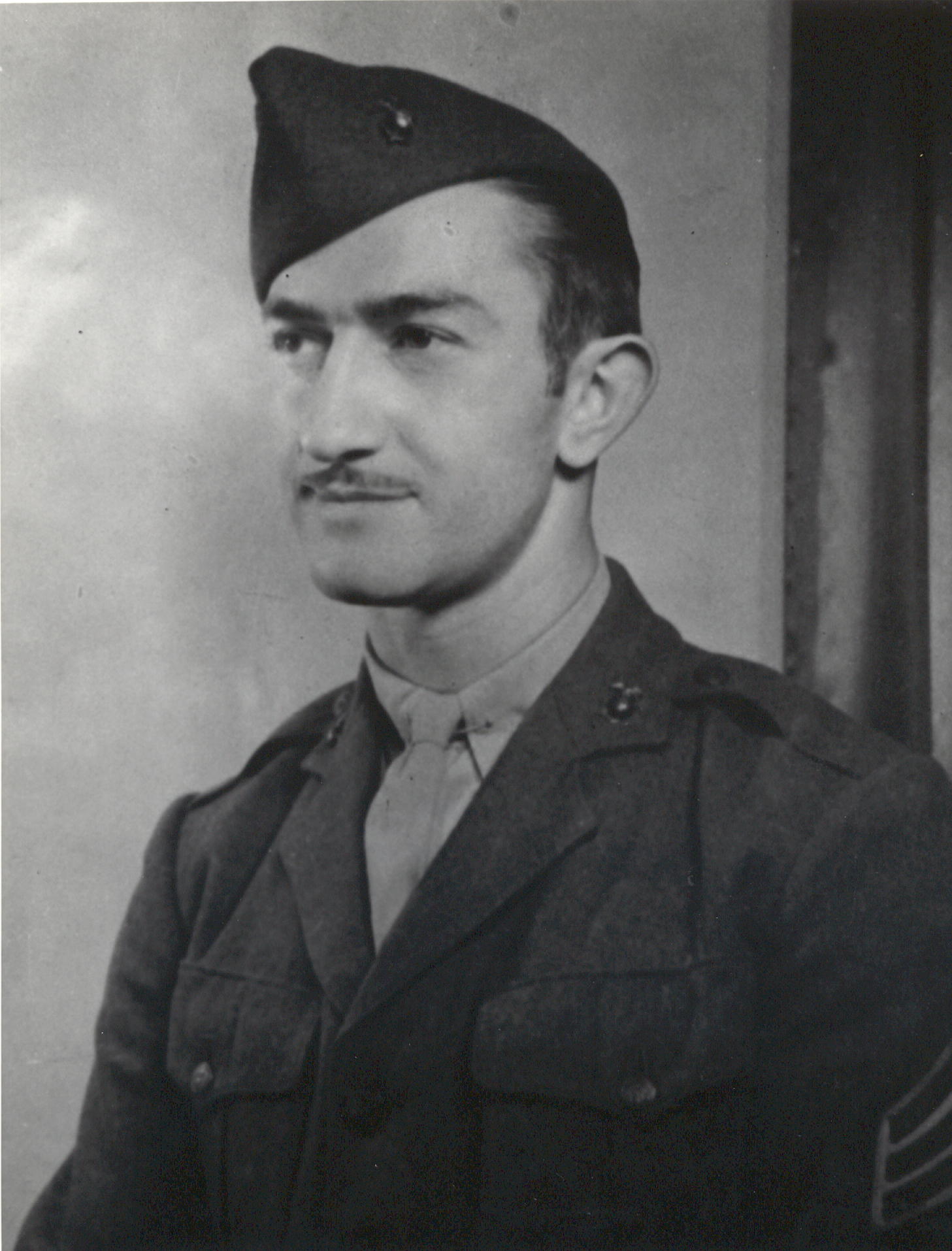
- Born: February 9, 1918; Columbus, Ohio, U.S.
- Died: November 7, 1943 (aged 25); Koromokina Lagoon, Bougainville, Solomon Islands
- Burial place: Sunset Memorial Park, South Charleston, West Virginia
- Military career
- Allegiance: United States of America
- Branch: U.S. Army Air Forces; United States Marine Corps
- Service years: 1941–1942 (USAAC); 1942–1943 (USMC)
- Rank: Sergeant
- Units: 1st Battalion, 3rd Marines, 3rd Marine Division
- Conflicts: World War II: Bougainville campaign; Battle of Koromokina Lagoon †
- Awards: Medal of Honor; Navy Cross; Purple Heart

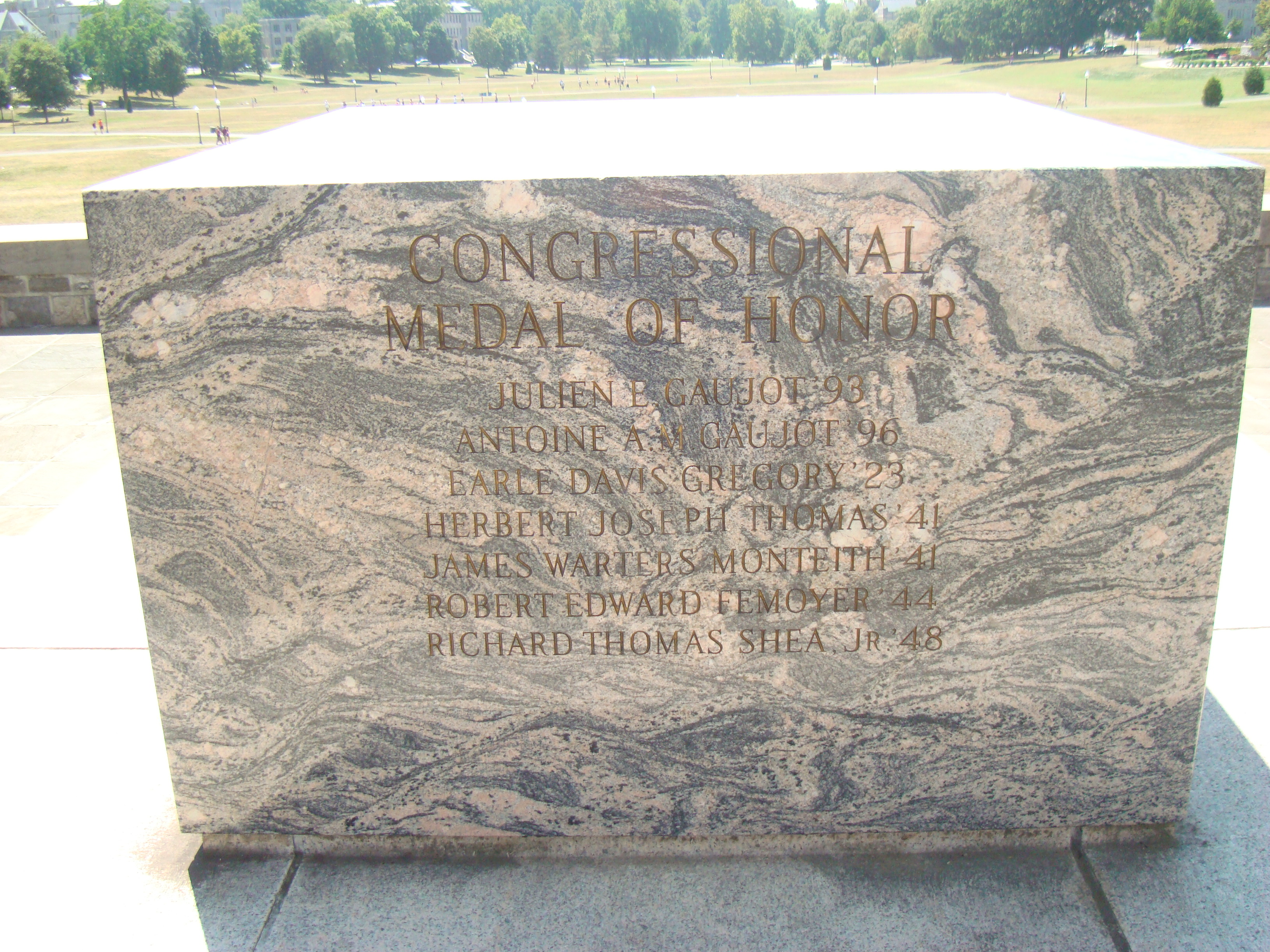
Thomas' name on the Virginia Tech's MOH memorial stone.

Herbert Joseph Thomas Jr. (February 8, 1918 – November 7, 1943) was a United States Marine who was awarded the Medal of Honor for his actions during World War II.

== Early life and education ==
He was born in Columbus, Ohio, but spent most of his childhood in South Charleston, West Virginia, where his family moved when he was seven years old. Thomas eventually went to Virginia Tech, joining the Virginia Tech Corps of Cadets as part of Charlie Company. He went on an American football scholarship. In his senior year of 1940, he led his team in pass receptions and scoring, and all Virginian college players in scoring. He would go on to be named to the Virginia Tech Sports Hall of Fame. Thomas left Virginia Tech in July 1941 to enlist in the Army Air Corps, but transferred to the Marines because many of his friends were in that branch of service.

== Career ==
Thomas was posthumously awarded the Medal of Honor for his actions during combat versus Japanese army forces on the battle of Koromokina Lagoon (on November 7, 1943). Thomas attempted to disable a machine gun post with a hand grenade. However, the grenade bounced off the jungle flora and fell back to his position. He immediately leaped onto the grenade to save the lives of his men, who went on to destroy the enemy machine gun.

== Medal of Honor citation ==
The President of the United States takes pride in presenting the MEDAL OF HONOR posthumously to

SERGEANT HERBERT J. THOMAS
UNITED STATES MARINE CORPS RESERVE

for service as set forth in the following CITATION:

For conspicuous gallantry and intrepidity at the risk of his life above and beyond the call of duty while serving with the Third Marines, Third Marine Division, in action against enemy Japanese forces during the battle at the Koromokina River, Bougainville Island, Solomon Islands, on November 7, 1943. Although several of his men were struck by enemy bullets as he led his squad through dense jungle undergrowth in the face of severe hostile machine gun fire, Sergeant Thomas and his group fearlessly pressed forward into the center of the Japanese position and destroyed the crews of two machine guns by accurate rifle fire and grenades. Discovering a third gun more difficult to approach, he carefully placed his men closely around him in strategic positions from which they were to charge after he had thrown a grenade into the emplacement. When the grenade struck vines and fell back into the midst of the group, Sergeant Thomas deliberately flung himself upon it to smother the explosion, valiantly sacrificing his life for his comrades. Inspired by his selfless action, his men unhesitatingly charged the enemy machine gun and, with fierce determination, killed the crew and several other nearby defenders. The splendid initiative and extremely heroic conduct of Sergeant Thomas in carrying out his prompt decision with full knowledge of his fate reflect great credit upon himself and the United States Naval Service. He gallantly gave his life for his country.

== Legacy ==
A United States Navy destroyer, the USS Herbert J. Thomas (DD-833), was named in his honor. The destroyer was launched on March 25, 1945, and commissioned on May 29, 1945.

The Thomas Memorial Hospital (now part of Thomas Health System) in South Charleston, West Virginia, is also named in his honor.

Thomas Hall, a dormitory built in 1949 at Virginia Tech was named in his honor.

The Herbert J Thomas Memorial Detachment #947 of the Marine Corps League is named in his honor.

== See also ==
- List of Medal of Honor recipients
- William T. Perkins, Jr. (posthumous Medal of Honor for smothering a grenade in the Vietnam War)
- Richard K. Sorenson (survived smothering a grenade in World War II)
