= Doyle Glass =

American historical novelist and sculptor (born 1962)

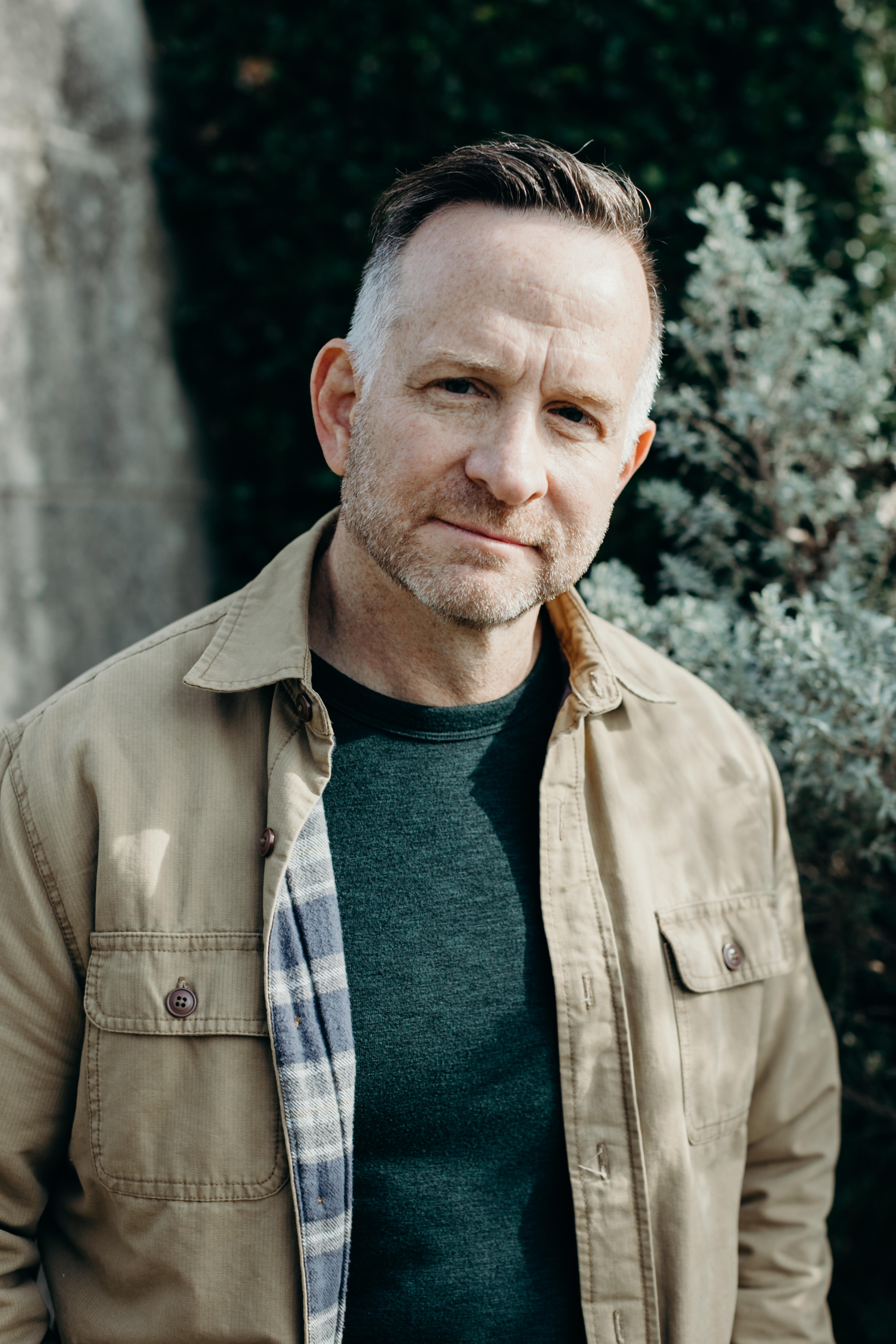
- Born: January 22, 1962 (age 64); Midland, Texas, U.S.
- Education: Southern Methodist University (BA) (JD)
- Occupations: Historical Novelist and Sculptor
- Writing career
- Period: 2001–present
- Genres: Historical fiction and nonfiction, Realism
- Notable works: Swift Sword, Lions of Medina, Texas Medal of Honor Memorial, Kentucky Medal of Honor Memorial
- Website: www.doyleglass.com

Doyle Glass (born January 22, 1962) is an American author, historical novelist and sculptor. He is best known for his nonfiction books Lions of Medina(2007), Swift Sword (2014; revised edition 2023), which chronicle the experiences of U.S. Marines during the Vietnam War, and for sculpting the Kentucky Medal of Honor Memorial and the Texas Medal of Honor Memorial.

== Early life and education ==
Glass was born and raised in Midland, Texas. He developed an early interest in American history, particularly the Texas Revolution, World War II, and the Vietnam War—subjects that later became the focus of much of his sculpture and writing.

He attended Trinity School in Midland before graduating from Midland High School. Glass earned a Bachelor of Arts in History from Southern Methodist University in 1984 and a Juris Doctor from the SMU Dedman School of Law in 1988.

== Career ==
Following law school, Glass served as an Assistant District Attorney in McLennan and Bell Counties, Texas, before joining the Kentucky Attorney General's Office as an Assistant Attorney General in the Special Prosecutions Division.

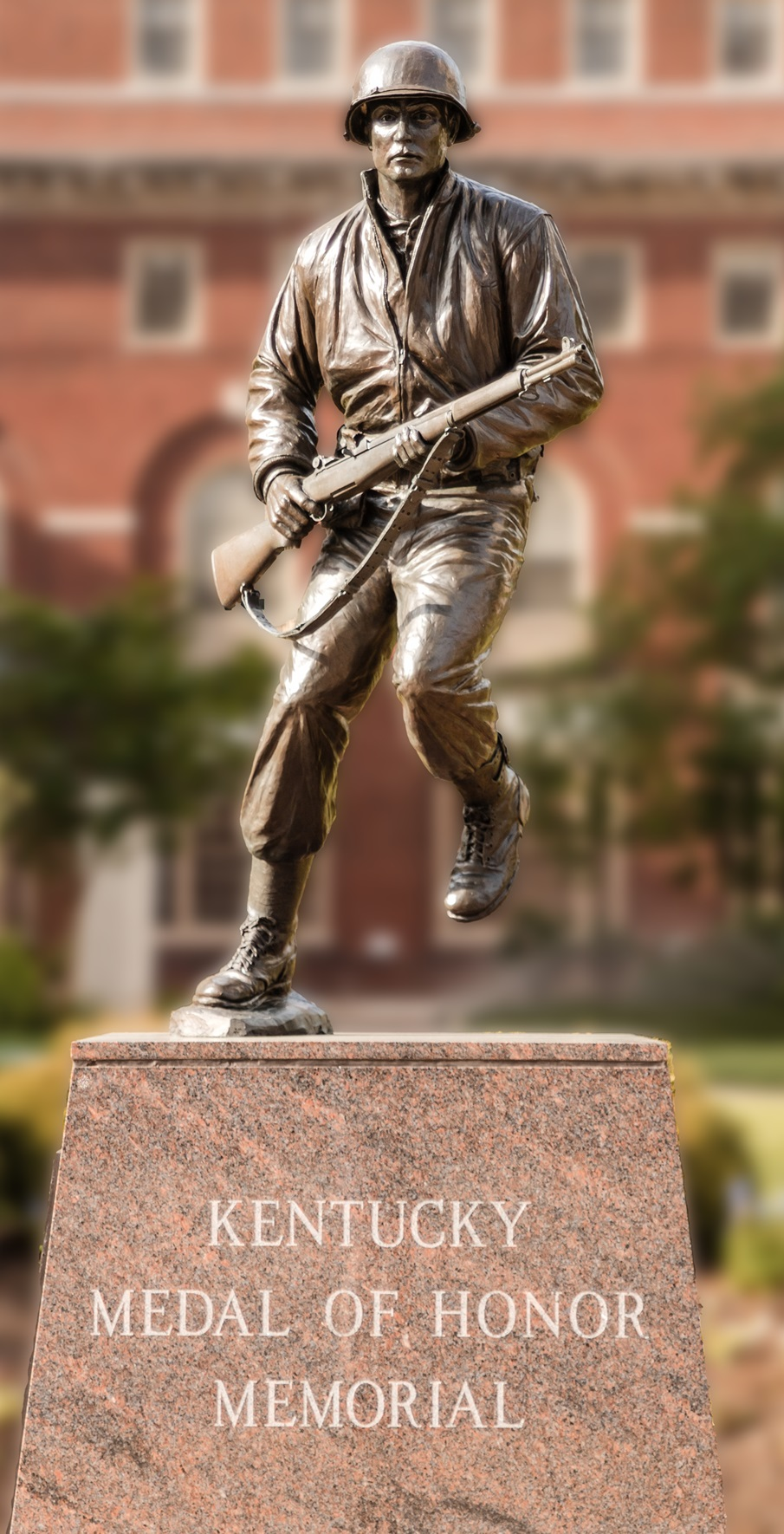
Kentucky Medal of Honor Memorial (2001), Louisville, Kentucky

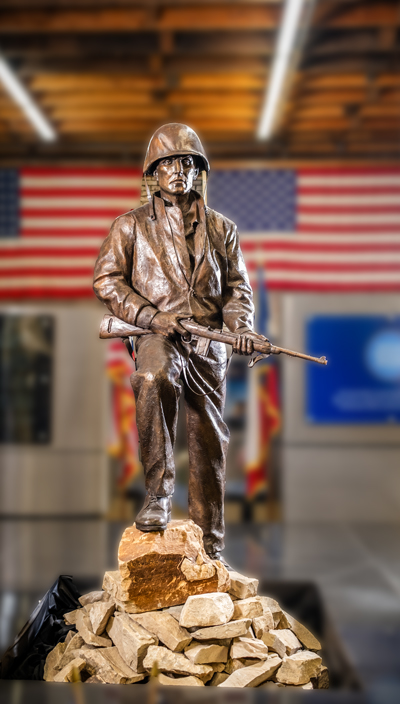
Texas Medal of Honor Memorial (2008), International Artillery Museum, Saint Jo, Texas

In 2000, he left the practice of law to pursue sculpture and historical writing. His first major works were the Kentucky Medal of Honor Memorial in Louisville, Kentucky, and the Texas Medal of Honor Memorial at the International Artillery Museum in Saint Jo, Texas., The Kentucky Memorial features a bronze statue of Medal of Honor recipient John C. Squires, while the Texas memorial depicts Medal of Honor recipient George O'Brien Jr. in bronze. Each memorial honors all Medal of Honor recipients from its respective state.

Inspired by the stories of the men commemorated in those memorials, Glass turned to historical writing. His first two books, Lions of Medina and Swift Sword, are based on extensive interviews with Marine veterans who participated in Operation Medina and Operation Swift during the Vietnam War. The revised edition of Swift Sword received the 2023 PenCraft Award for Best Nonfiction.

Glass later expanded into historical fiction with Codename Lionel, a historical thriller based on the life of French racing champion and Resistance operative Robert Benoist during World War II. Prior to publication, the novel received favorable reviews from Kirkus Reviews, BookLife by Publishers Weekly, and IndieReader, which praised its historical research, storytelling, and cinematic scope. He is currently writing two books: Honor Bound, a historical thriller exploring the relationship between William Barrett Travis and the enslaved man Joe during the Texas Revolution, and Through the Breach, a nonfiction account of the Marines of Kilo Company, 3rd Battalion, 5th Marines during the Second Battle of Fallujah.

== Personal life ==
Glass lives in Dallas, Texas with his wife Somer. They have three grown children.

Glass has said that his Christian faith shapes his work as both an author and sculptor and that his purpose is to preserve overlooked stories of courage, sacrifice, and faith for future generations.

He serves on the executive boards of the Southern Methodist University Meadows School of the Arts, SMU Athletics, and Athletes United, and is a member of the Alamo Leadership Advisory Council and the Industry Advisory Council for Media for Texas. He is a former member of the Southern Methodist University Alumni Board and the Board of Trustees of the Dallas Children's Advocacy Center.

Glass and his wife actively support educational, historical, and charitable organizations, including Trinity School and Southern Methodist University. Their philanthropic interests include education, the preservation of history, children's advocacy, and Christian outreach.

Outside of his writing and sculpture, Glass enjoys Brazilian jiu-jitsu and the continued study of American history.

== Works ==
Sculpture

- The Kentucky Medal of Honor Memorial (2001)
- The Texas Medal of Honor Memorial (2008)

Books

- Lions of Medina (2007)
- Swift Sword (2014; revised edition 2023)
- Codename Lionel (historical thriller)
- Honor Bound (historical thriller; in progress)
- Through the Breach (nonfiction; in progress)

== Awards and Honors ==
- 2023 PenCraft Award for Best Nonfiction (Swift Sword)
