= Gino J. Merli =

US Army Medal of Honor recipient (1924–2002)

Gino Joseph Merli
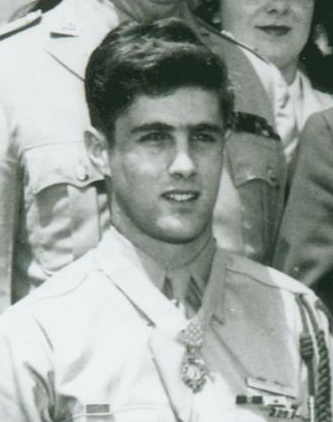
- Born: May 13, 1924; Scranton, Pennsylvania
- Died: June 11, 2002 (aged 78); Peckville, Pennsylvania
- Burial place: Our Mother of Sorrows Cemetery Carbondale, Pennsylvania
- Military career
- Allegiance: United States of America
- Branch: United States Army
- Service years: 1943 - 1945
- Rank: Sergeant
- Units: Company H, 2nd Battalion 18th Infantry Regiment,
- Conflicts: World War II
- Awards: Medal of Honor; Bronze Star; Purple Heart

Gino Joseph Merli (May 13, 1924 – June 11, 2002) was an Italian-American soldier, and recipient of the Medal of Honor during World War II.

== Biography ==
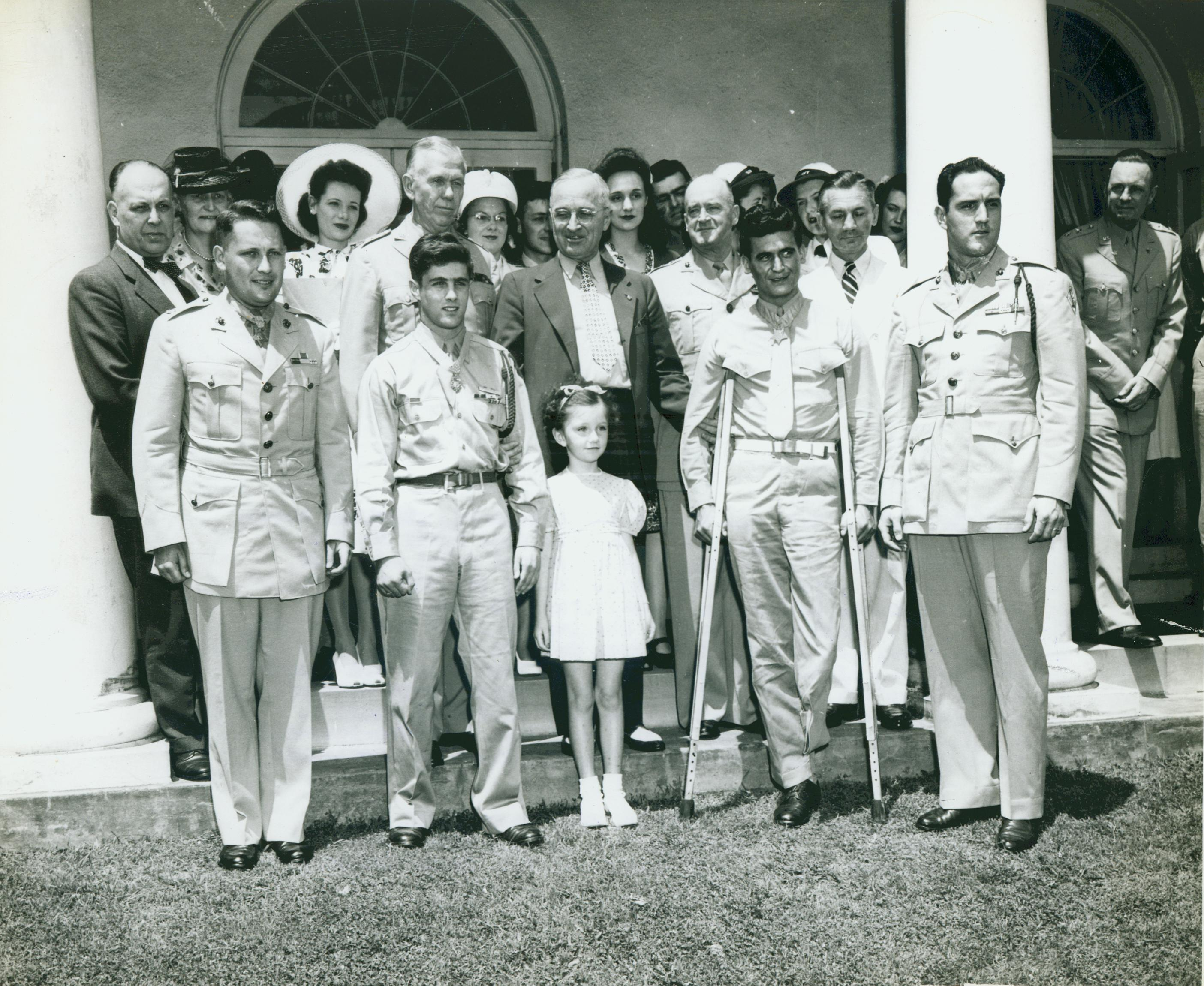
Gino Merli (front row, second from left) at the Medal of Honor presentation June 15, 1945

Born in Scranton, Pennsylvania, Merli was the son of a coal miner. He entered service in the United States Army from Peckville in July 1943 and served with the 2nd Battalion, 18th Infantry Regiment, 1st Infantry Division. With his division, he went ashore at Omaha Beach on D-Day in 1944 and participated in the Battle of the Bulge in December of the same year.

On the evening of September 4, 1944, near Sars-la-Bruyère in Belgium (now a deelgemeente of Frameries), his company was attacked by a superior German force. Their position was overwhelmed, but PFC Merli stayed with his machine gun covering their retreat. When his position was overrun, he feigned death while German soldiers prodded him with their bayonets, only to rise and confront the enemy when they withdrew. Twice he fooled German soldiers into believing he was no longer a threat, only to attack them again when they left him for dead. In the morning, a counterattack forced the Germans to ask for a truce. The negotiating party found Merli still at his gun.

For these actions, Merli was presented with the Medal of Honor by President Harry S. Truman at a White House ceremony on June 15, 1945, which included presentations to Marine recipients Everett P. Pope, Luther Skaggs Jr. and Carlton R. Rouh, for their heroism during actions in the Central Pacific theatre. In addition, Merli received two Purple Hearts, the Bronze Star, and the Humanitarian Award of the Chapel of Four Chaplains for his actions during World War II.

In civilian life, Merli took it upon himself to serve fellow veterans. He was an adjudication officer for the Veterans Administration Medical Center in Plains Township, Pennsylvania. He traveled to the Normandy beaches in 1984 in the company of Tom Brokaw and was a source of inspiration for Brokaw's book The Greatest Generation.

== Namesakes and honors ==
The Veterans' Center in Scranton was named for Gino Merli in 2002. It is called the Gino J. Merli Veterans’ Center.

Merli-Sarnoski State Park, located in Fell Township (just outside Carbondale, Pennsylvania), is co-named for Mr. Merli and Joseph Sarnoski, another World War II Medal of Honor recipient and Lackawanna County resident.

Gino Merli Drive (one of the main roads) in Peckville, Pennsylvania, is also named for him.

== Medal of Honor citation ==
The President of the United States of America, in the name of Congress, takes pleasure in presenting the MEDAL OF HONOR to

PRIVATE FIRST CLASS GINO JOSEPH MERLI
UNITED STATES ARMY

for service as set forth in the following CITATION:

He was serving as a machine gunner in the vicinity of Sars la Bruyere, Belgium, on the night of 4–5 September 1944, when his company was attacked by a superior German force. Its position was overrun and he was surrounded when our troops were driven back by overwhelming numbers and firepower. Disregarding the fury of the enemy fire concentrated on him he maintained his position, covering the withdrawal of our riflemen and breaking the force of the enemy pressure. His assistant machine gunner was killed and the position captured; the other 8 members of the section were forced to surrender. Pfc. Merli slumped down beside the dead assistant gunner and feigned death. No sooner had the enemy group withdrawn then he was up and firing in all directions. Once more his position was taken and the captors found 2 apparently lifeless bodies. Throughout the night Pfc. Merli stayed at his weapon. By daybreak the enemy had suffered heavy losses, and as our troops launched an assault, asked for a truce. Our negotiating party, who accepted the German surrender, found Pfc. Merli still at his gun. On the battlefield lay 52 enemy dead, 19 of whom were directly in front of the gun. Pfc. Merli's gallantry and courage, and the losses and confusion that he caused the enemy, contributed materially to our victory.

/S/ HARRY S. TRUMAN

== Awards and decorations ==

Badge	Combat Infantryman Badge		
1st row	Medal of Honor		
2nd row	Bronze Star Medal with 1 Oak leaf cluster	Purple Heart with 1 Oak leaf cluster	Army Good Conduct Medal
3rd row	American Campaign Medal	European–African–Middle Eastern Campaign Medal with Arrowhead Device and 3 Campaign stars	World War II Victory Medal
Unit award	Presidential Unit Citation		

== See also ==
- List of Medal of Honor recipients
