= Everett P. Pope =

USMC Medal of Honor recipient (1919–2009)

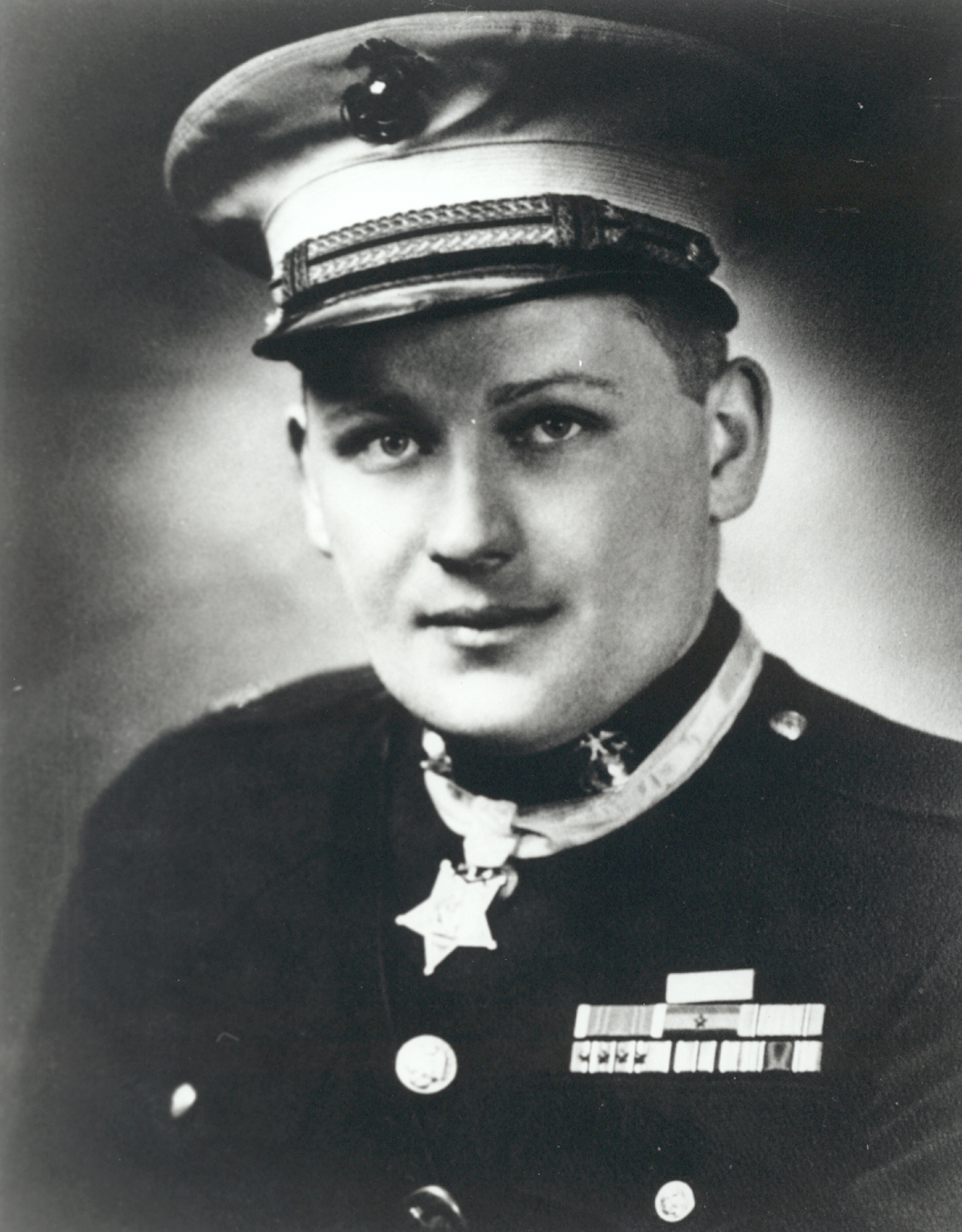
- Major Everett P. Pope, Medal of Honor recipient
- Born: Everett Parker Pope; July 16, 1919; Milton, Massachusetts, US
- Died: July 16, 2009 (aged 90); Bath, Maine, US
- Burial place: Arlington National Cemetery
- Education: Bowdoin College (BS)
- Military career
- Allegiance: United States
- Branch: United States Marine Corps
- Service years: 1941–1951
- Rank: Major
- Units: 1st Battalion, 1st Marines, 1st Marine Division
- Conflicts: World War II; Guadalcanal Campaign; Battle of Cape Gloucester; Battle of Peleliu
- Awards: Medal of Honor; Bronze Star Medal; Purple Heart

Major Everett Parker Pope (July 16, 1919 – July 16, 2009) was a United States Marine who received the Medal of Honor for his conspicuous gallantry on Peleliu in September 1944 while leading his men in an assault on a strategic hill, and for holding it, with rocks and bare fists when ammunition ran low, against Japanese suicide attacks.

== Early life ==
Pope was born on July 16, 1919, in Milton, Massachusetts, the son of Laurence Everett Pope and Ruth Parker Pope. He later moved to North Quincy, where he graduated from North Quincy High School in 1936. He attended Bowdoin College in Brunswick, Maine, and excelled in both academics and athletics. He was the captain of the state-champion tennis team and was a member of the Phi Beta Kappa honor society and the Beta Theta Pi fraternity. Shortly after graduating magna cum laude with a Bachelor of Science degree in French in June 1941, he enlisted in the U.S. Marine Corps.

In about 1942, Pope married his high school sweetheart, Eleanor Hawkins. The couple had two sons, Laurence E. and Ralph H. Pope. Laurence later served as the U.S. Ambassador to Chad.

== Marine Corps career ==
After basic training, Pope attended Officer Candidate School and, on November 1, 1941, was commissioned a second lieutenant in the Marine Corps Reserve. He trained at Quantico, Virginia, and New River, North Carolina, then went overseas in June 1942 with 1st Battalion, 1st Marines. On August 7, 1942, as the leader of a machine gun platoon, he participated in the landing and action at Guadalcanal.

In 1943, he was transferred to Melbourne, Australia, with his unit. Later, he again went into combat, as a company commander with the 1st Marine Regiment, in the Cape Gloucester, New Britain campaign, from December 1943 to April 1944. In the mopping-up operations which followed, he led a 14-man patrol that in one day killed 20 and captured seven enemy soldiers during a 12-mile (19 km) trek over jungle trails.

From September 12 to 30, 1944, he took part in action in the Peleliu campaign during which he acted with "conspicuous gallantry and intrepidity at the risk of his life above and beyond the call of duty", and for which he would later be awarded the Medal of Honor and the Purple Heart. Wounded in action on September 20, he returned to duty the next day, and remained overseas until November 1944.

Pope was promoted to major in January 1945 and assigned for one year as a student in the Japanese language course at Yale University. On July 16, 1946, he was assigned an inactive duty status in the Marine Corps, and returned to his home and private employment in Massachusetts. There he became affiliated with the Marine Corps Reserve and commanded the 2nd Infantry Battalion, USMCR, Hingham, Massachusetts, until August 1950, when he was called to active duty with his battalion upon the outbreak of the Korean War. He served as executive officer of 3rd Battalion, 2nd Marines at Marine Corps Base Camp Lejeune, North Carolina, until September 1951, when he was released to inactive duty and, shortly thereafter, resigned his commission in the Marine Corps.

=== Medal of Honor action ===
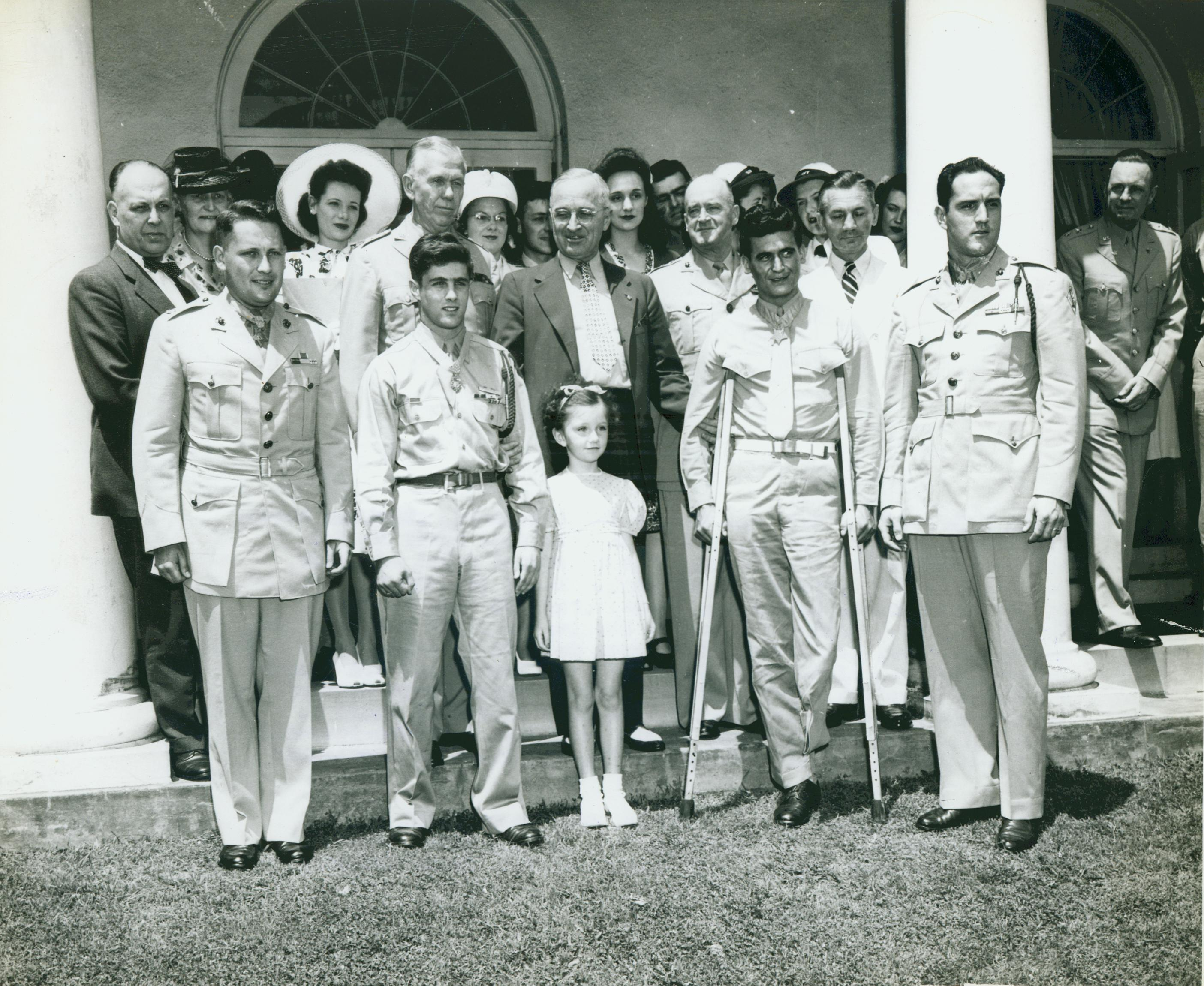
Pope (front row left) at the Medal of Honor presentation (June 15, 1945)

On September 20, 1944, Captain Pope and his company set out to storm Hill 100, the steep and barren coral southern slope of a long ridge that the Japanese dubbed "East Mountain" as it sat to the east of the center of Bloodynose ridge. Initially, the Marines had the support of two M4 Sherman tanks, but on the approach to Hill 100 both of them slipped off of the sides of a narrow causeway, immobilizing them. Miraculously, although this narrow causeway was a prime target for the Japanese, all of Captain Pope's men managed to run across it without sustaining any casualties. Heavy fire from adjacent ridges across Horseshoe Valley to the West and Southwest plagued the Marines at the base of the hill and continued to do so as they made their steady ascent. Upon reaching the peak of Hill 100 and sustaining over 60 casualties in the process, the Marines realized that their maps were wrong and that "hill" 100 was actually a very long and narrow ridge with high ground and Japanese positions several yards to their north. From almost point-blank range, Japanese mortars and field guns opened up on them from atop the ridge as well as from the adjacent peaks and hills in the surrounding area. Pope and his men took Hill 100 at dusk after hours of bloody fighting that nearly annihilated the group.

Forced to deploy his men thinly, he nevertheless determined to hold his ground for the night. Immediately after darkness fell, the Japanese started to attack, first in small infiltrating bands, then in groups of 20 to 25. Each time, the Marines opened fire with everything they had: one light machine gun, several Tommy guns and rifles, and a limited supply of hand grenades. When the grenades ran low, they hurled rocks. "We would throw three or four rocks, then a grenade. The Japanese didn't know which were which," one Marine said. By sunrise, the Marines were beating off the enemy with bare fists and hurling ammunition boxes at them. Finally only eight riflemen remained. When daylight brought deadly Japanese artillery fire, Pope was ordered to withdraw and did so under the cover of smoke shells.

For these actions, Pope was presented with the Medal of Honor by President Harry Truman during a White House ceremony on June 15, 1945, which included presentations to fellow Marine recipients Luther Skaggs Jr. and Carlton R. Rouh, as well as Army recipient Gino J. Merli, for their heroism during actions in the Central Pacific and European theatres. It was Truman's first Medal of Honor presentation, and he told Pope that he would rather have the medal than be president.

== Later life ==
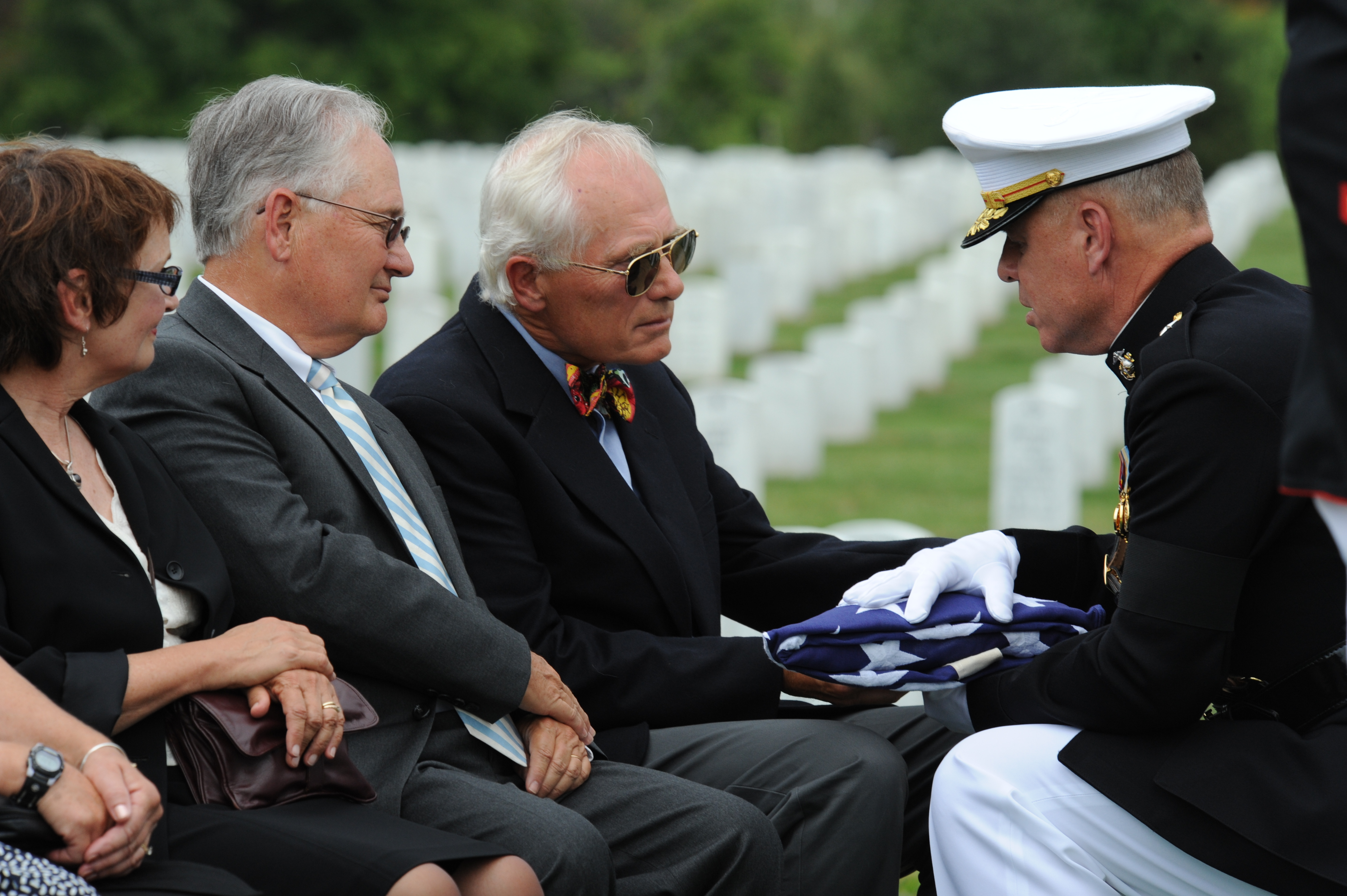
Pope's two sons accept a folded flag during their father's burial ceremony at Arlington National Cemetery.

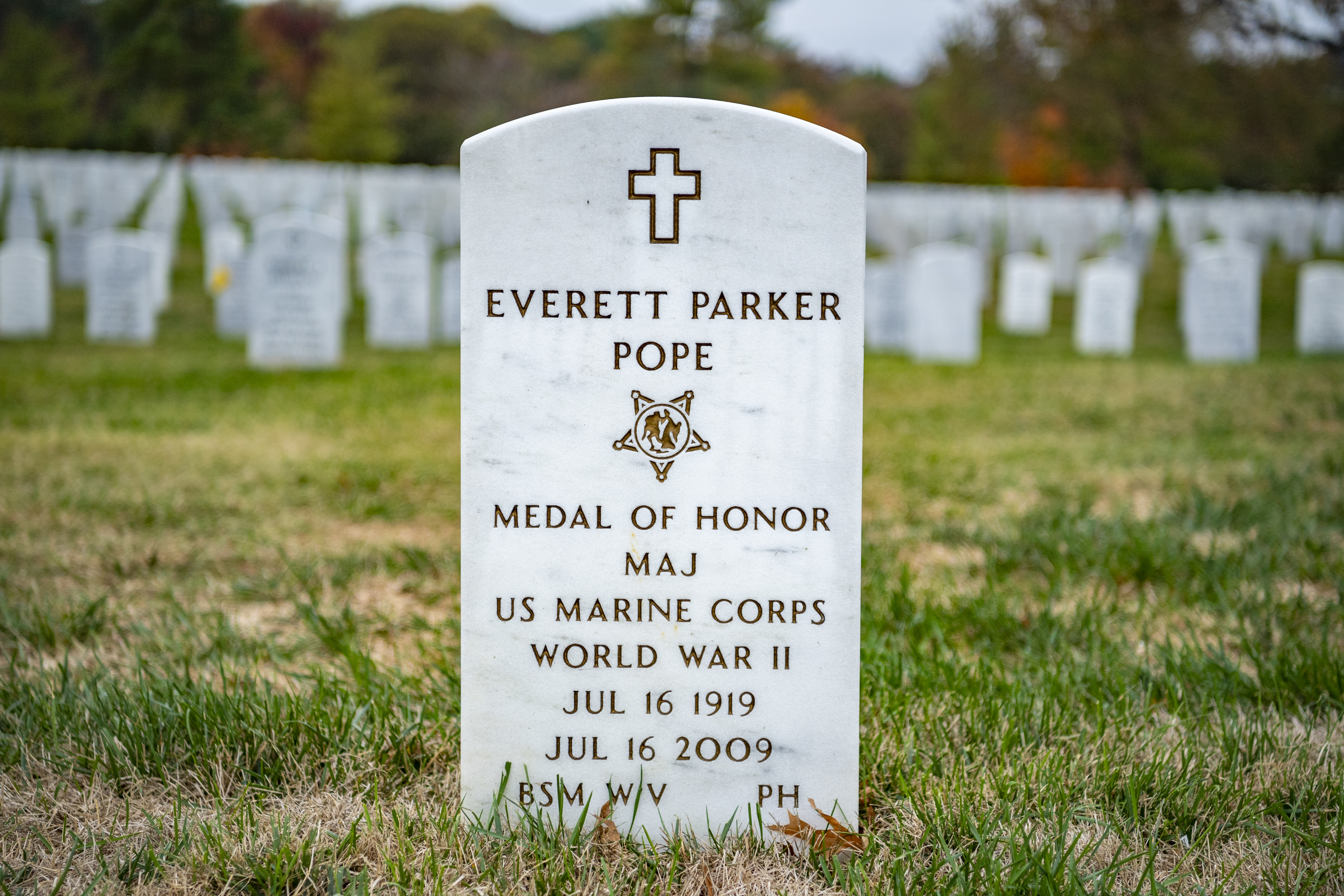
Grave at Arlington National Cemetery

After his military service, Pope began a career as a banker. He was president of the Workmen's Co-operative Bank in Boston, Massachusetts, for more than 25 years beginning in 1953. At the start of his tenure, he was the youngest bank president in New England at age 34. He worked in savings and loans and supported the federal student loan program, serving in 1982 as the first chairman of the board of Massachusetts Higher Education Assistance Corporation. After retiring in 1983, he returned to Brunswick, Maine, and lived near his alma mater, Bowdoin College.

He was active on Bowdoin's governing boards for 27 years, from 1961 to 1988, serving as president of the board of overseers and chair of the board of trustees. He established the Pope Scholarship Fund in the 1980s and, with other Bowdoin alumni, established the Haldane Cup, an award presented to a senior who demonstrates the leadership and character of Marine Corps Captain Andrew Haldane. Haldane, who was killed in the Battle of Peleliu, was the captain of the 1940 Bowdoin football team and a classmate of Pope. In 1987, the school awarded Pope an honorary Doctor of Laws degree.

Pope and his wife Eleanor lived on Amelia Island in Florida and on Great Pond in Belgrade Lakes, Maine, before failing health spurred them to return to the midcoast area of Maine to be nearer their sons. The couple entered the Hill House assisted-living facility in Bath in September 2008. His wife died there in January 2009, and Pope himself died six months later, on the morning of his 90th birthday. Everett and Eleanor Pope were cremated and, on September 15, 2009, buried together at Arlington National Cemetery.

== Medal of Honor citation ==
The President of the United States takes pleasure in presenting the MEDAL OF HONOR to

CAPTAIN EVERETT P. POPE
UNITED STATES MARINE CORPS

for service as set forth in the following CITATION:

For conspicuous gallantry and intrepidity at the risk of his life above and beyond the call of duty while serving as Commanding Officer of Company C, First Battalion, First Marines, First Marine Division, during action against enemy Japanese forces on Peleliu Island, Palau Group, on 19–20 September 1944. Subjected to point-blank cannon fire which caused heavy casualties and badly disorganized his company while assaulting a steep coral hill, Captain Pope rallied his men and gallantly led them to the summit in the face of machine-gun, mortar, and sniper fire. Forced by widespread hostile attack to deploy the remnants of his company thinly in order to hold the ground won, and with his machine-guns out of action and insufficient water and ammunition, he remained on the exposed hill with twelve men and one wounded officer, determined to hold through the night. Attacked continuously with grenades, machine-guns, and rifles from three sides and twice subjected to suicidal charges during the night, he and his valiant men fiercely beat back or destroyed the enemy, resorting to hand-to-hand combat as the supply of ammunition dwindled and still maintaining his lines with his eight remaining riflemen when daylight brought more deadly fire and he was ordered to withdraw. His valiant leadership against devastating odds while protecting the units below from heavy Japanese attack reflects the highest credit upon Captain Pope and the United States Naval Service

/S/ FRANKLIN D. ROOSEVELT

== Awards and decorations ==

| 1st row | Medal of Honor | | |
| 2nd row | Bronze Star Medal with "V" Device | Purple Heart | Combat Action Ribbon Retroactively Awarded, 1999 |
| 3rd row | Presidential Unit Citation with 1 Service star | American Defense Service Medal | American Campaign Medal |
| 4th row | Asiatic-Pacific Campaign Medal with 4 Campaign stars | World War II Victory Medal | National Defense Service Medal |

== See also ==
- List of Medal of Honor recipients
- List of Medal of Honor recipients for World War II
