= USS Herbert J. Thomas =

Gearing-class destroyer

Coordinates: 23.0912713°N 120.5354969°E

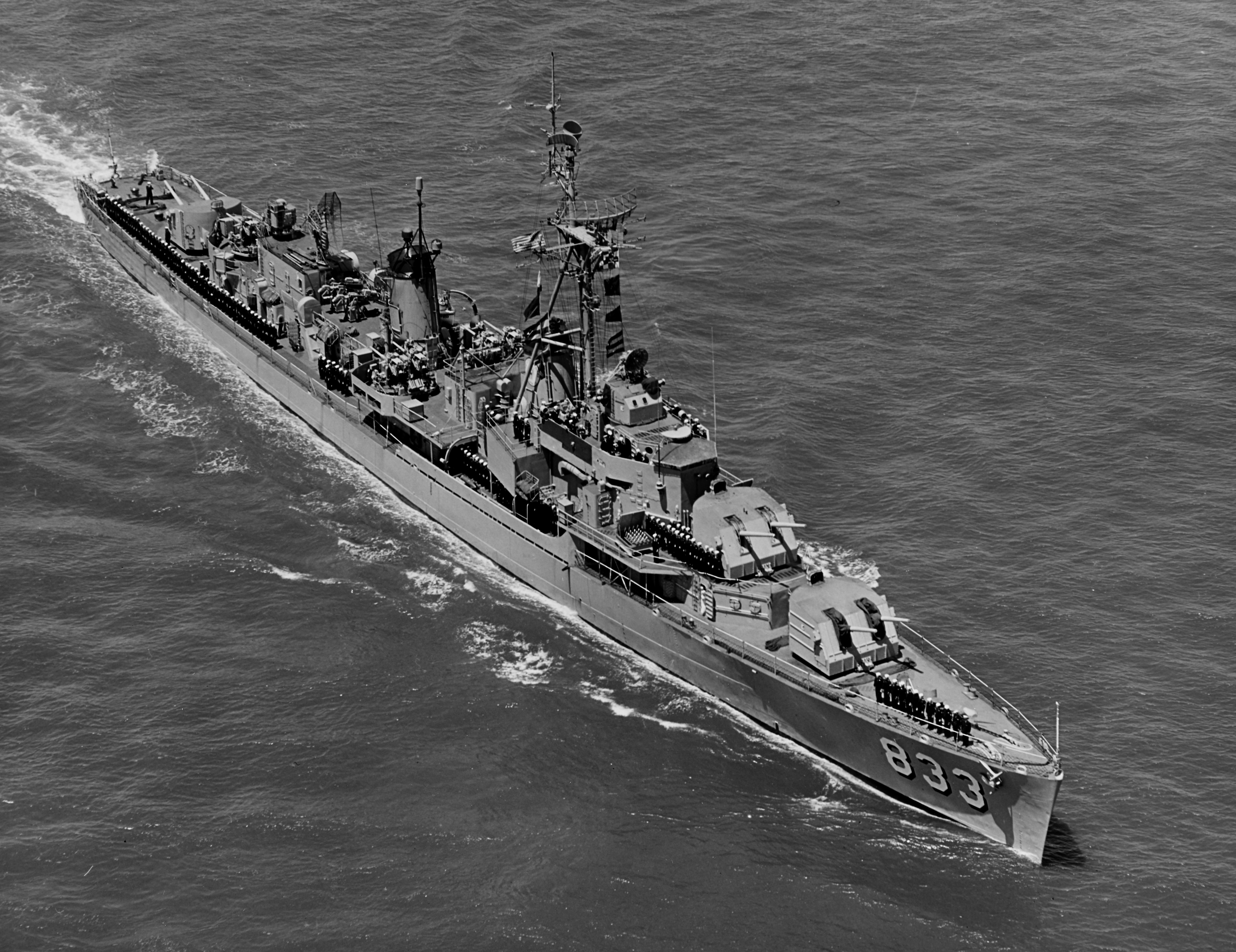
- USS Herbert J. Thomas underway on 13 June 1957

History

United States
- Name: Herbert J. Thomas
- Namesake: Herbert Joseph Thomas
- Builder: Bath Iron Works
- Laid down: 30 October 1944
- Launched: 25 March 1945
- Sponsored by: Mrs. Audrey Irene Thomas
- Commissioned: 29 May 1945
- Reclassified: DDR-833, 18 March 1949; DD-833, 1 April 1964
- Identification: Callsign: NBBC; Hull number: DD-833
- Decommissioned: 4 December 1970
- Stricken: 1 February 1974
- Honors and awards: See Awards
- Fate: Transferred to Republic of China, 1 June 1974

History

Taiwan
- Name: Han Yang (漢陽)
- Namesake: Han Yang
- Acquired: 1 June 1974
- Commissioned: 17 March 1975
- Reclassified: DDG-915, 1980s
- Identification: Hull number: DD-915
- Decommissioned: 16 August 1999
- Fate: Sunk as artificial reef

General characteristics
- Class & type: Gearing-class destroyer
- Displacement: 3,460 long tons (3,516 t) full
- Length: 390 ft 6 in (119.02 m)
- Beam: 40 ft 10 in (12.45 m)
- Draft: 14 ft 4 in (4.37 m)
- Propulsion: Geared turbines, 2 shafts, 60,000 shp (45 MW)
- Speed: 36.8 knots (68.2 km/h; 42.3 mph)
- Range: 4,500 nmi (8,300 km) at 20 kn (37 km/h; 23 mph)
- Complement: 336
- Armament: 6 × 5-inch/38-caliber guns (3×2); 12 × 40 mm AA guns; 11 × 20 mm AA guns; 10 × 21 inch (533 mm) torpedo tubes (2×5); 6 × depth charge projectors; 2 × depth charge tracks

USS Herbert J. Thomas (DD-833) was a Gearing-class destroyer of the United States Navy.

== Construction and career ==
Named for Sergeant Herbert Joseph Thomas Jr., USMC, she was laid down on 30 October 1944 by Bath Iron Works Corporation, Bath, Maine; launched on 25 March 1945; sponsored by Miss Audrey Irene Thomas, sister of Sergeant Thomas; and commissioned on 29 May 1945.

=== Service in the United States Navy ===
After shakedown along the East Coast and in the Caribbean, Herbert J. Thomas transited the Panama Canal and joined the Western Pacific Forces supporting the occupation of Japan and Korea at war's end.

After operations with the 7th Fleet out of Japan during most of 1946 and patrol duty in Korean waters, she sailed late November via Guam and Pearl Harbor, arriving San Diego on 21 December. Herbert J. Thomas sailed on 6 January 1947 via the Canal Zone arriving at Newport, Rhode Island on 6 February. Between February 1947 and 22 May 1950 she conducted operations along the East Coast and in the Caribbean and made three deployments with the 6th Fleet to the Mediterranean. During the latter part of 1948 she was assigned duty as a United States Naval Academy practice ship, giving six-day anti-submarine indoctrinations. Herbert J. Thomas was reclassified DDR-833 on 18 March 1949.

==== Korean War ====
Herbert J. Thomas had just returned from the Mediterranean and was in Cartagena, Colombia when hostilities broke out in Korea in June 1950. She immediately proceeded to Pearl Harbor and joined the Pacific Fleet. In July she joined Task Force 77 (7th Fleet Striking Force) operating off the coast of Korea in the Yellow Sea, effectively checking the enemy. A month later Herbert J. Thomas was assigned to the blockading force on Korea's east coast, and rendered highly effective gunfire support missions for our forces at Pohang, inflicting much damage on the enemy. While operating with the blockading forces, she furnished interdiction fire all along the eastern coast and fired a diversionary mission for British commandos who were landed from submarine Perch (SS-176) to destroy a vital railroad tunnel.

At 1329 on the afternoon of 4 September, Herbert J. Thomas was on picket duty about 60 miles north of Admiral Ewen's main force when she made radar contact on unidentified aircraft and reported this to aircraft from Valley Forge (CV-45) passing overhead. A division of F4U Corsairs which was orbiting northeast of the force was vectored out. The raid was now estimated on course 160°, speed 180 knots. As the fighters turned to meet it, it separated into two parts, one retiring in the direction whence it came. Sighting the fighters, the bogey nosed down, increased speed and began evasive action, but turned toward Korea rather than westward toward China. The division leader flew over him in an attempt to identify and reported a twin-engined bomber with red star markings. The intruder opened fire and was subsequently shot down. Herbert J. Thomas proceeded to the spot where the aircraft crashed and, according to a crew member on the Herbert J. Thomas at the time, recovered the dead body of an oriental aviator, and was immediately transferred to the USS Valley Forge.

For the next three months she was assigned patrol duty and operations with Task Force 77. Departing 24 January 1951 Herbert J. Thomas arrived San Diego on 12 February and spent the remainder of the year operating in that area. Returning to Korea on 25 January 1952 she joined Task Force 77 for a month and spent two weeks on the bombline performing vital gunfire support and screening duties. In late February, Herbert J. Thomas took up patrol duty in the Formosa Straits and in April was assigned duty in the Songjin area. In this she coordinated the operations of several ships in the Songjin-Chongjin area.

After a brief period with the 7th Fleet Striking Force she joined the Blockading and Escort Force off the east coast of Korea. On 11 May she dueled with shore batteries in Wonsan Harbor where she received one hit with no casualties and slight damage. Quick to retaliate, Herbert J. Thomas dealt severely with the enemy, inflicting much damage. The remainder of the month was spent on patrol, bombarding and furnishing fire support for mine-sweeping operations in the Serisan, Songjin, and Chongjin areas.

Retiring to Yokosuka, Herbert J. Thomas sailed on 8 June for San Diego, arriving on the 26th. Assigned the new home-port of Long Beach, California she operated in that area until departing on 2 February 1953 for duty with the Far Eastern Naval Forces. Arriving Yokosuka on 27 February, Herbert J. Thomas joined the 7th Fleet Striking Force and screened the carriers launching strikes on North Korea. From 4 April to 19 May she was assigned electronics countermeasure duties in addition to call fire missions on gun emplacements and radar stations, effectively checking the enemy.

Herbert J. Thomas joined Task Force 72 on 12 June and operated out of Kaoshiung, Formosa enforcing the blockade between Formosa and the communist China. Sailing from Yokosuka on 14 August she reached Long Beach on 30 August, from whence she proceeded to Mare Island for overhaul and armament conversion. Herbert J. Thomas departed on 5 May 1954 for her fourth tour in the Far East. After operating in the Philippines and out of Yokosuka, she proceeded on 23 July to Kaoshiung to take up patrol duty. Returning to Long Beach on 5 December, she spent the next five months operating with the carrier Kearsarge (CV-33) in that area. From 14 June 1955 to 1 March 1958 Herbert J. Thomas made three more deployments to the Far East. During these tours she operated with the fast carrier task forces and had duty on the Taiwan Patrol, helping to stabilize the Chinese situation and protect vital American interests.

On 25 October 1958 Herbert J. Thomas deployed again with other units of the 7th Fleet to the Far East, serving with pride as a good-will ambassador for the United States. She trained with Japanese destroyers in antisubmarine exercises and operated again with fast carrier groups. On 4 July 1959 the Herbert J. Thomas represented the United States Navy by firing a twenty-one-gun salute at the Alaska statehood ceremony in Sitka. Upon entry to the harbor, the Thomas dropped anchor in waters at least one fathom greater than the length of its anchor chain. And, due to a hang-fire, the ship actually gave Alaska a twenty-two-gun salute. The ship deployed regularly to the Far East until 9 July 1963 when she entered Mare Island Naval Shipyard, Vallejo, California and remained in commission in reserve for a 12½-month modernization overhaul. During the FRAM I conversion, the destroyer received an entirely new superstructure – designed to protect the ship against biological and chemical agents as well as radioactive fallout – and the Antisubmarine Rocket (RUR-5 ASROC) system.

==== Vietnam War ====
Returning to full commission on 31 July 1965, Herbert J. Thomas completed her FRAM I conversion on 30 August (reverting to DD-833 on 1 April 1964) and operated along the West Coast until sailing for the Far East on 14 September 1966. Arriving at "Yankee Station" off South Vietnam on 16 October, she joined CTG 77.7 in screening Franklin D. Roosevelt (CVA-42) during strikes against communist targets ashore. She retired toward the Philippines on 16 November, arriving Subic Bay three days later en route to Taiwan for patrol duty in the Strait of Formosa on 24 November through 16 December. Back off Vietnam on 19 December, Herbert J. Thomas aided ground forces with three weeks of naval gunfire support.

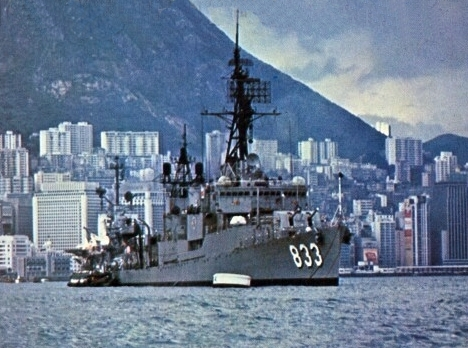
USS Herbert J. Thomas at Hong Kong, in 1969.

Following a short period of carrier escort duty on "Yankee Station" in mid-January, Herbert J. Thomas sailed for home on 5 February 1967 arriving in San Diego via Yokosuka on the 24th. After leave and upkeep, the warship conducted refresher training and local operations through the summer and fall.

The destroyer departed California for a Far East cruise on 28 December. On 19 January, after stopping for fuel, the Thomas departed Pearl Harbor en route to Yokosuka, Japan. However, plans were soon changed. On 23 January, North Korean forces seized the USS Pueblo in the Sea of Japan and took the ship into Wonsan Harbor. The Thomas was ordered to divert from Yokosuka and to join up with the US forces, including the carriers Enterprise, Yorktown, and Ticonderoga, which were assembling in the Sea of Japan. On 1 February, the Thomas entered the Sea of Japan via the Korean Strait and began operating with the carrier USS Yorktown. The Thomas had to go to Sasebo, Japan, from 8 to 12 February to repair the fresh water evaporator, but quickly returned to the Sea of Japan and remained on station there until 1 March when she departed and headed for Subic Bay.

Arriving at "Yankee Station" via Japan and the Philippines on 14 March 1968. The warship conducted shore bombardment missions off II and III Corps areas of responsibility in April and May as part of the Vietnamese counter-offensive after Tet, targeting enemy concentrations ashore. The destroyer also conducted patrols off Taiwan in June before sailing home on 15 June, arriving in San Diego via Sasebo on 5 July. Herbert J. Thomas spent the last three months of the year in overhaul at Long Beach.

After completing refresher training that spring, the destroyer departed San Diego for her next Western Pacific deployment on 4 June 1969. Arriving in the Tonkin Gulf on 3 July, Herbert J. Thomas began three weeks of positive identification and radar advisory zone (PIRAZ) duty (air traffic coordination) as well as the occasional shore bombardment mission. Following a port visit to Sasebo in early August, the warship conducted another three-week PIRAZ tour before putting in at Hong Kong on 15 September. She conducted one more shore bombardment patrol in October before turning for home on 1 November, arriving in San Diego via Subic Bay, Guam, Midway, and Pearl Harbor on 23 November.

In the summer of 1970, Herbert J. Thomas served as a school and training ship for NROTC midshipmen. In late August, the warship failed a final service inspection and was immediately tapped for inactivation. Herbert J. Thomas was decommissioned at San Diego on 4 December 1970.

She was struck from the Naval Vessel Register on 1 February 1974 and transferred to the Republic of China through the Security Assistance Program (SAP) on 1 June 1974.

=== Service in the Republic of China Navy ===
The destroyer served in the Republic of China Navy as ROCS Han Yang (DD-915) on 17 March 1975.

In the 1980s, she underwent the Wu-Chin II modernization program and reclassified as DDG-915.

She was retired on 16 August 1999 and sunk as an artificial reef.

Her mast is on display at the Yuanzhiluxiuxian Park, Tainan.

== Awards ==
- Herbert J. Thomas received six Battle Stars for Korean War service and three Battle Stars for Vietnam service.
