= Texas Medal of Honor Memorial =

Statue commemorating recipients of the Medal of Honor from the state of Texas

Coordinates: 33.6950°N 97.5215°W

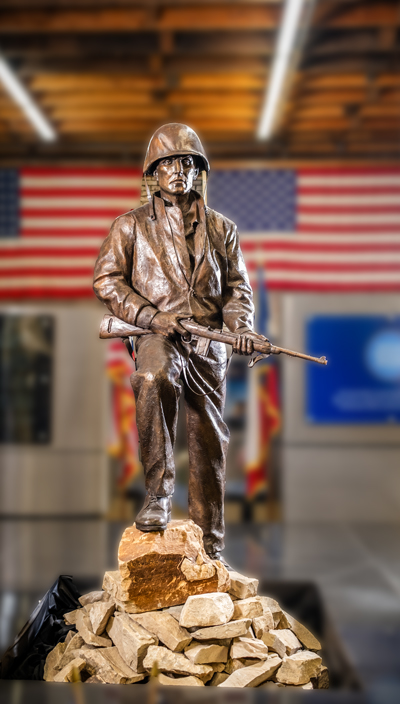
- Artist: Doyle Glass
- Year: 2008
- Location: International Artillery Museum, Saint Jo, Texas
- Owner: Doyle Glass

The Texas Medal of Honor Memorial is a statue commemorating recipients of the Medal of Honor from the state of Texas. Sculpted by Doyle Glass and Scott Boyer, it was dedicated on Memorial Day of 2008 in Midland, Texas at the Commemorative Air Force International Headquarters. In July 2018 the Memorial was assigned to the Ground Forces Detachment of the Commemorative Air Force and moved to Gainesville, Texas. Since May of 2021 it is currently on display at the International Artillery Museum in Saint Jo, Texas and open to the public.

The Memorial depicts Medal of Honor recipient George H. O'Brien, Jr. as he would appear on the day he earned the Medal of Honor for his service during the Korean War. Perched on a rock, the heroic-sized bronze figure rises above a granite base, which displays the names of most recipients of the medal from Texas. The Model for this statue was Buck Hartlage a Louisville Kentucky native.

== See also ==
- Medal of Honor Memorial (Indianapolis)
- Kentucky Medal of Honor Memorial
- Oregon Veterans Medal of Honor Memorial
