= John C. Squires =

United States Army Medal of Honor recipient

John Charles Squires
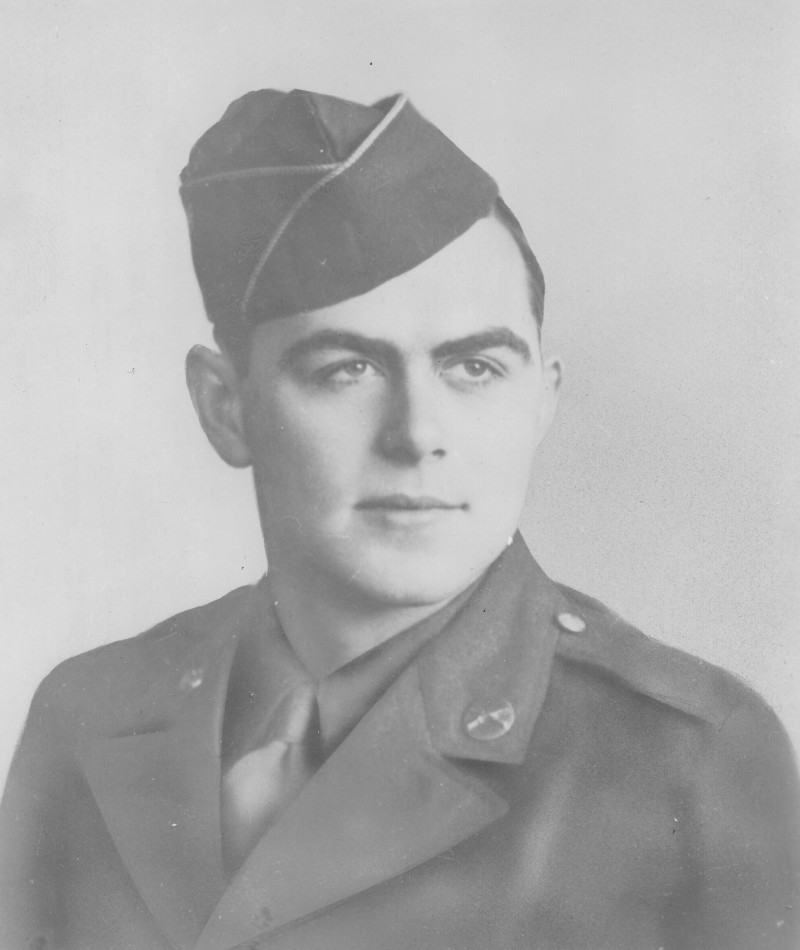
- Born: May 19, 1925; Louisville, Kentucky, U.S.
- Died: May 23, 1944 (aged 19) near Padiglione, Ancona, Italy
- Burial place: Zachary Taylor National Cemetery, Louisville, Kentucky
- Military career
- Allegiance: United States
- Branch: United States Army
- Service years: 1943–1944
- Rank: Sergeant
- Units: 30th Infantry Regiment, 3rd Infantry Division
- Conflicts: World War II
- Awards: Medal of Honor; Purple Heart

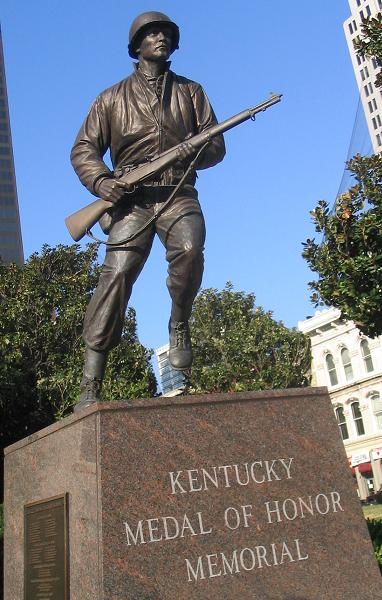
Kentucky Medal of Honor memorial, featuring a statue of Squires

John Charles Squires (May 19, 1925 – May 23, 1944) was a United States Army soldier and a recipient of the United States military's highest decoration—the Medal of Honor—for his actions in World War II.

Squires joined the Army from his birth city of Louisville, Kentucky, in July 1943, and by April 23, 1944, was serving as a private first class in Company A, 30th Infantry Regiment, 3rd Infantry Division. During a battle on that day, near Padiglione, Italy, he repeatedly braved enemy fire to carry messages, bring up reinforcements, and fight the Germans throughout the night and into the next morning. Squires was killed in action a month later, after having been promoted to Sergeant. He was posthumously awarded the Medal of Honor on October 2, 1944.

Squires, aged 19 at his death, was buried in Zachary Taylor National Cemetery in his hometown of Louisville, Kentucky. In 2001, a memorial honoring Medal of Honor recipients from Kentucky was dedicated in Louisville. The memorial features a six-foot-tall bronze statue of Squires.

== Medal of Honor citation ==
Sergeant Squires' official Medal of Honor citation reads:

For conspicuous gallantry and intrepidity at risk of life above and beyond the call of duty. At the start of his company's attack on strongly held enemy positions in and around Spaccasassi Creek, near Padiglione, Italy, on the night of 23-April 24, 1944, Pfc. Squires, platoon messenger, participating in his first offensive action, braved intense artillery, mortar, and antitank gun fire in order to investigate the effects of an antitank mine explosion on the leading platoon. Despite shells which burst close to him, Pfc. Squires made his way 50 yards forward to the advance element, noted the situation, reconnoitered a new route of advance and informed his platoon leader of the casualties sustained and the alternate route. Acting without orders, he rounded up stragglers, organized a group of lost men into a squad and led them forward. When the platoon reached Spaccasassi Creek and established an outpost, Pfc. Squires, knowing that almost all of the noncommissioned officers were casualties, placed 8 men in position of his own volition, disregarding enemy machinegun, machine-pistol, and grenade fire which covered the creek draw. When his platoon had been reduced to 14 men, he brought up reinforcements twice. On each trip he went through barbed wire and across an enemy minefield, under intense artillery and mortar fire. Three times in the early morning the outpost was counterattacked. Each time Pfc. Squires ignored withering enemy automatic fire and grenades which struck all around him, and fired hundreds of rounds of rifle, Browning automatic rifle, and captured German Spandau machinegun ammunition at the enemy, inflicting numerous casualties and materially aiding in repulsing the attacks. Following these fights, he moved 50 yards to the south end of the outpost and engaged 21 German soldiers in individual machinegun duels at point-blank range, forcing all 21 enemy to surrender and capturing 13 more Spandau guns. Learning the function of this weapon by questioning a German officer prisoner, he placed the captured guns in position and instructed other members of his platoon in their operation. The next night when the Germans attacked the outpost again he killed 3 and wounded more Germans with captured potato-masher grenades and fire from his Spandau gun. Pfc. Squires was killed in a subsequent action.

== See also ==
- List of Medal of Honor recipients
- List of Medal of Honor recipients for World War II
