= Kingston, Kentucky =

Unincorporated community in Kentucky, United States

- Unincorporated community
- Location within Kentucky Location within the United States
- Coordinates: 37°39′1″N 84°14′29″W
- Country: United States
- State: Kentucky
- County: Madison
- Elevation: 925 ft (282 m)
- Time zone: UTC-5 (Eastern (EST))
  - Summer (DST): UTC-4 (EDT)
- ZIP code: 40385
- Area code: 859
- GNIS feature ID: 495769

Kingston is an unincorporated community located in Madison County, Kentucky, United States. The community is part of the Richmond–Berea Micropolitan Statistical Area. It is located at the junction of US Route 421, Kentucky Route 499 and Kentucky Route 3376. Kingston is also home to Kingston Elementary School

== History ==
Kingston was involved in the Battle of Richmond during the American Civil War.
