= Luther Skaggs Jr. =

USMC Medal of Honor recipient (1923–1976)

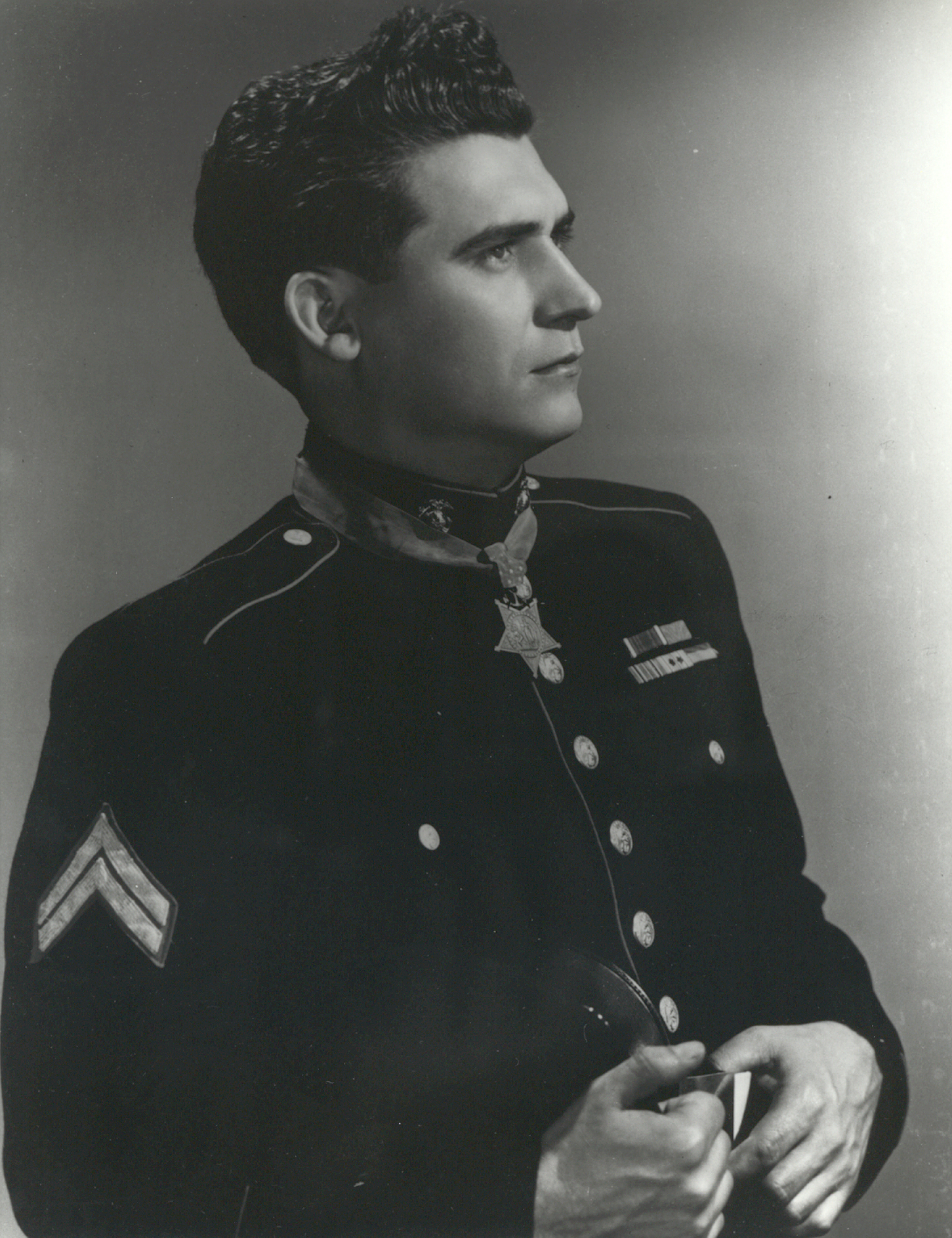
- Cpl Luther Skaggs Jr., Medal of Honor recipient
- Born: March 3, 1923; Henderson, Kentucky
- Died: April 6, 1976 (aged 53); Sarasota, Florida
- Burial place: Arlington National Cemetery
- Military career
- Allegiance: United States of America
- Branch: United States Marine Corps
- Service years: 1942–1946
- Rank: Corporal
- Units: 3rd Battalion, 3rd Marines, 3rd Marine Division
- Conflicts: World War II: Battle of Guam
- Awards: Medal of Honor; Purple Heart

Luther Skaggs Jr. (March 3, 1923 – April 6, 1976) was a United States Marine who received the Medal of Honor for his heroic actions on the beachhead in Guam as at the World War II.

== Biography ==
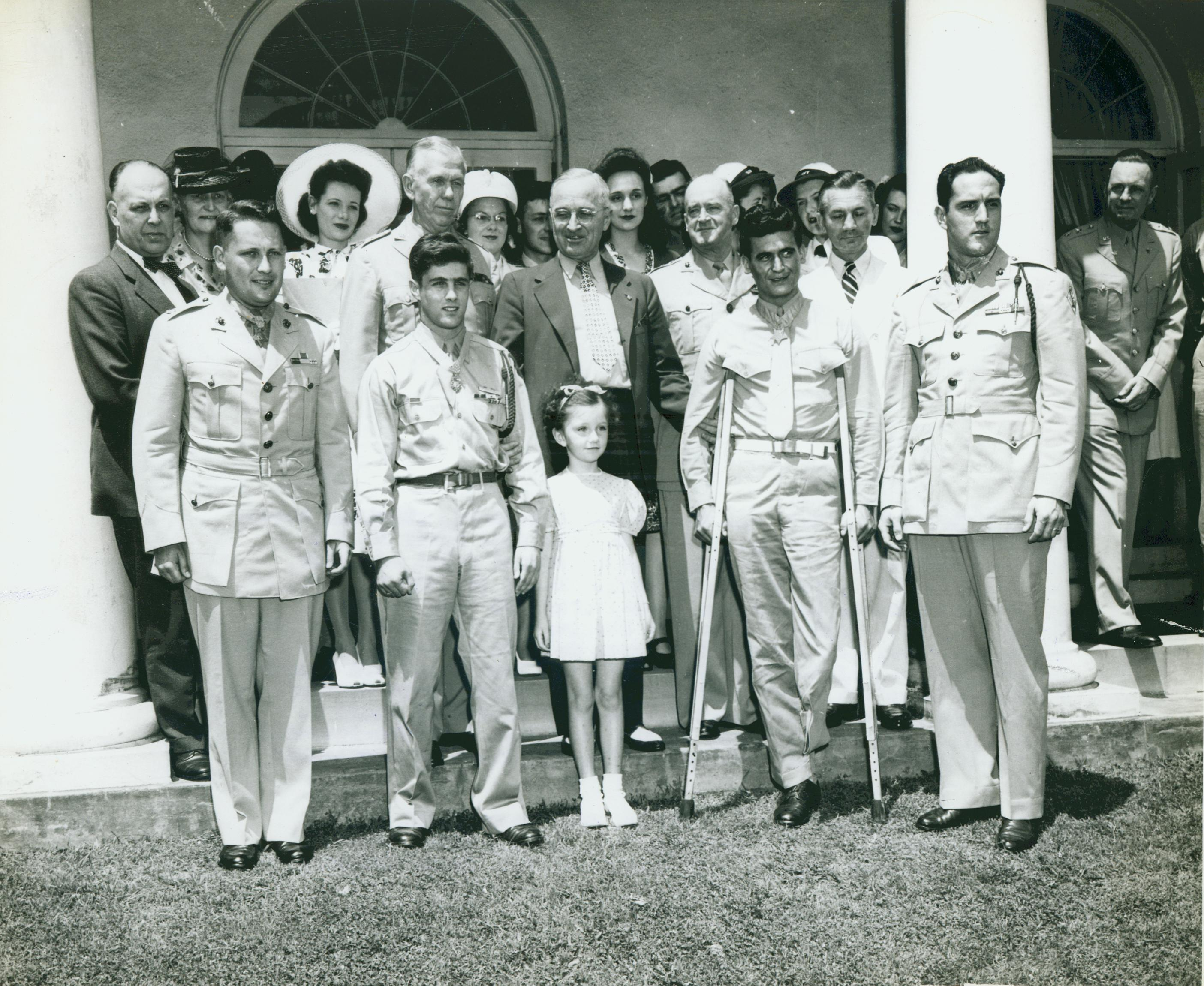
Skaggs (front row, with crutches) at the Medal of Honor presentation, flanked by fellow recipients (l. to r.) Everett P. Pope, Gino J. Merli, and Carlton R. Rouh, with President Truman and Rouh's niece at center (June 15, 1945)

Luther Skaggs Jr. was born on March 3, 1923, in Henderson, Kentucky. He entered the Marine Corps on October 6, 1942, and received recruit training at Parris Island, South Carolina, and Camp Lejeune, North Carolina. He was deployed overseas on March 1, 1943. Private First Class Skaggs, a squad leader with a weapon section in the 3rd Marine Division, was critically wounded when a Japanese grenade exploded in his foxhole during the night of 21–22 July 1944 on the Asan-Adelup beachhead in Guam. But instead of calling a corpsman and revealing his outfit's position, he calmly applied a tourniquet to his shattered leg and, for eight hours, continued to return the enemy's fire with his rifle and hand grenades.

In his Medal of Honor citation, Skaggs is commended for being uncomplaining and calm through this critical period and serving as "a heroic example of courage and fortitude to other wounded men."

When his section leader became a casualty shortly after landing on the beachhead, PFC Skaggs promptly took over and led the section through intense fire for a distance of 200 yards to a strategic position.

It was while defending this vital position that he was wounded, and after fighting throughout the night propped up in his foxhole, he crawled unassisted to the rear where he continued the attack. Only when the Japanese in the area had been annihilated did he seek medical attention. He lost his leg as a result of the wound.

Private First Class Skaggs was referred to as a "tough little guy" by his buddies, who did not know that he had been hit until the battle was over. He was promoted to corporal upon being honorably discharged from active service in the Marine Corps on April 4, 1946.

The Medal of Honor was presented to him by President Harry S. Truman at a White House ceremony on June 15, 1945, which included presentations to fellow Marine recipients Everett P. Pope and Carlton R. Rouh, as well as Army recipient Gino J. Merli, for their heroism during actions in the Central Pacific and European theatres.

Luther Skaggs Jr. died on April 6, 1976, and was buried in Arlington National Cemetery with full military honors.

== Medal of Honor citation ==
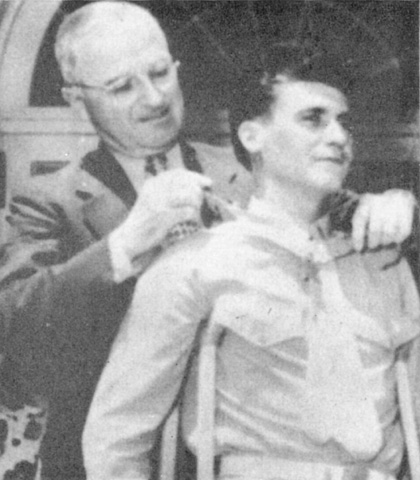
Luther Skaggs Jr. receiving the Medal of Honor from President Harry S. Truman

The President of the United States takes pride in presenting the MEDAL OF HONOR to

PRIVATE FIRST CLASS LUTHER SKAGGS JR.
UNITED STATES MARINE CORPS RESERVE

for service as set forth in the following CITATION:

For conspicuous gallantry and intrepidity at the risk of his life above and beyond the call of duty while serving as Squad Leader with a Mortar Section of Kilo Company in the Third Battalion, Third Marines, Third Marine Division, during action against enemy Japanese forces on the Asan-Adelup Beachhead, Guam, Marianas Islands, on 21–22 July 1944. When the section leader became a casualty under a heavy mortar barrage shortly after landing, Private First Class Skaggs promptly assumed command and led the section through intense fire for a distance of 200 yards to a position from which to deliver effective coverage of the assault on a strategic cliff. Valiantly defending this vital position against strong enemy counterattacks during the night, Private First Class Skaggs was critically wounded when a Japanese grenade lodged in his foxhole and exploded, shattering the lower part of one leg. Quick to act, he applied an improvised tourniquet and, while propped up in his foxhole, gallantly returned the enemy's fire with his rifle and hand grenades for a period of eight hours, later crawling unassisted to the rear to continue to fight until the Japanese had been annihilated. Uncomplaining and calm throughout this critical period, Private First Class Skaggs served as a heroic example of courage and fortitude to other wounded men and, by his courageous leadership and inspiring devotion to duty, upheld the highest traditions for the United States Naval Service.

/S/ FRANKLIN D. ROOSEVELT

== See also ==
- List of Medal of Honor recipients
- List of Medal of Honor recipients for World War II
