= Kenneth Good =

Kenneth Good may refer to:

- Kenneth Good (anthropologist) (born 1942), American anthropologist
- Kenneth N. Good (1930–1963), U.S. Army advisor in South Vietnam, killed in action at the Battle of Ap Bac
- Ken Good (Kenneth Raymond Good, born 1952), Irish Anglican bishop
- Kenneth Good (political scientist) (1933–2020), Australian political scientist
- Ken Good (priest) (1941–2025), English Anglican priest
