= Douglas E. Dickey =

Douglas Eugene Dickey
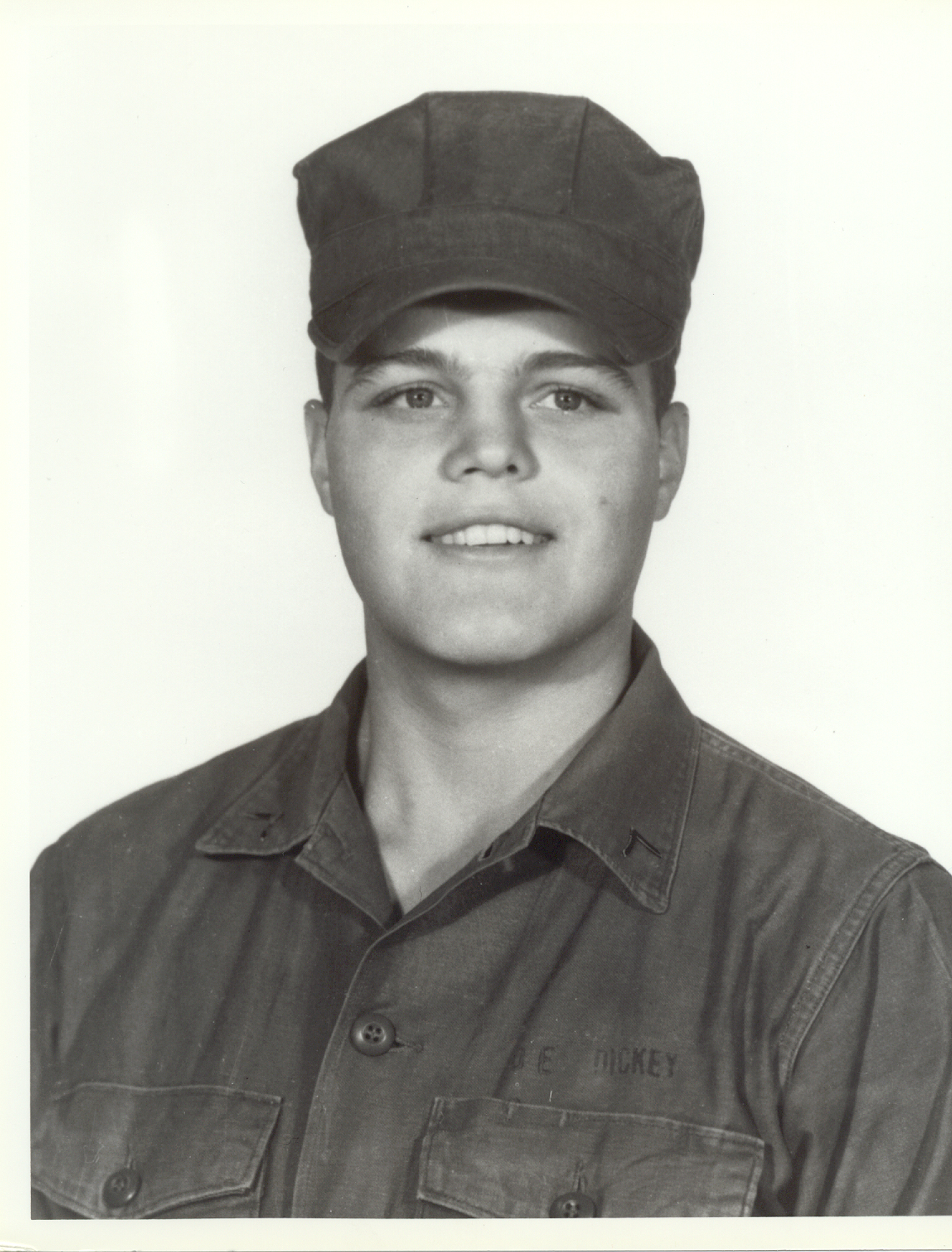
- Douglas E. Dickey, Medal of Honor recipient
- Born: December 24, 1946; Greenville, Ohio, U.S.
- Died: March 26, 1967 (aged 20); Quang Tri Province, South Vietnam
- Burial place: Brock Cemetery, Greenville, Ohio
- Military career
- Allegiance: United States of America
- Branch: United States Marine Corps
- Service years: 1965–1967
- Rank: Private First Class
- Unit: 1st Battalion, 4th Marines
- Conflicts: Vietnam War †: Operation Desoto
- Awards: Medal of Honor (1967); Purple Heart

Private First Class Douglas Eugene Dickey (December 24, 1946 – March 26, 1967) was a United States Marine who posthumously received the Medal of Honor for heroism during Operation Beacon Hill 1, on March 26, 1967, while serving as a rifleman with Company C, 1st Battalion, 4th Marines, 9th Marine Amphibious Brigade, 3rd Marine Division, in the Republic of Vietnam. During a battle, he threw himself upon an enemy grenade, absorbing the blast to save several of his fellow Marines.

== Biography ==
Douglas Dickey was born on December 24, 1946, in Greenville, Ohio. He graduated from grammar school in 1961, and from high school in 1965.

On December 13, 1965, Dickey enlisted in the U.S. Marine Corps Reserve at Cincinnati, Ohio, and was discharged to re-enlist in the Regular Marine Corps on April 11, 1966.

In June 1966, after completing recruit training at Marine Corps Recruit Depot San Diego, California, Dickey was transferred to the Marine Corps Base at Camp Pendleton, California, where he underwent individual combat training with the Second Infantry Training Regiment, graduating in August 1966.

The following October, Dickey joined Company B, 1st Battalion, 4th Marines, 3rd Marine Division, in the Republic of Vietnam. While attached to this unit, he participated in Operation Prairie. Dickey was promoted to private first class on October 1, 1966.

On November 8, 1966, Dickey was transferred to Company C, 1st Battalion, 4th Marines, 3rd Marine Division, and participated in combat against the Viet Cong, in Operations Deckhouse, Desoto and Beacon Hill. It was during the latter engagement that he was mortally wounded on March 26, 1967.

Dickey is buried in Brock Cemetery in Darke County, Ohio.

== Decorations ==
A list of his medals and decorations includes: the Medal of Honor, the Purple Heart with two Gold Stars, the National Defense Service Medal, the Vietnam Service Medal with one bronze star, and the Republic of Vietnam Campaign Medal.

	Medal of Honor		
Purple Heart with two gold stars	National Defense Service Medal	Vietnam Service Medal with one bronze star	Republic of Vietnam Campaign Medal

== Medal of Honor citation ==
The President of the United States in the name of The Congress takes pride in presenting the MEDAL OF HONOR posthumously to

PRIVATE FIRST CLASS DOUGLAS E. DICKEY
UNITED STATES MARINE CORPS

for service as set forth in the following CITATION:

For conspicuous gallantry and intrepidity at the risk of his life above and beyond the call of duty while serving with the Second Platoon, Company C, First Battalion, Fourth Marines, Third Marine Division in the Republic of Vietnam on March 26, 1967. While participating in Operation BEACON HILL I, the Second Platoon was engaged in a fierce battle with the Viet Cong at close range in dense jungle foliage. Private First Class Dickey had come forward to replace a radio operator who had been wounded in this intense action and was being treated by a medical corpsman. Suddenly an enemy grenade landed in the midst of a group of Marines, which included the wounded radio operator who was immobilized. Fully realizing the inevitable result of his actions, Private First Class Dickey, in a final valiant act, quickly and unhesitatingly threw himself upon the deadly grenade, absorbing with his own body the full and complete force of the explosion. Private First Class Dickey's personal heroism, extraordinary valor and selfless courage saved a number of his comrades from certain injury and possible death at the cost of his own life. His actions reflected great credit upon himself, the Marine Corps and the United States Naval Service. He gallantly gave his life for his country.

/S/ LYNDON B. JOHNSON

== Memorial ==
The portion of Ohio State Route 47 between SR 49 and US 127, near Ansonia in Darke County, is designated "Pfc. Douglas E. Dickey Memorial Highway" in his honor.

== See also ==
- List of Medal of Honor recipients
- List of Medal of Honor recipients for the Vietnam War

== Notes ==
Also: http://www.mwsadispatches.com/library/2021/a-final-valiant-act by LtCol John Lang USMC (ret)
