= Larry L. Maxam =

American marine (1948–1968)

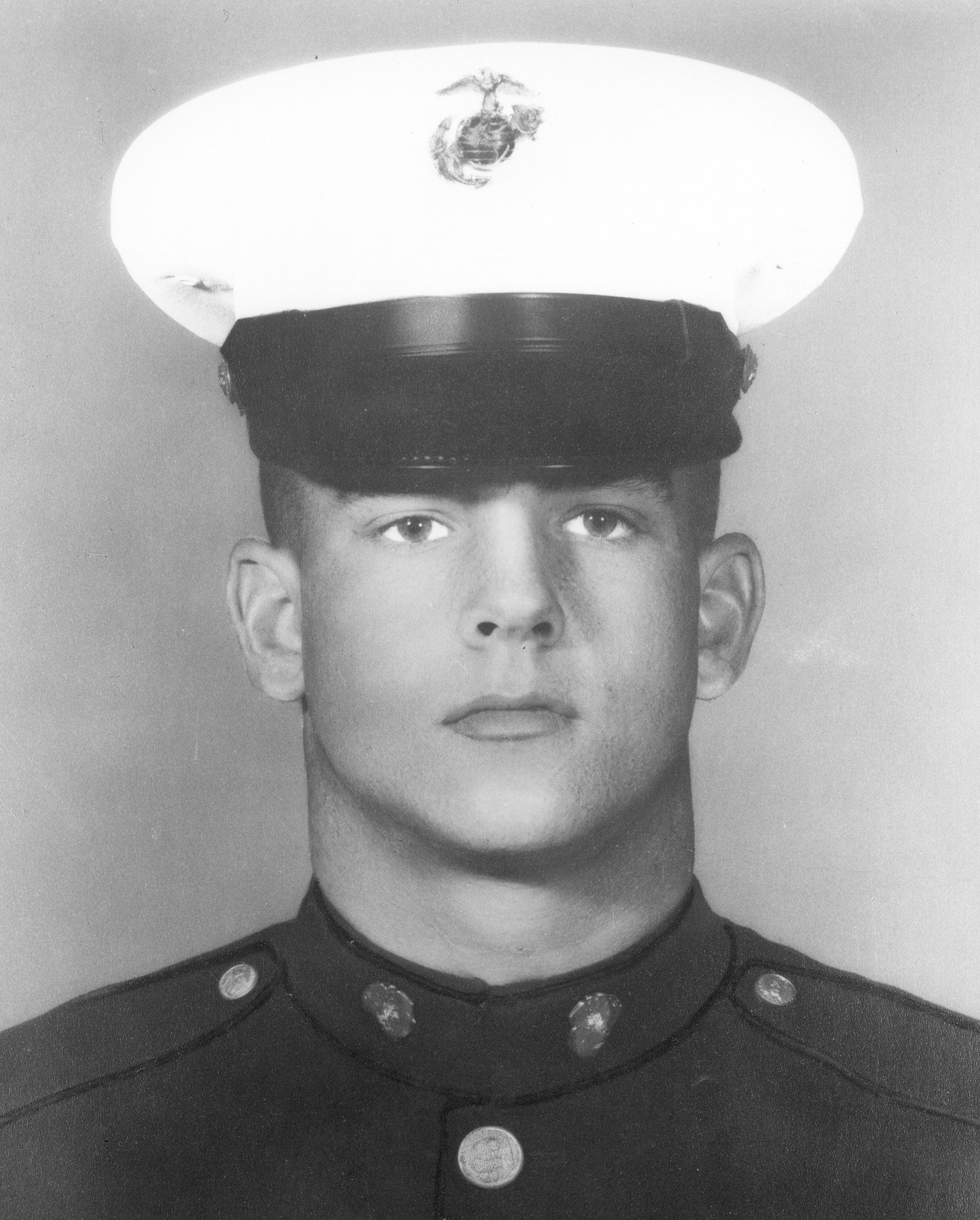
- Born: Larry Leonard Maxam; January 9, 1948; Glendale, California, U.S.
- Died: February 2, 1968 (aged 20); Cam Lo, Quảng Trị, South Vietnam
- Burial place: National Memorial Cemetery of the Pacific; Oahu, Hawaii, U.S.
- Military career
- Allegiance: United States of America
- Branch: United States Marine Corps
- Service years: 1965–1968
- Rank: Corporal
- Units: Company D, 1st Battalion 4th Marines, 3rd Marine Division
- Conflicts: Vietnam War; Operation Kentucky †
- Awards: Medal of Honor; Purple Heart; Presidential Unit Citation, Navy Presidential Unit Citation; National Defense Service Medal; Vietnam Service Medal w/ 2 service stars; Vietnam Military Merit Medal; Vietnam Gallantry Cross w/ palm; Vietnam Campaign Medal

Larry Leonard Maxam (January 9, 1948 – February 2, 1968) was a United States Marine who posthumously received the United States' highest military honor, the Medal of Honor, for heroism in the Vietnam War in February 1968.

== Biography ==
Larry Leonard Maxam was born on January 9, 1948, in Glendale, California. He attended Emerson Primary School, John Muir Junior High and Burbank High School, in Burbank, California, leaving the latter in 1964. Maxam was a member of the Church of Jesus Christ of Latter-day Saints.

He enlisted in the United States Marine Corps in Los Angeles on March 8, 1965. After completing recruit training with the 3rd Recruit Training Battalion at Marine Corps Recruit Depot San Diego in June 1965, he served briefly with the Casual Section of the 2nd Infantry Training Regiment at Marine Corps Base Camp Pendleton, California. He then completed individual combat training with Company A, at Camp Pendleton, in July 1965. From August 1965 until February 1966, he served with the Marine Aviation Detachment, Naval Air Technical Training Center Jacksonville.

Transferred to the 2nd Battalion 8th Marines, 2nd Marine Division, at Marine Corps Base Camp Lejeune, he served as a rifleman with Company H. In November 1966, he joined the rolls of Company E, but served on temporary additional duty as a fireman with Headquarters and Service Company, Officer Candidates School at Marine Corps Base Quantico, and as a rifleman attached to Camp Garcia, Force Troops, Vieques, Puerto Rico. He was promoted to private first class on April 1, 1966, and to Lance Corporal on January 1, 1967.

As a lance corporal, Maxam next served as a rifleman with Company F, Battalion Landing Team 2/8, in the Caribbean, until May 1967. In July 1967, he arrived in the Republic of Vietnam, and served as a rifleman, radioman, and squad leader with Company D, 1st Battalion 4th Marines, 3rd Marine Division. He was promoted to Corporal on October 1, 1967. While participating in Operation Kentucky on February 2, 1968, he was killed in action at Cam Lộ District Headquarters in Quảng Trị Province, Vietnam.

Maxam is buried in the National Memorial Cemetery of the Pacific, Oahu, Hawaii.

== Awards and honors ==
Maxam's medals and decorations include:

Medal of Honor	Purple Heart	Navy Presidential Unit Citation	National Defense Service Medal
Vietnam Service Medal w/ 2 service stars	Vietnam Military Merit Medal	Vietnam Gallantry Cross w/ palm	Vietnam Campaign Medal

The name Larry L. Maxam is inscribed on the Vietnam Veterans Memorial ("The Wall") on Panel 36E, Row 078.

=== Medal of Honor citation ===
The President of the United States in the name of The Congress takes pride in presenting the MEDAL OF HONOR posthumously to

CORPORAL LARRY L. MAXAM
UNITED STATES MARINE CORPS

for service as set forth in the following CITATION:

For conspicuous gallantry and intrepidity at the risk of his life above and beyond the call of duty while serving as a Fire Team Leader with Company D, First Battalion, Fourth Marines, Third Marine Division in the Republic of Vietnam. On 2 February 1968, the Cam Lo District Headquarters came under extremely heavy rocket, artillery, mortar, and recoilless rifle fire from a numerically superior enemy force, destroying a portion of the defensive perimeter. Corporal Maxam, observed the enemy massing for an assault into the compound across the remaining defensive wire, instructed his Assistant Fire Team Leader to take charge of the fire team, and unhesitatingly proceeded to the weakened section of the perimeter. Completely exposed to the concentrated enemy fire, he sustained multiple fragmentation wounds from exploding grenades as he ran to an abandoned machine gun and commenced to deliver effective fire on the advancing enemy. As the enemy directed maximum fire power against the determined Marine, Corporal Maxam's position received a direct hit from a rocket propelled grenade, knocking him backwards and inflicting severe fragmentation wounds to his face and right eye. Although momentarily stunned and in intense pain, Corporal Maxam courageously resumed his firing position and subsequently was struck again by small arms fire. With resolute determination, he gallantly continued to deliver intense machine gun fire, causing the enemy to retreat through the defensive wire to positions of cover. In a desperate attempt to silence his weapon, the North Vietnamese threw hand grenades and directed recoilless rifle fire against him inflicting two additional wounds. Too weak to reload his machine gun, Corporal Maxam fell to a prone position and valiantly continued to deliver effective fire with his rifle. After one and a half hours, during which he was hit repeatedly by fragments from exploding grenades and concentrated small arms fire, he succumbed to his wounds, having successfully defended nearly one half of the perimeter single-handedly. Corporal Maxam's aggressive fighting spirit, inspiring valor and selfless devotion to duty reflected great credit upon himself and the Marine Corps and upheld the highest traditions of the United States Naval Service. He gallantly gave his life for his country.

/S/ RICHARD M. NIXON

== Larry L. Maxam Memorial Park ==
Larry L. Maxam Memorial Park is a neighborhood park next to Valhalla Memorial Park Cemetery, in Burbank, California.

== See also ==
- List of Medal of Honor recipients
- List of Medal of Honor recipients for the Vietnam War
