= National Memorial Cemetery of the Pacific =

Veterans cemetery in Honolulu, Hawaii, United States

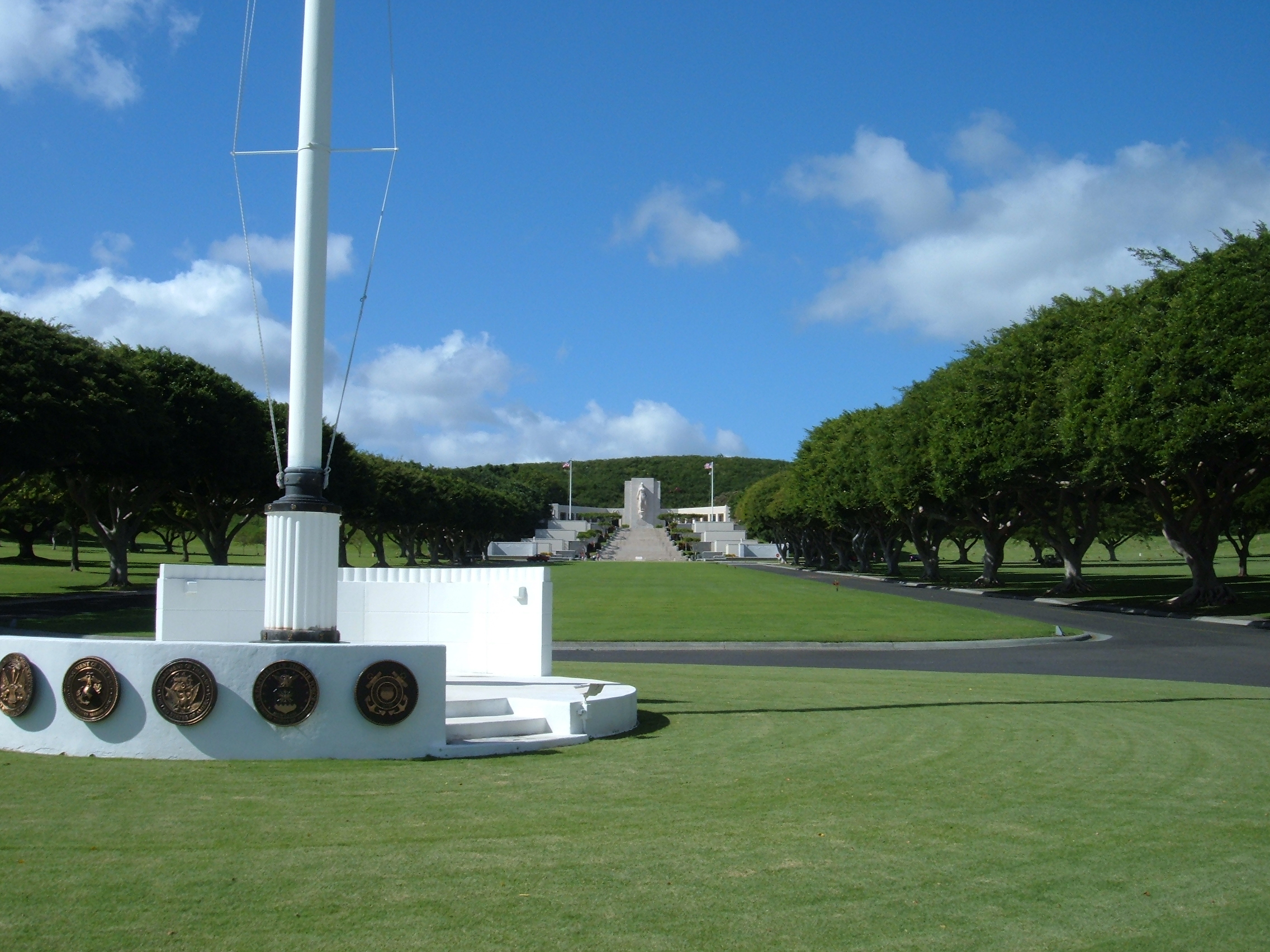
- National Memorial Cemetery of the Pacific
- Interactive map of National Memorial Cemetery of the Pacific

Details
- Established: 1949
- Location: Honolulu, Hawaii, U.S.
- Country: United States
- Coordinates: 21°18′46″N 157°50′47″W
- Type: United States National Cemetery
- Owned by: National Cemetery Administration
- No. of graves: >61,000
- Website: https://www.cem.va.gov/cems/nchp/nmcp.asp
- National Memorial Cemetery of the Pacific
- U.S. National Register of Historic Places
- U.S. Historic district
- NRHP reference No.: 76002276
- Added to NRHP: January 11, 1976

The National Memorial Cemetery of the Pacific (informally known as Punchbowl Cemetery) is a United States national cemetery located at Punchbowl Crater in Honolulu, Hawaii. It serves as a memorial to honor those men and women who served in the United States Armed Forces, and those who have been killed in doing so. It is administered by the National Cemetery Administration of the United States Department of Veterans Affairs and is listed on the National Register of Historic Places. Millions of visitors visit the cemetery each year, and it is one of the most popular tourist attractions in Hawaii.

== History ==
=== Establishment ===
The Hawaiian name of the Punchbowl Crater, Puowaina, is most commonly translated as "Hill of Sacrifice". The first known use was as a place where offenders of certain taboos (kapu) were offered as human sacrifices to ancient gods. Later, during the time of King Kamehameha, around 1800, two cannon were mounted at the rim of the crater and used for ceremonial purposes such as saluting distinguished arrivals.

During the late 1890s, a committee recommended that the crater become the site for a new cemetery to accommodate the growing population of Honolulu. The idea was rejected for fear of polluting the water supply and the emotional aversion to creating a city of the dead above a city of the living. Fifty years later, Congress authorized a small appropriation to establish a national cemetery in Honolulu with two provisions: that the location be acceptable to the War Department, and that the site would be donated rather than purchased. In 1943, the governor of Hawaii offered the Punchbowl for this purpose. The $50,000 appropriation proved insufficient, however, and the project was deferred until after World War II. By 1947, Congress and veteran organizations placed a great deal of pressure on the military to find a permanent burial site in Hawaii for the remains of thousands of World War II servicemen on the island of Guam awaiting permanent burial. Subsequently, the Army again began planning the Punchbowl cemetery.

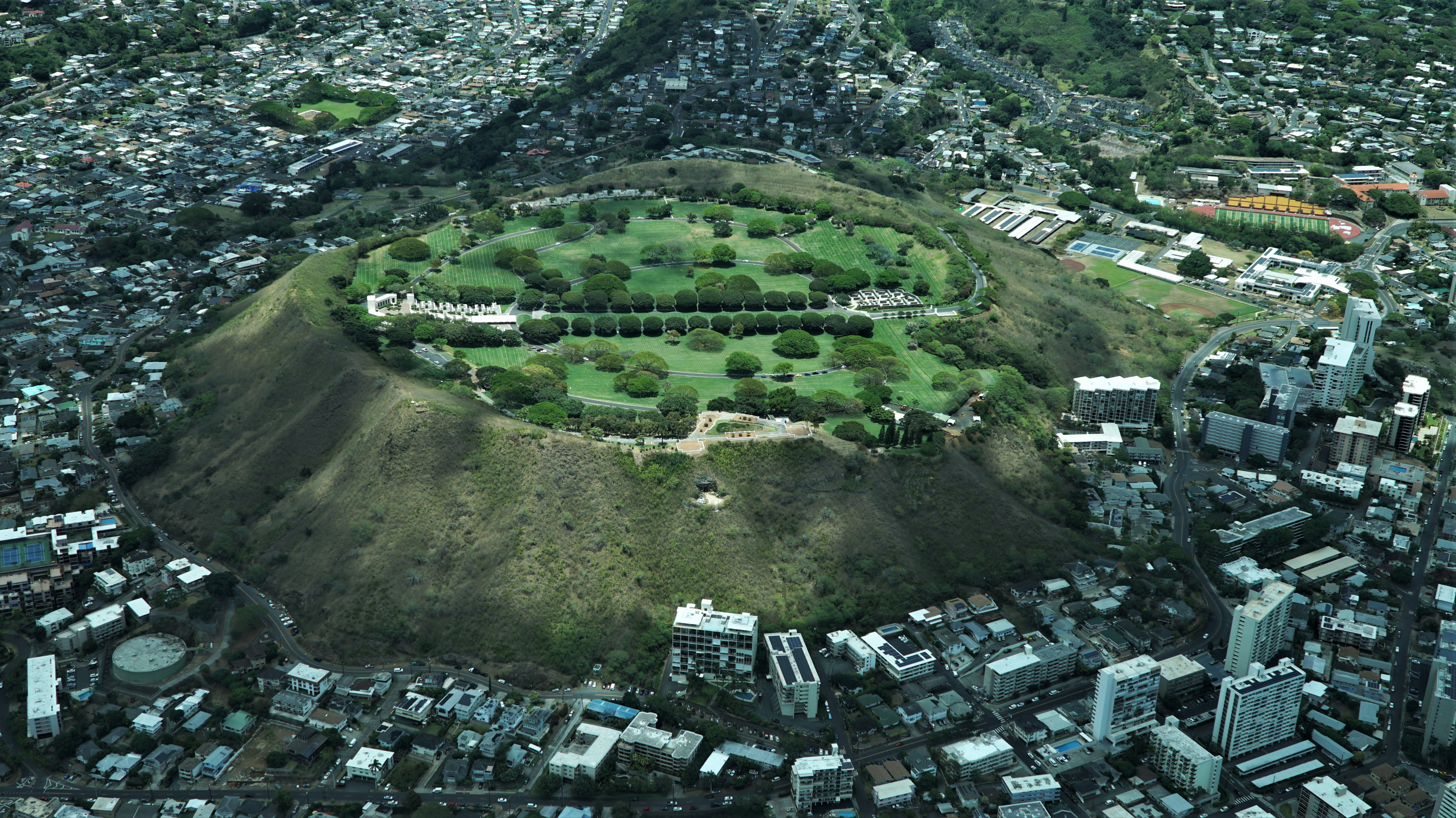
The National Memorial Cemetery of the Pacific occupies much of Punchbowl Crater.

In February 1948, Congress approved funding and construction began on the national cemetery.

Prior to the opening of the cemetery for the recently deceased, the remains of soldiers from locations around the Pacific Theater—including Guam, Wake Island, and Japanese POW camps—were transported to Hawaii for final interment. The first interment was made January 4, 1949. The cemetery opened to the public on July 19, 1949, with services for five war dead: an unknown serviceman; two Marines; an Army lieutenant; and one noted civilian war correspondent, Ernie Pyle. Initially, the graves at National Memorial Cemetery of the Pacific were marked with white wooden crosses and Stars of David—like the American cemeteries abroad—in preparation for the dedication ceremony on the fourth anniversary of V-J Day. Eventually, over 13,000 soldiers and sailors who died during World War II were laid to rest in the Punchbowl. Despite the Army's extensive efforts to inform the public that the star- and cross-shaped grave markers were only temporary, an outcry arose in 1951 when permanent flat granite markers replaced them.

=== Updates and improvements ===
A 25-bell carillon built by Schulmerich Carillons, Inc. was dedicated in 1956 during Veteran's Day services. The carillon is nicknamed "Coronation" and was funded in part by the Pacific War Memorial Commission and individual contributions. Arthur Godfrey helped to raise funds.

The National Memorial Cemetery of the Pacific was the first such cemetery to install Bicentennial Medal of Honor headstones, the medal insignia being defined in gold leaf. On May 11, 1976, 23 were placed on the graves of medal recipients, all but one of whom were killed in action.

In August 2001, about 70 generic "unknown" markers for the graves of men known to have died during the attack on Pearl Harbor were replaced with markers that included USS Arizona (BB-39) after it was determined they perished on this vessel. In addition, new information that identified grave locations of 175 men whose graves were previously marked as "unknown" resulted in the installation of new markers in October 2002.

In 2015, Congress allotted $25 million in funds for improvements, maintenance and expansion of the cemetery. The goal was to make the cemetery worth visiting for both tourists and local as well as highly advanced for the members and officers of the military.

The design-build project of this national cemetery consisted of many improvements both inside and outside including construction of the Memorial Wall, replacement of columbarium caps at courts 1–5 inside the cemetery, demolishing the existing Administration and PIC building, construction of Columbarium Court 13, which included 6,860 columbarium niches, repair of existing roadways, and replacement of existing signage, followed by site furnishing, landscaping, irrigation, and site utilities and achieving a LEED silver rating by the US Green Building Council. The project was awarded to Nan Inc by the Department of Veterans Affairs for $25,100,445.

The cemetery is currently undergoing a major construction project to build additional columbarium space.

=== Management and recognition ===
The National Park Service has managed national cemeteries since 1972 and all were transferred from the Department of War to the Department of the Interior by Executive Order 6228 of July 28, 1933. On January 11, 1976, the cemetery was designated a historic district on the National Register of Historic Places.

== Burials and interments ==
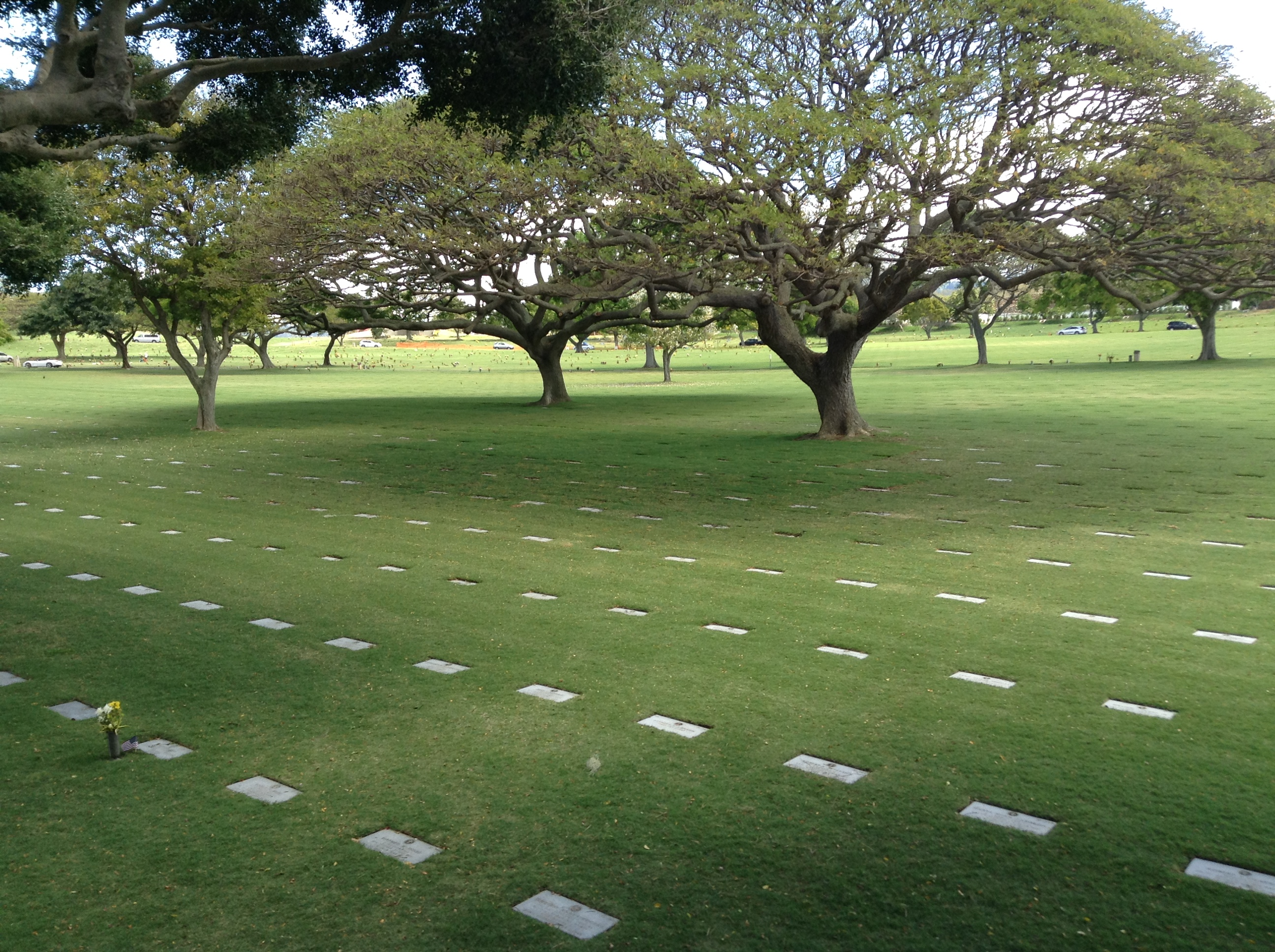
As of 1951, all the graves are marked with flat granite headstones.

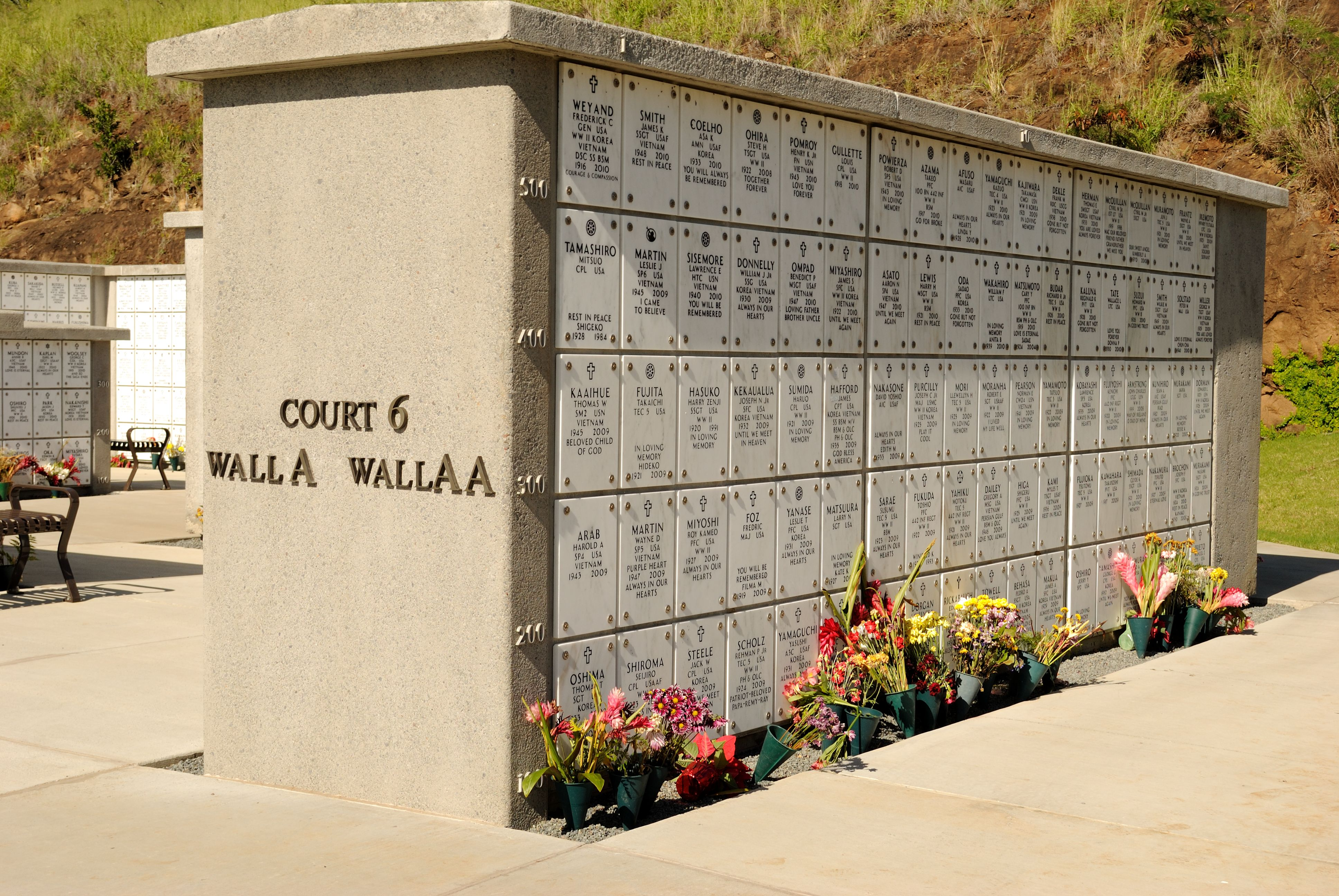
One of the columbaria at the cemetery

Since the cemetery was dedicated on September 2, 1949, approximately 53,000 World War II, Korean War, and Vietnam War veterans and their dependents have been interred. The cemetery now almost exclusively accepts cremated remains for above-ground placement in columbaria; casketed and cremated remains of eligible family members of those already interred there may, however, be considered for burial.

=== Operation Glory ===
After their retreat in 1950, dead servicemembers were buried at a temporary military cemetery near Hungnam, North Korea. During Operation Glory, which occurred from July to November 1954, the dead of each side were exchanged; remains of 4,167 U.S. soldiers were exchanged for 13,528 North Korean or Chinese dead. In addition, 546 civilians who died in United Nations prisoner of war camps were turned over to the South Korean government. After "Operation Glory" 416 Korean War "unknowns" were buried in the Punchbowl Cemetery. According to one report, 1,394 names were also transmitted during Operation Glory from the Chinese and North Koreans (of which 858 names proved to be correct); of the 4,167 returned remains were found to be 4,219 individuals, of whom 2,944 were found to be Americans; all but 416 were identified by name. Of the 239 Korean War dead unaccounted for, 186 were not associated with Punchbowl unknowns (176 were identified, and of the remaining 10 cases, four were non-Americans of Asiatic descent; one was British; three were identified, and two cases unconfirmed).

From 1990 to 1994, North Korea excavated and turned over 208 sets of remains—possibly containing remains of 200–400 US servicemen—but few identifiable because of co-mingling of remains. In 2011 remains were identified.

From 1996 to 2006, 220 remains were recovered near the Chinese border. In 2008, a total of 63 were identified (26 World War II; 19 Korea; 18 Vietnam) (Among those identified: January 2008 remains of a Michigan soldier. In March 2008, remains of an Indiana soldier and an Ohio soldier were identified). According to a report June 24, 2008, of 10 Korean War remains disinterred from the Punchbowl six have been identified. From January to April 2009, a total of twelve Unknowns have been identified—three from World War II; eight from Korean War; one from Vietnam. In 2011 remains returned in 2000 were identified.

In 2007, remains of two of the Punchbowl unknowns were identified—both from the 1st Marine Division. One was Pfc. Donald Morris Walker of Support Company/1st Service Battalion/1st Marine Division who was KIA December 7, 1950 and the other was Pfc. Carl West of Weapons Company/1st Battalion/7th Regiment/1st Marine Division who was KIA December 10, 1950.

In 2011, remains of an unknown USAF pilot from Operation Glory were identified from the Punchbowl Cemetery; POW remains from Operation Glory were also identified in 2011.

== Honolulu Memorial ==
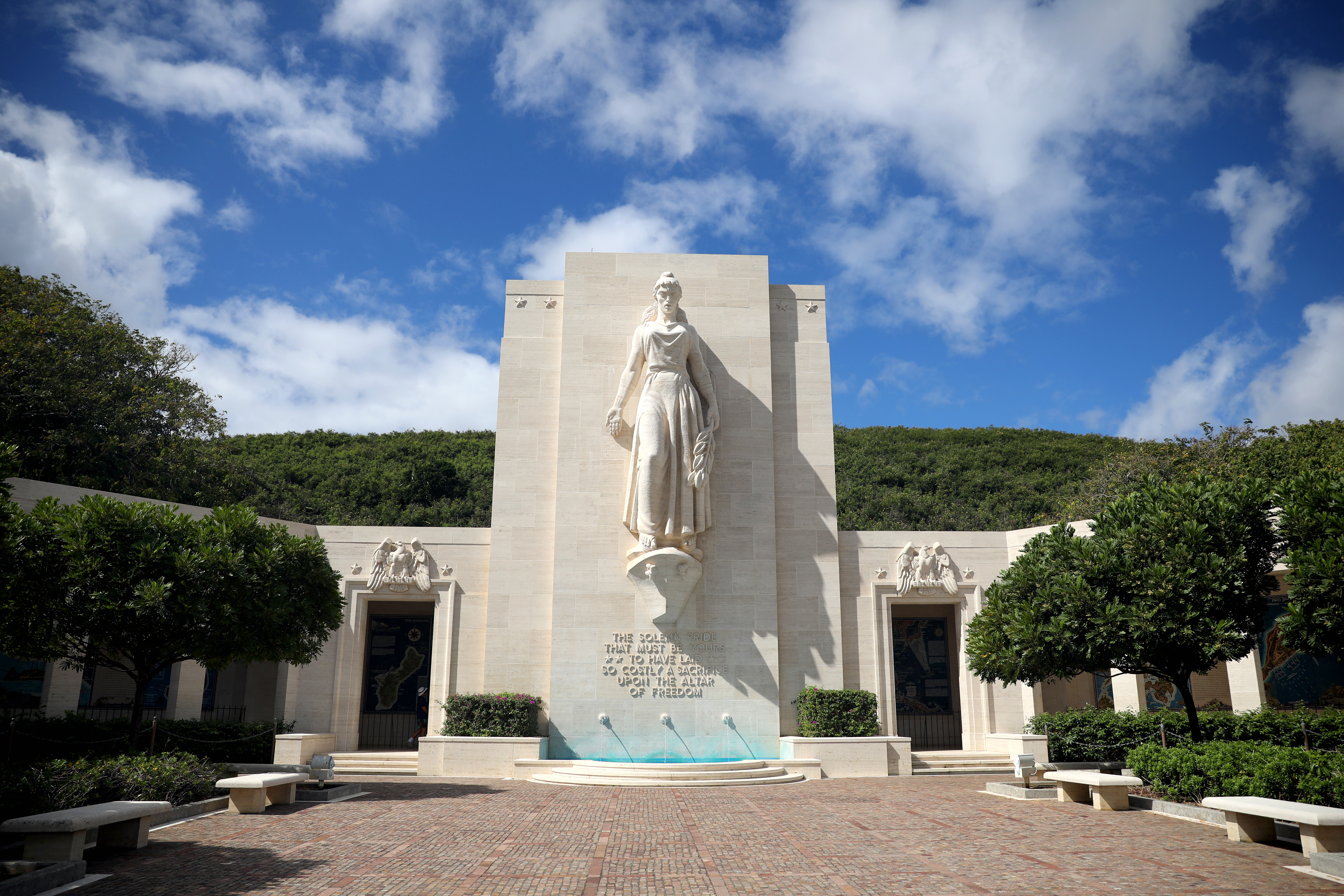
The walls of the Honolulu Memorial are etched with names of those who were never recovered from battle.

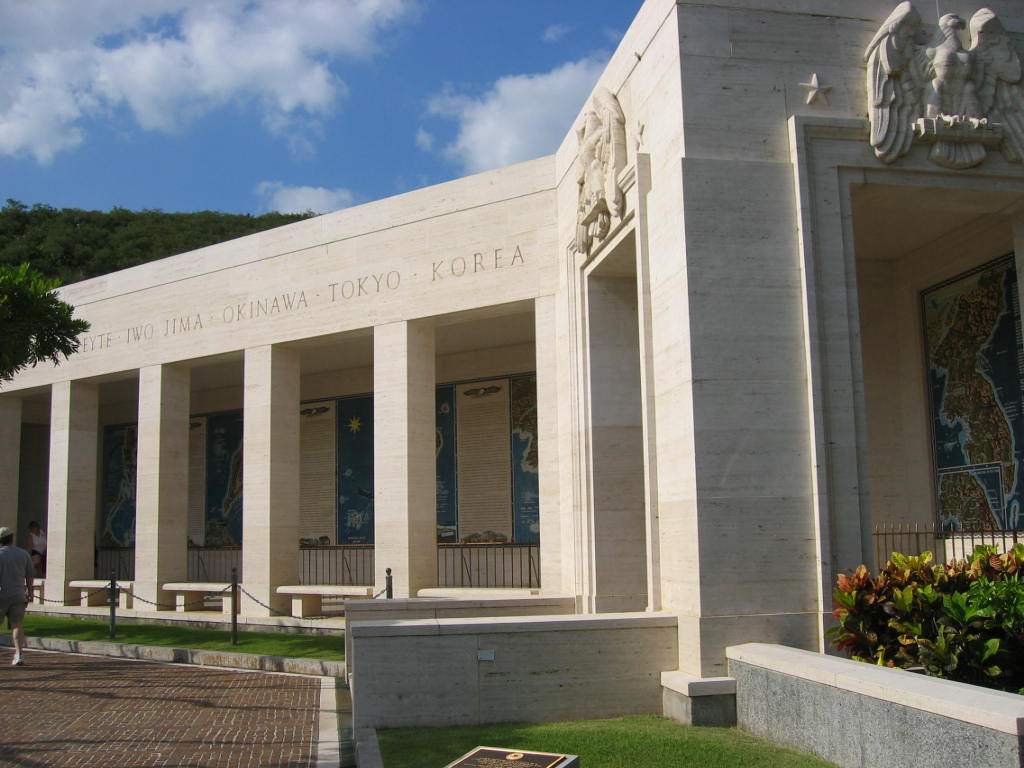
The Honolulu Memorial contains a small chapel and tribute to the various battles fought in the Pacific.

In 1964, the American Battle Monuments Commission (ABMC) erected the Honolulu Memorial at the National Memorial Cemetery "to honor the sacrifices and achievements of American Armed Forces in the Pacific during World War II and in the Korean War". The memorial was later expanded in 1980 to include the Vietnam War. The names of 28,788 military personnel who are missing in action or were lost or buried at sea in the Pacific during these conflicts are listed on marble slabs in ten Courts of the Missing which flank the Memorial's grand stone staircase.

The Honolulu Memorial is one of three war memorials in the United States administered by the ABMC; the others are the East Coast Memorial to the Missing of World War II in New York and the West Coast Memorial to the Missing of World War II in San Francisco.

The dedication stone at the base of the staircase is engraved with the following words:

IN THESE GARDENS ARE RECORDED
THE NAMES OF AMERICANS
WHO GAVE THEIR LIVES
IN THE SERVICE OF THEIR COUNTRY
AND WHOSE EARTHLY RESTING PLACE
IS KNOWN ONLY TO GOD

At the top of the staircase in the Court of Honor is a statue of Lady Columbia, also known as Lady Liberty. Here she is reported to represent all grieving mothers. She stands on the bow of a ship holding a laurel branch. The inscription below the statue, taken from Abraham Lincoln's letter to Mrs. Bixby, reads:

THE SOLEMN PRIDE
THAT MUST BE YOURS
TO HAVE LAID
SO COSTLY A SACRIFICE
UPON THE ALTAR
OF FREEDOM

== Other memorials ==
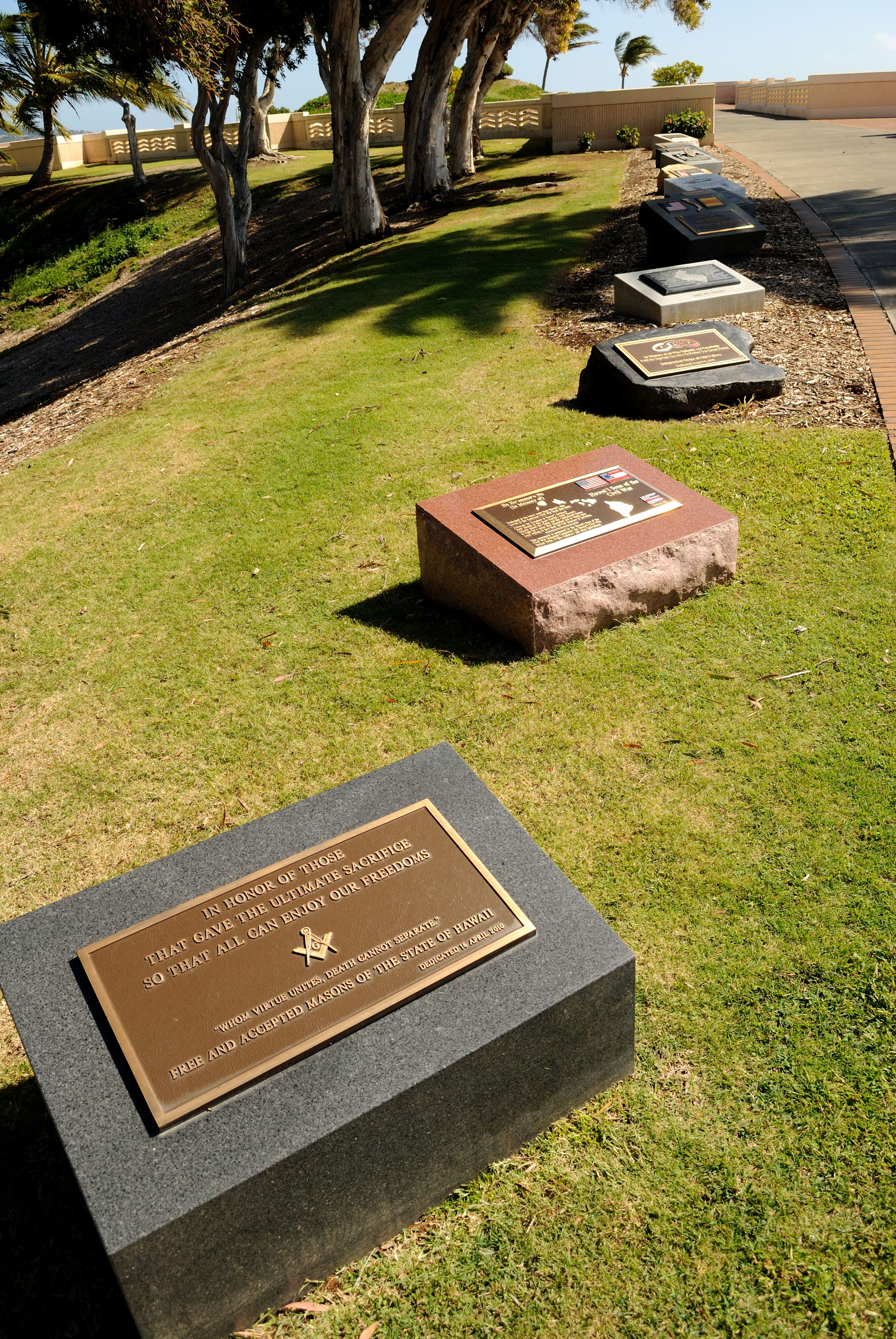
Plaques on the Memorial Pathway

The National Memorial Cemetery of the Pacific contains a Memorial Pathway that is lined with a variety of memorial markers from various organizations and governments that honor America's veterans. As of 2012, there were 60 memorial boulders bearing bronze plaques along the pathway. Additional memorials can be found throughout the National Memorial Cemetery of the Pacific, most commemorating soldiers of 20th-century wars, including those killed at Pearl Harbor.

== Notable interments and memorials ==
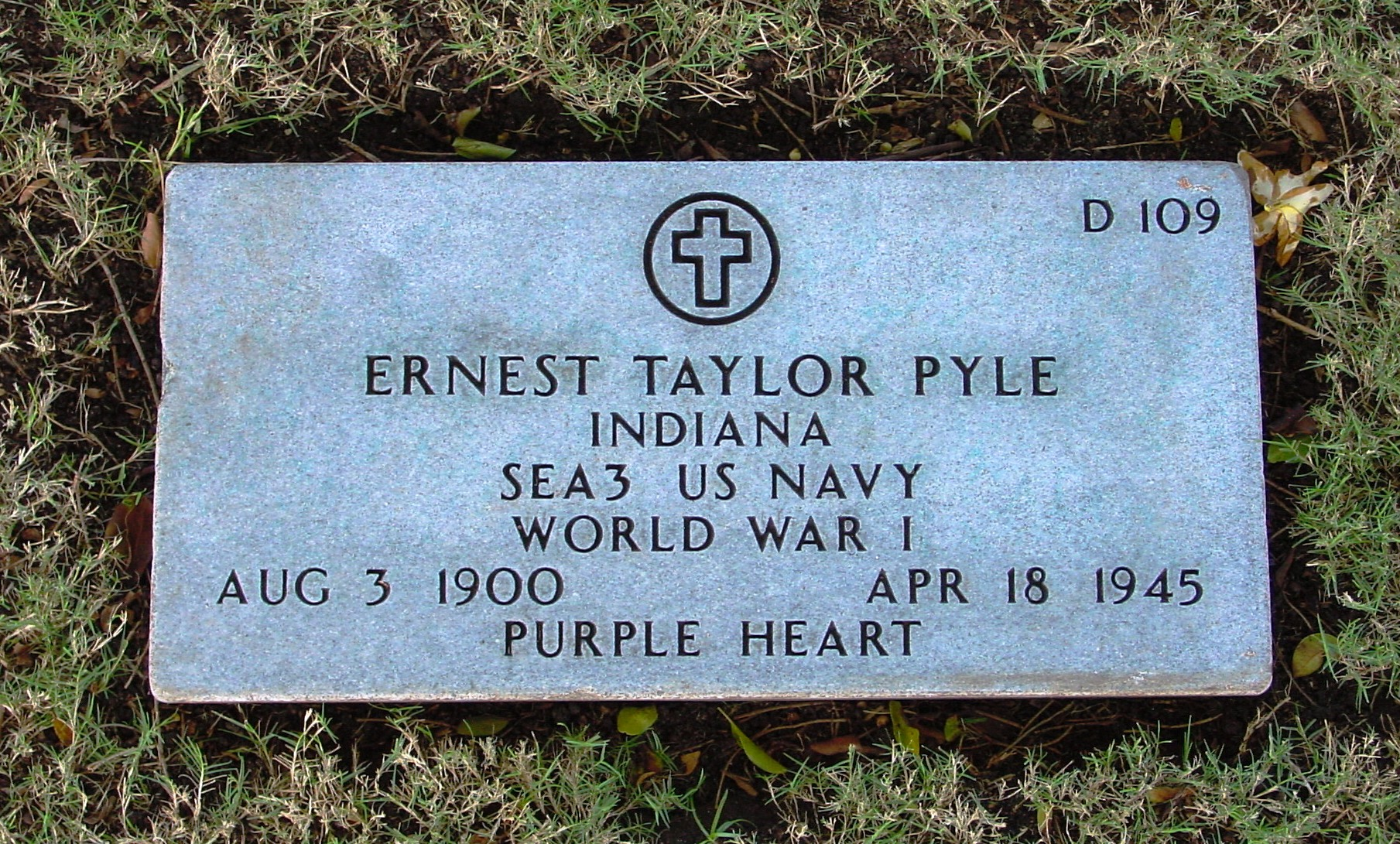
Gravestone of Ernie Pyle

- Medal of Honor recipients
  - William R. Caddy (1925–1945), World War II †
  - George H. Cannon (1915–1941), World War II †
  - Anthony P. Damato (1922–1944), World War II †
  - William G. Fournier (1913–1943), World War II †
  - Kenneth N. Good (1930–1963), Vietnam War †
  - Barney F. Hajiro (1916–2011), World War II
  - William D. Halyburton Jr. (1924–1945), World War II †
  - Mikio Hasemoto (1916–1943), World War II †
  - Louis J. Hauge Jr. (1924–1945), World War II †
  - William D. Hawkins (1914–1943), World War II †
  - Shizuya Hayashi (1917–2008), World War II
  - Edwin J. Hill (1894–1941), World War II †
  - Daniel Inouye (1924–2012), World War II, Hawaii's first congressman (1959–63) and US Senator (1963–2012)
  - Yeiki Kobashigawa (1917–2005), World War II
  - Robert T. Kuroda (1922–1944), World War II †
  - Larry L. Maxam (1948–1968), Vietnam War †
  - Martin O. May (1922–1945), World War II †
  - Robert H. McCard (1918–1944), World War II †
  - Leroy A. Mendonca (1932–1951), Korean War †
  - Kaoru Moto (1917–1992), World War II
  - Joseph E. Muller (1908–1945), World War II †
  - Masato Nakae (1917–1998), World War II
  - Shinyei Nakamine (1920–1944), World War II †
  - Allan M. Ohata (1918–1977), World War II
  - Joseph W. Ozbourn (1919–1944), World War II †
  - Herbert K. Pililaau (1928–1951), Korean War †
  - Thomas James Reeves (1895–1941), World War II †
  - Joseph Sarnoski (1915–1943), World War II †
  - Elmelindo Rodrigues Smith (1935–1967), Vietnam War †
  - Grant F. Timmerman (1919–1944), World War II †
  - Francis B. Wai (1917–1944), World War II †
  - Benjamin F. Wilson (1921–1988), Korean War
  - Rodney J. T. Yano (1943–1969), Vietnam War †
- Other notables
  - Darr H. Alkire (1903–1977), Air Force brigadier general, senior officer in command of the West Compound at Stalag Luft III prisoner of war camp
  - Wally Amos (1936–2024), businessman and author, founder of Famous Amos chocolate chip cookies
  - Donn Beach (1907–1989), born Ernest Raymond Beaumont Gantt, founder of Don the Beachcomber restaurants and inventor of the tiki bar
  - John A. Burns (1909–1975), second state governor of Hawaii (1962–74)
  - John "Jack" Chevigny (1906–1945), Notre Dame football player (said, "that's one for the Gipper" in 1928 game) who was killed on Iwo Jima †
  - Ralph Waldo Christie (1893–1987), Navy admiral involved with torpedo and submarine operations before and during World War II
  - Norman "Sailor Jerry" Collins (1911–1973), prominent Honolulu tattoo artist
  - Stanley Armour Dunham (1918–1992), grandfather of United States President Barack Obama
  - Frank F. Fasi (1920–2010), six-term mayor of the City and County of Honolulu
  - Henry Oliver "Hank" Hansen (1919–1945), original Iwo Jima flag raiser †
  - Jasper Holmes (1900–1986), US Naval Intelligence analyst
  - John J. Hyland (1912–1998), admiral and commander of the Pacific Fleet during Vietnam
  - Douglas Kennedy (1915–1973), actor; major in the Signal Corps with the Office of Strategic Services and Army Intelligence during World War II
  - Young-Oak Kim (1919–2005), member of the 442nd Regimental Combat Team and first Asian-American to command a battalion in wartime
  - Wah Kau Kong (1919–1944), first Chinese-American fighter pilot †
  - Spark Matsunaga (1916–1990), US Senator from Hawaii, member of the 442nd Regimental Combat Team
  - Patsy Mink (1927–2002), US Congresswoman from Hawaii and co-author of Title IX
  - Ellison Onizuka (1946–1986), first astronaut from Hawaii, killed in the space shuttle Challenger disaster
  - Ernie Pyle (1900–1945), World War I veteran and Pulitzer Prize-winning World War II war correspondent †
  - William F. Quinn (1919–2006), territorial governor (1957–59) and first state governor of Hawaii (1959–62)
  - Thomas Rienzi (1919–2010), Army Signal Corps lieutenant general and communications-electronics innovator
  - Kent Rogers (1923–1944), actor and impressionist †
  - Harold Sakata (1920–1982), professional wrestler and actor
  - George P. Seneff Jr. (1916–1998), Army lieutenant general
  - Leo Sharp (1924–2016), World War II veteran, horticulturist, and drug courier
  - James Shigeta (1929–2014), actor
  - Charles L. Veach (1944–1995), USAF fighter pilot and NASA astronaut

== In popular culture ==
The statue of Lady Columbia is featured in the opening sequence of both the 1970s television series Hawaii Five-O and its 2010 remake. The latter series has also filmed at the cemetery several times—John McGarrett, the father of lead character Steve McGarrett, is a Vietnam War veteran and is buried there.

== See also ==
- Other United States Navy memorials
- Recovery of US human remains from the Korean War
- Nimitz Bowl - 1944-1949 at site
