= USS Hill =

United States Navy destroyer escort during World War II

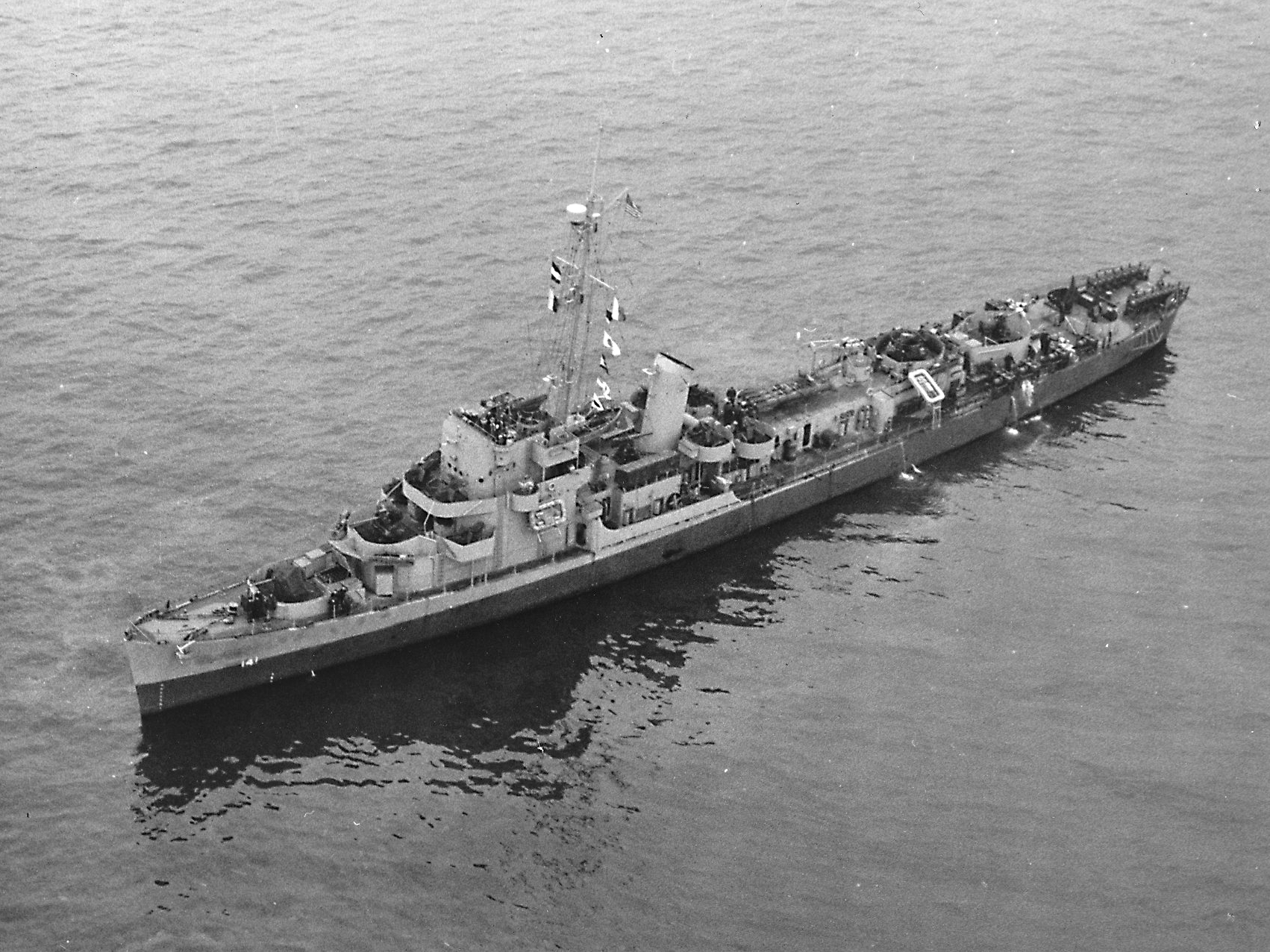

History

United States
- Namesake: Edwin J. Hill
- Builder: Consolidated Steel Corporation, Orange, Texas
- Laid down: 21 December 1942
- Launched: 28 February 1943
- Commissioned: 16 August 1943
- Decommissioned: 7 June 1946
- Stricken: 1 October 1972
- Fate: Sold 18 January 1974, scrapped

General characteristics
- Class & type: Edsall-class destroyer escort
- Displacement: 1,253 tons standard; 1,590 tons full load
- Length: 306 feet (93.27 m)
- Beam: 36.58 feet (11.15 m)
- Draft: 10.42 full load feet (3.18 m)
- Propulsion: 4 FM diesel engines, 4 diesel-generators, 6,000 shp (4.5 MW), 2 screws
- Speed: 21 knots (39 km/h)
- Range: 9,100 nmi. at 12 knots; (17,000 km at 22 km/h)
- Complement: 8 officers, 201 enlisted
- Armament: 3 × single 3 in (76 mm)/50 guns; 1 × twin 40 mm AA guns; 8 × single 20 mm AA guns; 1 × triple 21 in (533 mm) torpedo tubes; 8 × depth charge projectors; 1 × depth charge projector (hedgehog); 2 × depth charge tracks

USS Hill (DE-141) was an Edsall-class destroyer escort in service with the United States Navy from 1943 to 1946. She was scrapped in 1974.

== History ==
Hill was named after Edwin J. Hill, Chief Boatswain who died in action during the Japanese attack on Pearl Harbor, for which he was posthumously awarded the Navy Medal of Honor. She was launched 28 February 1943 by the Consolidated Steel Corp., Orange, Texas, sponsored by Mrs. Edward Hill, widow of Chief Boatswain Hill; and commissioned there 16 August 1943.

=== Battle of the Atlantic ===
After shakedown out of Bermuda, Hill tested new torpedo explosives and engaged in training along the New England coast. Departing Hampton Roads 5 December, Hill escorted a convoy to Casablanca via Ponta del Gada, Azores, and returned to the States 18 January 1944. During the next year the destroyer escort made four more transatlantic voyages to the North African coast as Allied forces pushed up the Italian peninsula and began their assault on southern France. On her fourth voyage, Hill performed antisubmarine patrol at Bahia, Brazil, and Cape Town, South Africa.

=== Pacific War ===
Following operations in the Caribbean February–March 1945, Hill proceeded to Argentia, Newfoundland, 3 April to serve as convoy screen and plane guard for escort carrier USS Mission Bay (CVE-59). After repairs at New York she participated in training exercises until sailing for the Caribbean 2 July. Two weeks later Hill sailed for the Pacific via the Panama Canal Zone. En route to Hawaii, Hill received word of Japanese capitulation and, after putting in at Pearl Harbor sailed for home again.

=== Decommissioning and fate ===
Hill reached Green Cove Springs, Florida, via San Pedro, Los Angeles, the Panama Canal, and Charleston, South Carolina, 27 October 1945. She decommissioned and was placed in reserve there 7 June 1946. She was struck from the Navy list on 1 October 1972 and sold 18 January 1974 and scrapped.
