= Operation Desoto =

1967 US Marine Corps operation in Vietnam

- Part of the Vietnam War
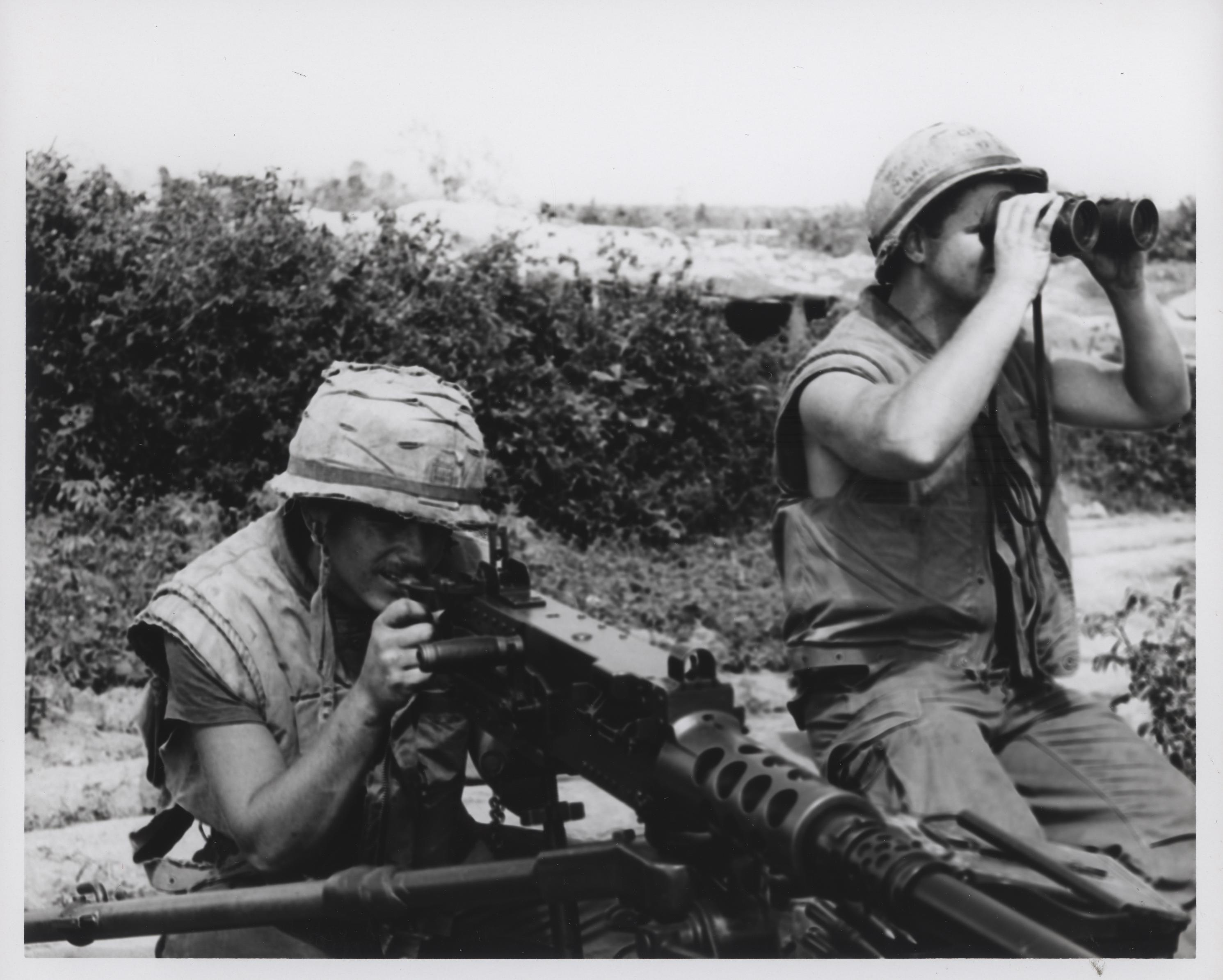
- 3/7 Marines sniper team
Date	27 January – 7 April 1967
Location	Đức Phổ District, South Vietnam 14.815°N 108.96°E
Result	See aftermath

Belligerents
United States	Viet Cong

Commanders and leaders
Herman Nickerson Jr.	

Units involved
3rd Battalion, 7th Marines; 12th Marines	38th Battalion; 95th Battalion

Casualties and losses
76 killed	US body count: 383 killed

Operation Desoto was a US Marine Corps operation that took place in Đức Phổ District, lasting from 27 January to 7 April 1967.

== Background ==
As part of the US-Vietnamese combined action plan for 1967, the 3rd Battalion, 7th Marines was scheduled to assume the defense of Đức Phổ District from the Army of the Republic of Vietnam (ARVN) 4th Battalion, 4th Regiment 2nd Division which would concentrate on pacification.

== Operation ==
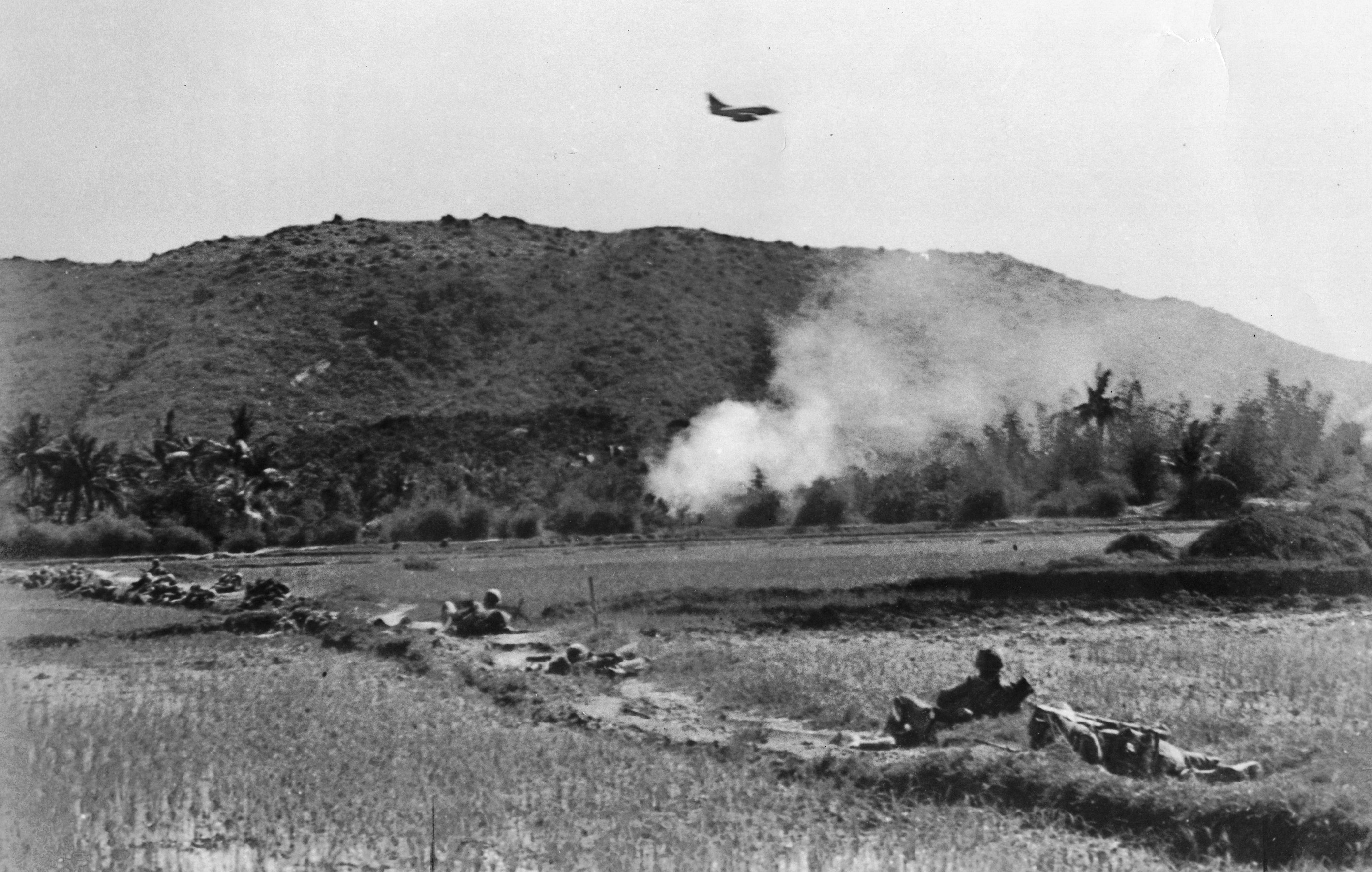
An A-4 Skyhawk making a bombing run on a Viet Cong position

On 27 January, Company L 3/7 Marines and Battery I, 12th Marines were deployed by helicopter to Núi Đàng. The following morning, Companies I and M 3/7 Marines were landed by helicopter north of Núi Đàng and moved west and east to secure the adjacent villages of Vinh Binh (1) and Truong Sanh (14.818°N 108.975°E).

On occupying Truong Sanh, villagers informed the Marines that a large Vietcong (VC) force had abandoned the village and moved north to Tan Tu (2)(14.823°N 108.973°E). As Company M advanced on Tan Tu (2), they were hit first by sniper fire and the automatic weapons fire from entrenched VC in the village. The Marines withdrew, called in artillery and airstrikes, and attacked again, but were again driven back by heavy fire and so withdrew to a night defensive position. On the morning of 29 January, Companies I and M assaulted Tan Tu (2). Despite suffering casualties from long-range sniper fire, the village was barely defended and the Marines secured it by 13:30.

On 30 January, after preparatory artillery fire, Company I moved east towards the village of Hai Mon (14.823°N 108.978°E) where they were met with intense small arms fire. Airstrikes were called in, followed by helicopter gunships. One of the UH-1E gunships was hit and had to make an emergency landing. The VC defenses were well-constructed and the Marines soon found themselves caught in a crossfire in the paddyfields west of the village. At 16:55, Company I was ordered to withdraw to the west and Company M was sent in to help them disengage under the cover of artillery and airstrikes. Due to the intense fire, the withdrawal and evacuation of casualties wasn't completed until 22:00.

On 31 January, a massive artillery bombardment was directed against Hai Mon. That night, the 3/7 command post was hit by VC mortar fire then attacked by an estimated 20 VC. The attack was defeated with two VC killed and 14 Marines wounded.

On 5 February, the Marines launched a fresh assault against Hai Mon. Reconnaissance had indicated that the VC defenses faced west and so it was decided that Companies L and M would be deployed by helicopter east of the village. As artillery hit Hai Mon, helicopters from HMM-262 deployed the Marines, who were quickly able to overcome the defenses with supporting fire. A VC force was observed escaping north by sampan across the Song Tra Cau and airstrikes were directed against them. On searching Hai Mon, the Marines found a network of well-constructed tunnels and bunkers, and engineers used over 3600 lbs of explosives to destroy them.

Operation Desoto continued throughout February with the Marines searching numerous villages, meeting minimal opposition but suffering steady attrition due to mines and sniper fire.

On 16 February, 1st Battalion 4th Marines launched Operation Deckhouse VI at Sa Huỳnh 18 km southeast of Núi Đàng. After securing the area and establishing a supply base, 1/4 Marines were to move north to support 3/7 Marines and conduct search and destroy operations in the Đức Phổ/Mộ Đức Districts. 1/4 Marines uncovered numerous VC stores and bunkers and suffered six killed and 61 wounded while the VC lost 201 killed before arriving at positions near Nui Dau (14.754°N 109.00°E) on 25 February. Deckhouse VI continued until 3 March.

Operation Desoto continued into March with numerous small skirmishes with the VC. On the early morning of 24 March, the VC hit the 3/7 Marines base with mortar and recoilless rifle fire, killing three Marines and igniting a 70,000-gallon fuel storage dump. On 27 March, the VC fired 18 recoilless rifle rounds at the destroyer USS Ozbourn 1 km (0.62 mi) from the mouth of the Song Tra Cau causing no damage to the ship. Also on 27 March, Company K 3/7 Marines conducted a search operation near Nui Dau and VC were observed to be escaping the area and hiding in a nearby swamp; helicopter gunships attacked the swamp, killing 23 VC, while another 49 were captured.

On 5 April, a patrol from Company G 3/7 Marines triggered a mine near their night defensive position southeast of Nui Dau. A medical evacuation of the two wounded Marines was requested, and a UH-1E gunship #151852 from VMO-6 arrived to pick up the wounded; the helicopter was instructed to hover over the landing zone in case there were any more mines, but as it did so, a command-detonated mine made from a 250 lb bomb was detonated, destroying the helicopter, and a further mine was detonated as Marines rushed to assist, killing all four helicopter crew and eight Marines and Navy corpsmen.

== Aftermath ==
Operation Desoto concluded on 7 April, the Marines had suffered 76 dead and 573 wounded and claimed the Vietcong 383 killed.
