= Richard E. Bush =

United States Marine Corporal

Richard Earl Bush
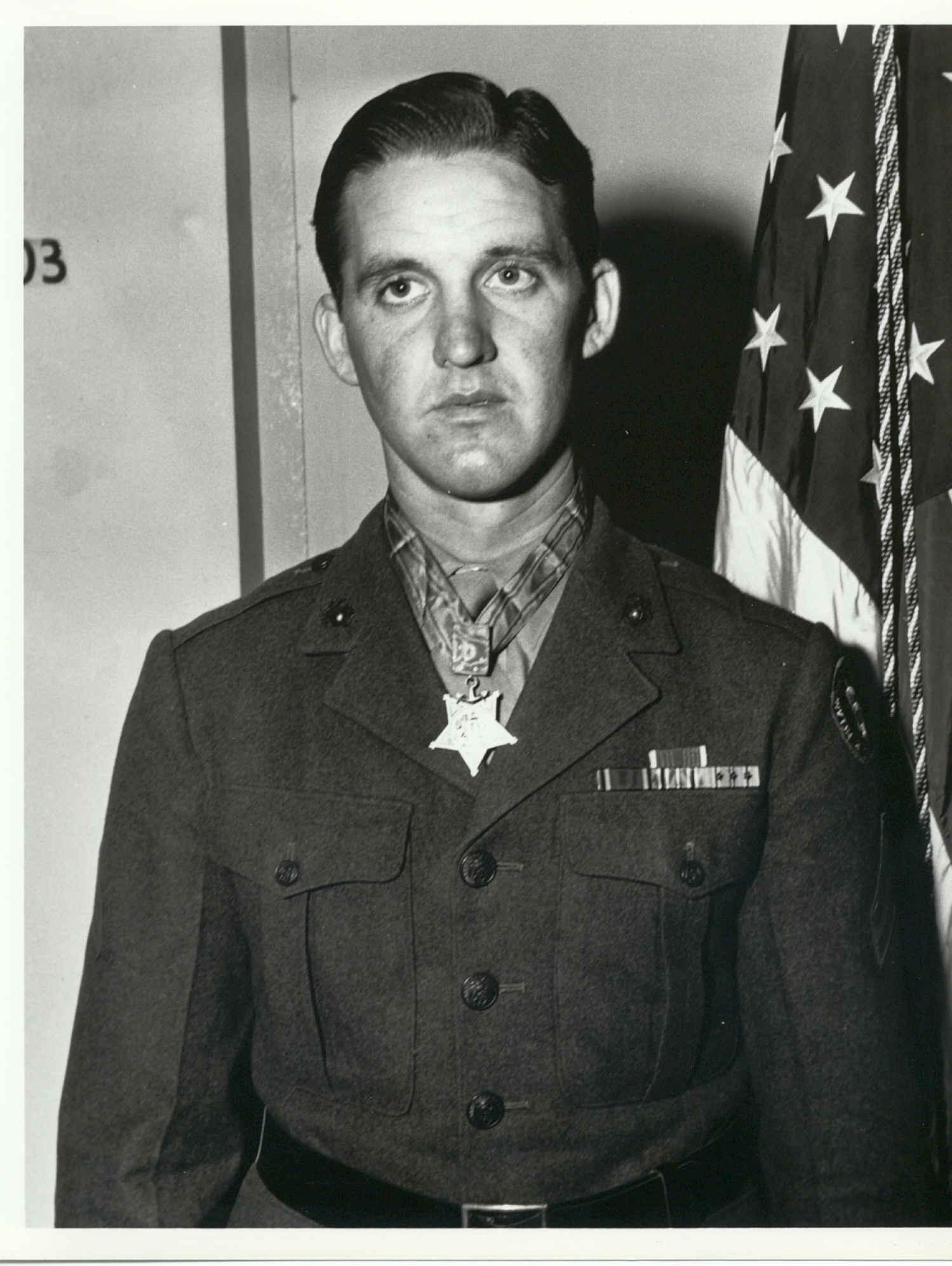
- Richard E. Bush, Medal of Honor recipient
- Born: December 23, 1924; Glasgow, Kentucky, U.S.
- Died: June 7, 2004 (aged 79); Waukegan, Illinois, U.S.
- Burial place: Ascension Catholic Cemetery Libertyville, Illinois; 42.30741°N 87.91936°W
- Military career
- Allegiance: United States of America
- Branch: United States Marine Corps
- Service years: 1942–1945
- Rank: Master gunnery sergeant
- Units: 1st Raider Battalion; 1st Battalion 4th Marines
- Conflicts: World War II: Battle of Okinawa
- Awards: Medal of Honor; Purple Heart Medal (2); Combat Action Ribbon; Presidential Unit Citation

Richard Earl Bush (December 23, 1924 – June 7, 2004) was a United States Marine corporal who received the Medal of Honor for heroism on Okinawa during World War II. On April 16, 1945, Cpl. Bush placed himself on a thrown enemy grenade, absorbing the force of the explosion, saving the lives of his fellow Marines and corpsmen. In World War II, twenty-seven Marines similarly used their bodies against thrown enemy grenades in order to save their comrades' lives. Four of these Marines survived and were awarded the Medal of Honor — Richard Bush, Jacklyn H. Lucas, Carlton R. Rouh, and Richard K. Sorenson.

== Early life ==
Bush was born in Glasgow, Kentucky, on December 23, 1924. He worked for his father as a tractor driver on a tobacco farm and completed one year of high school.

== World War II ==
U.S. Marine Corps

He enlisted in the United States Marine Corps Reserve on September 22, 1942, in Bowling Green, Kentucky. He received his basic training at Marine Corps Recruit Depot San Diego, California, and later was transferred to a replacement battalion at Camp Elliott, California, for further training as an armorer.

Marine Raiders

He served with the Marine Corps Raiders in the Pacific. While with the "Raiders" he was promoted to corporal.

Okinawa

On April 16, 1945, Corporal Bush, was serving in the 1st Battalion, 4th Marine Regiment, 6th Marine Division as a rifle company squad leader when he led his men in a charge against an enemy stronghold during the final assault against Mount Yaetake in northern Okinawa. During that action, he was seriously wounded and evacuated to a nearby medical aid area for treatment. While at this position, an enemy grenade was hurled among the navy corpsmen and wounded Marines including himself. He immediately took and placed the grenade under himself saving his comrades lives. He survived the blast with severe wounds, losing several fingers and the sight in one eye.

== Post war ==
Medal of Honor

On October 4, 1945, President Harry S. Truman, in a White House ceremony, presented Cpl. Bush with the Medal of Honor for "conspicuous gallantry and intrepidity at the risk of his life above and beyond the call of duty." He was also awarded a second Purple Heart Medal (gold 5/16 inch star) for wounds received on Okinawa.

Veterans counselor

In the years following the war, Bush worked for the Veterans Administration until 1972 as a counselor helping veterans file claims and earned numerous civilian awards for his efforts to aid other veterans despite constant problems with his one functioning eye, a holdover from his World War II wounds.

Death

Bush died of a heart ailment at the age of 79 on June 7, 2004, in Waukegan, Illinois.

He is buried at Ascension Catholic Cemetery Libertyville, Illinois. His grave can be found in Section 7, Block 10, Lot 63.

== Medal of Honor citation ==
The President of the United States takes pride in presenting the MEDAL OF HONOR to

CORPORAL RICHARD E. BUSH
UNITED STATES MARINE CORPS RESERVE

for service as set forth in the following CITATION:

For conspicuous gallantry and intrepidity at the risk of his life above and beyond the call of duty as Squad Leader serving with the First Battalion, Fourth Marines, Sixth Marine Division, in action against Japanese forces during the final assault against Mt. Yaetake on Okinawa, Ryukyu Islands, April 16, 1945. Rallying his men forward with indomitable determination, Corporal Bush boldly defied the slashing fury of concentrated Japanese artillery fire pouring down from the gun-studded mountain fortress to lead his squad up the face of the rocky precipice, sweep over the ridge and drive the defending troops from their deeply entrenched position. With his unit, the first to break through to the inner defense of Mt. Yaetake, he fought relentlessly in the forefront of the action until seriously wounded and evacuated with others under protecting rocks. Although prostrate under medical treatment when a Japanese hand grenade landed in the midst of the group, Corporal Bush, alert and courageous in extremity as in battle, unhesitatingly pulled the deadly missile to himself and absorbed the shattering violence of the exploding charge in his own body, thereby saving his fellow Marines from severe injury or death despite the certain peril to his own life. By his valiant leadership and aggressive tactics in the face of savage opposition, Corporal Bush contributed materially to the success of the sustained drive toward the conquest of this fiercely defended outpost of the Japanese Empire and his constant concern for the welfare of his men, his resolute spirit of self- sacrifice and his unwavering devotion to duty throughout the bitter conflict enhance and sustain the highest traditions of the United States Naval Service.

/S/HARRY S. TRUMAN

== Military decorations & awards ==

Medal of Honor	Purple Heart	Combat Action Ribbon
American Campaign Medal	Asiatic-Pacific Campaign Medal w/ 3 service stars	World War II Victory Medal

== See also ==
- List of Medal of Honor recipients
- List of Medal of Honor recipients for World War II
