= 12th Littoral Combat Team =

USMC littoral combat team based out of Camp Hansen, Okinawa, Japan

- Active: April 1911 – January 2025, March 2025 - present
- Country: United States of America
- Branch: United States Marine Corps
- Type: Marines
- Size: 800
- Part of: 12th Marine Littoral Regiment; 3rd Marine Division
- Garrison/HQ: Marine Corps Base Camp Butler
- Motto: "One Team One Fight"
- Engagements: Dominican campaign World War II: Battle of Corregidor; Battle of Guam; Battle of Okinawa; Vietnam War: Operation Prairie; Operation Prairie IV; Operation Kentucky; Mayaguez incident; War in Afghanistan (2001-2021) Iraq War (US phase, 2003-2011) Operation Inherent Resolve

12th Littoral Combat Team (12LCT) is a littoral combat team based at Camp Hansen, in Okinawa, Japan. Previously designated 1st Battalion, 4th Marines - an infantry battalion - of the United States Marine Corps and based at Marine Corps Base Camp Pendleton, California. In January 2025, 1st Battalion, 4th Marines was deactivated. Its elements were subsequently reorganized into the 12th Littoral Combat Team and reestablished on March 3, 2025, as part of the 12th Marine Littoral Regiment, which operates under the 3rd Marine Division.

Marine takes aim at a target during a sustainment training exercise in Djibouti, 2013.

== Subordinate units ==
- Headquarters and Service Company
- A Company
- B Company
- C Company
- Medium Range Missile Battery
- Fire and reconnaissance

== Mission ==
Conducts artillery observer, counter-reconnaissance, employs and enables multi-domain fires, establishes expeditionary sites in order to support the maritime campaign across the competition continuum, littoral warfare, and reconnaissance.

== History ==
=== Formation ===
The battalion was originally activated in April 1911 as the 1st Battalion, 4th Marine Regiment. The battalion first saw combat in November 1916 in the Dominican Republic, where 1st Lieutenant Ernest Williams was awarded the battalion's first Medal of Honor. The mission in the Dominican Republic was to protect foreign lives and property and to provide the "muscle" for a military government whose strategic goal was to bring stability to the troubled island republic. In 1924, the battalion returned to its home base in San Diego, California. During 1926 to 1927 the battalion guarded mail in a variety of outposts throughout the Western U.S.

The period from February 1927 to November 1941 was the timeframe for the deployment of the battalion in China, which would leave an enduring mark on its history. This service in Shanghai earned the battalion the title "China Marines" and started the practice of using the Chinese dragon in different official and unofficial logos and mast heads. In November 1941 the battalion along with the entire 4th Marines deployed from China to the Philippines.

=== World War II ===
The outbreak of World War II found the battalion serving as part of the U.S. Forces defending the Philippines. Ordered to the strategic island of Corregidor, the battalion fiercely defended their assigned sectors against overwhelming enemy forces. In the end, General Jonathan M. Wainwright, United States Army, ordered the battalion to surrender, in an effort to save lives against the hopeless situation. After the surrender, the battalion ceased to exist. As prisoners the men would endure torture and incredible hardships.

On 7 August 1942 the 1st Raider Battalion, assigned to the 1st Marine Division, landed on Tulagi in the British Solomon Islands as the opening phases of the Guadalcanal campaign commenced. After Tulagi was captured, the Raiders were moved to Guadalcanal to defend Henderson Field. One of their most notable engagements was the "Battle of Edson's Ridge", where the 1st Raiders scored a major victory over Japanese forces. For their heroic combat leadership, Colonel Merritt Edson and Major Kenneth Bailey were both awarded the Medal of Honor, the latter posthumously.

On 1 February 1944 a new 1st Battalion, 4th Marines was activated by the redesignation of the 1st Marine Raider Battalion to 1st Battalion, 4th Marines. For the remainder of World War II the battalion would fight at two of the bloodiest campaigns in the Pacific, Guam and Okinawa. Corporal Richard E. Bush was awarded the Medal of Honor for his gallant actions on Okinawa. Of note, the 4th Marines, adopted the motto, "Hold High the Torch" during this period. This legendary phrase served as a symbolic pledge to the warriors of the old 4th Marines who were captured at Corregidor.

From 1945 to 1952 the battalion would go through a series of deactivations and reactivations both overseas and in the U.S. The most notable service during this period was in China during 1946 where the battalion, belonging to the 6th Marine Division, participated in the occupation of North China. The battalion was deactivated in November 1947 and remained so until 1952. The battalion would spend the Korean War stationed in Camp Nara, Japan. In 1955, the battalion was transferred to Kaneohe Bay, Hawaii and would serve in the 1st Marine Brigade.

=== Vietnam War ===
In the spring of 1965 the battalion deployed to combat in South Vietnam. From 1965 to 1969 the battalion engaged in numerous conventional and counter-insurgency operations in the I Corps. Some of the major operations that 1/4 was involved in were Operation Prairie, Operation Beacon Hill, Operation Prairie IV, Operation Deckhouse IV, Operation Kentucky, Operation Purple Martin and Operation Napoleon/Saline would be fought from places such as the Rockpile, Camp Carroll, Con Thien and Ca Lu Combat Base.

Corporal Larry Maxam and Private First Class Douglas Dickey both heroically gave their lives in Vietnam and were posthumously awarded the Medal of Honor for their brave actions.

In November 1969 the battalion was redeployed to Okinawa and would also serve off the coast of Vietnam. The battalion participated in the rescue of the SS Mayaguez in May 1975.

=== 1980s ===
In 1977 the battalion moved to Twentynine Palms, CA and remained there until 1989.

In 1988, after receiving Amphibious Assault Boat training at NSW Coronado, members of Bravo Company 1/4 from MCAGCC (Marine Corps Air Ground Combat Center) 29 Palms, were deployed from May 1988 to Okinawa, Japan for additional helicopter "fast rope" ship insertion training, before being deployed to the Persian Gulf aboard the USS Dubuque (LPD-8), and the MSB Hercules as members of III MEF/CMAGTF 3-88 during the Iran/Iraq War, in support of the Largest naval convoy operation since World War II, code named Operation Earnest Will, which earned the members of Bravo Company 1/4 the Armed Forces Expeditionary Medal. Bravo Company 1/4 returned to 29 Palms in December 1988, and 1st Battalion, 4th Marines 29 Palms were redesignated as 3rd Battalion, 7th Marines 7th MEB (Marine Expeditionary Force), 29 Palms.

=== 1990s ===
The battalion's history during the 1990s and into the 21st century was highlighted by expeditionary operations in support of national objectives in Southwest Asia, Eritrea, Kenya, Somalia and drug interdiction operations along the U.S. border. In January 1989 1st Battalion, 4th Marines were assigned to 1st Marines at Camp Horno, aboard Camp Pendleton. In August 1990 the battalion deployed aboard ship to the Persian Gulf in support of Operation Desert Shield/Desert Storm.

=== Afghanistan and Iraq ===
The September 11 terrorist attacks led to the United States invasion of Afghanistan. In March 2002, as part of the 13th Marine Expeditionary Unit Special Operations Capable, the battalion served as a reserve force, for Operation Anaconda, and others, in support of the initial combat operations in Afghanistan.

In March 2003 the battalion was part of the initial ground invasion in support of Operation Iraqi Freedom. The battalion fought its way through Iraq conducting combat operations in the cities of An Nasiriyah, Al Kut, Ah Numinayah, Abu Garaf, Hasan Al Hamzah (where Bravo Company lost Private First Class, Juan G. Garza), Ah Shatrah, Saddam City (Later Revolution City and Sadar City), Qalat Sakar, Al Hillah, Al Hayy, and Baghdad.

In May 2004, the battalion with the 11th Marine Expeditionary Unit, the battalion again returned to combat in Iraq for a 9-month deployment, which was highlighted by a major victory against insurgent forces in Najaf, after the fighting at Najaf cemetery, Bravo Company guarded Abu Ghanrib prison and supported Operation Phantom Fury.

In 2005 elements of the battalion supported Hurricane Katrina disaster relief efforts in Mississippi and Louisiana. After the Hurricane relief, in 2006, the battalion deployed on the 11th Marine Expeditionary Unit in support of the Western Pacific Deployment and conducted training in Kuwait in support of OEF 6–7.

From 2007 to 2009 the battalion conducted two more tours in Iraq, supporting Operation Iraqi Freedom. In spring of 2007 the battalion deployed to the Iraqi province of Al Anbar conducting operations in Al Qaim region, centered around the cities of Husaybah, Rawa, Anah. The battalion conducted thousands of mounted and dismounted combat infantry patrols, ensuring that the population was able to conduct business, travel and move around freely in a secure environment. In addition, the battalion was also tasked with training the Iraqi National Police and Iraqi National Army on counter-insurgency tactics and techniques.

In the fall of 2008, the battalion again deployed to Iraq province of Al Anbar, conducting combat and counterinsurgency operations in the war-torn city of Fallujah and outlying districts. The battalion was one of the last infantry battalions of Marines to conduct combat operations in Iraq.

In May 2010 the battalion attached to the 15th Marine Expeditionary Unit in support of the Western Pacific deployment. During this deployment, the battalion executed the first anti-piracy in the Marine Corps in over 200 years by capturing the pirated motor vessel, Magellan Star. Additionally, the battalion supported humanitarian relief operations in response to the 2010 Pakistan floods.

In 2012 the battalion deployed to Okinawa, Japan as the ground combat element for the 31st Marine Expeditionary Unit. The battalion successfully completed operations throughout the Asia-Pacific region. Highlights of this tour included exercises in Thailand, Korea and the Philippines.

In February 2013, the battalion attached to the 13th Marine Expeditionary Unit. In the spring of 2015 1/4 deployed in support of Marine Rotational Forces-Darwin to Darwin, Northern Territory, Australia. This deployment was the first reinforced Marine Battalion deployment to Australia. 1/4 is the Battalion Landing Team attached to the 11th Marine Expeditionary Unit augmented with attachments including a tank platoon, artillery battery, Light Armored Reconnaissance Company, Amphibious Assault Vehicle Platoon, and Combat Engineer platoon.

In March 2017, the battalion was deployed to Syria to provide artillery support with their M777 howitzers for forces seeking to eject ISIL forces from Raqqa.

In late July 2020, personnel from the unit, attached to 15th Marine Expeditionary Unit, were training with their Amphibious Assault Vehicles near San Clemente Island off the coast of Southern California. A mishap resulted in the loss of eight Marines and one Sailor. In October of that same year, the commanding general of 1st Marine Expeditionary Force, Lt. Gen. Karsten Heckl, relieved the commanding officer of the unit, Lt. Col. Michael J. Regner, because of a "loss in trust and confidence in his ability to command" as a result of that accident.

In January 2021, Battalion Landing Team 1/4, as part of the 15th MEU provided security ashore in Somalia and quick reaction force support from the sea during the execution of USAFRICOM Operation OCTAVE QUARTZ.

=== Redesignation as a Littoral Combat Team ===
On January 10, 2025, the battalion was redesignated as 12th Littoral Combat Team, 12th Marine Littoral Regiment, 3d Marine Division.

== Medal of Honor recipients ==
=== Dominican Republic recipients ===
- Brigadier General Roswell Winans received the Medal of Honor for his actions in Guayacanas on 3 July 1916. First Sergeant Winans, at that time, drove back entrenched enemy forces during the line of march.
- First Lieutenant Ernest Calvin Williams received the Medal of Honor for his actions during the U.S. occupation of the Dominican Republic on 29 November 1916. Williams over took a prison against hostile forces at San Francisco de Macoris while commanding only a dozen men.

=== World War II recipients ===
- Corporal Richard E. Bush received the Medal of Honor for his actions during the Battle of Okinawa, 16 April 1945.
- Major Kenneth D. Bailey received the Medal of Honor posthumously for heroic conduct during action during the Battle of Guadalcanal in the Solomon Islands. For extraordinary courage and heroic conduct above and beyond the call of duty as commanding officer of Company C during the enemy Japanese attack on Henderson Field.
- Major General Merritt A. Edson for extraordinary heroism and conspicuous intrepidity above and beyond the call of duty as Commanding Officer of the 1st Marine Raider Battalion during action against enemy Japanese forces in the Solomon Islands on the night of 13–14 September 1942.

=== Vietnam War recipients ===
- Corporal Larry L. Maxam was posthumously awarded the Medal of Honor for his actions on 2 February 1968 while participating in Operation Kentucky. Cpl Maxam single-handedly defended half of the perimeter of Cam Lo District Headquarters, Quảng Trị Province, Vietnam against heavy enemy attack.
- Private First Class Douglas E. Dickey received the Medal of Honor posthumously for actions while participating in Operation Beacon Hill 1, 26 March 1967. PFC Dickey threw himself upon a grenade, absorbing with his body the full and complete force of the explosion.

== Notable members ==
- William R. Higgins, B Company Commander during the Vietnam War
- Seth W. Moulton, U.S. Representative for Massachusetts' 6th Congressional District; 2020 Democratic Presidential Primary candidate
- Karl Marlantes, Author and Navy Cross recipient
- Randy Orton, Professional Wrestler and Actor

=== Sergeants Major of the Marine Corps ===
- The 9th Sergeant Major of the Marine Corps Leland D. Crawford (retired) served in 1st Battalion 4th Marines, Alpha Company, from June 1967 to June 1968 in Republic of Vietnam.
- The 12th Sergeant Major of the Marine Corps Harold G. Overstreet (retired) served in 1st Battalion 4th Marines, Bravo and Charlie Company, from March 1981 to August 1983 onboard MCAGCC Twenty-nine Palms California.
- The 13th Sergeant Major of the Marine Corps Lewis G. Lee (retired) served in 1st Battalion 4th Marines, Alpha Company, from August 1968 to June 1969 in Republic of Vietnam.
- The 17th Sergeant Major of the Marine Corps Micheal Barrett served in 1st Battalion 4th Marines, Bravo Company, from November 1981 to August 1984 onboard MCAGCC Twenty-nine Palms, California.

== Gallery ==
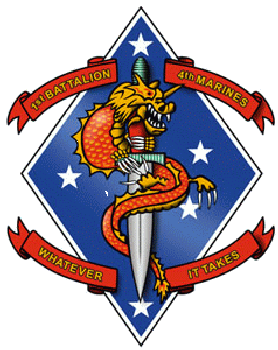
Insignia for 1st Battalion, 4th Marines

== Battalion honors ==
During its history, the 1st Battalion 4th Marines has received these honors.

- Presidential Unit Citation-3 Bronze Stars
- Presidential Unit Citation (Army)-1 Bronze Oak Leaf
- Joint Meritorious Unit Citation
- Navy/Marine Unit Citation-2 Bronze Stars
- Navy/Marine Meritorious Unit Citation-1 Bronze Star
- Marine Corps Expeditionary Medal
- Yangtze Service Streamer-1 Bronze star
- China Service Medal-1 Bronze Star
- American Defense-1 Bronze Star
- Asiatic-Pacific Service-1 Silver Star, 2 Bronze Stars
- World War II Victory
- Navy Occupation-Asia Device
- National Defense-2 Bronze Stars
- Korean Service
- Armed Forces Expeditionary Medal
- Vietnam Service
- South West Asia-3 Bronze Stars
- Humanitarian Service Medal
- Philippine Defense Medal-1 Bronze Star
- Philippine Republic Presidential Unit Citation
- Vietnam Gallantry Cross
- Vietnam Meritorious Unit Citation Civil Actions
- Kuwait Liberation (Saudi Arabia)
- Kuwait Liberation (Kuwait)

== See also ==
- 3d Littoral Combat Team
- China Marines
- Organization of the United States Marine Corps
- List of United States Marine Corps battalions
