= Kit Carson Scouts =

- Lực Lượng 66
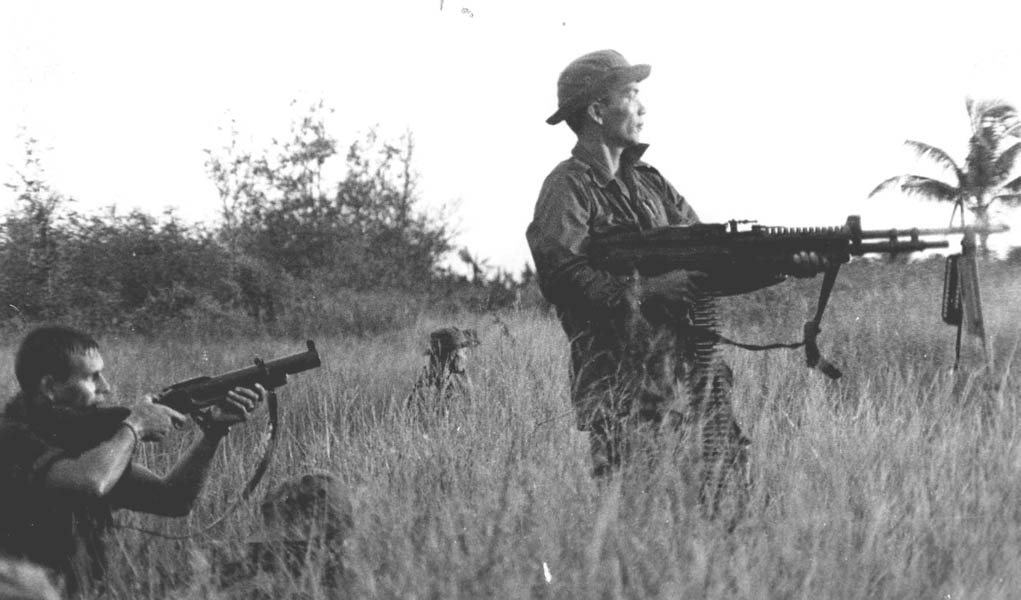
- A "Tiger Scout", as the Kit Carsons were called in the U.S. 9th Infantry Division, firing an M60 machine gun
- Active: 1966–1972
- Country: South Vietnam
- Allegiance: United States, Australia, South Korea, Thailand
- Type: Scouts
- Role: Anti-guerrilla warfare Artillery observer Clandestine operation Counterinsurgency; Direct action HUMINT; Jungle warfare Long-range penetration Raiding; Reconnaissance; Special reconnaissance Tracking
- Size: ~2,300 (peak strength)
- Engagements: Vietnam War

The Kit Carson Scouts (also known as Tiger Scouts or Lực Lượng 66) belonged to a special program initially created by the United States Marine Corps (USMC) during the Vietnam War involving the use of former Viet Cong (VC) and People's Army of Vietnam (PAVN) personnel as anti-guerrilla forces, clandestine operation, combat patrol, and intelligence scouts for American infantry units. VC and PAVN combatants who defected and became aligned with the South Vietnamese government were known as Hồi Chánh, a term loosely translated as "members who have returned to the righteous side". Only a very small number of these Hồi Chánh were selected, trained, and deployed with the USMC and later also other American and Allied (non-Vietnamese) infantry units between 1966 and 1973.

== History ==
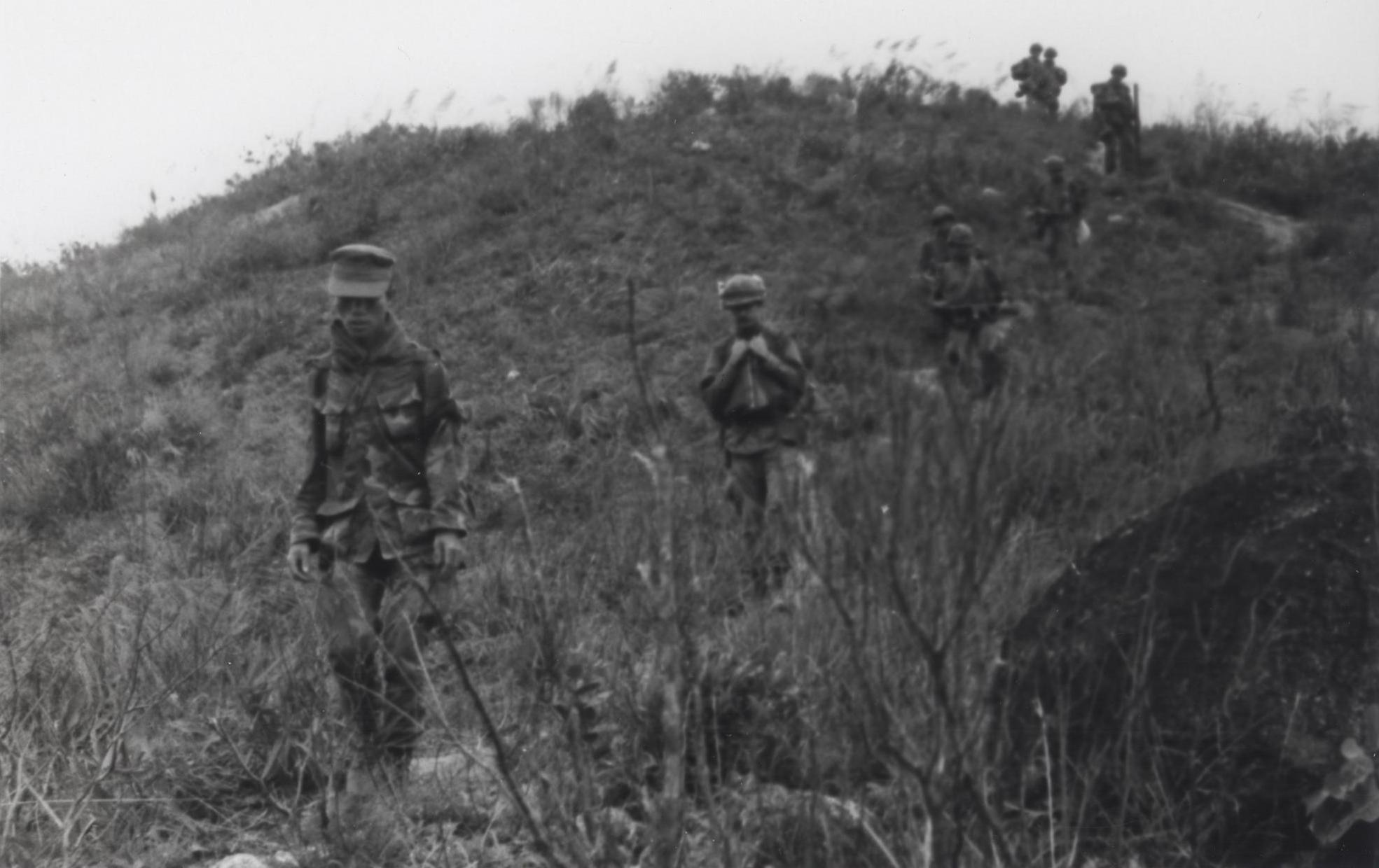
U.S. Marines, led by a Vietnamese Kit Carson Scout during Operation Oklahoma Hills on March 31, 1969

The concept of using soldiers who had previously fought on the enemy side in this way originated in late 1966 with the 5th Counterintelligence Team, which had counterintelligence tasks within the Da Nang Chiêu Hồi Center as one responsibility. Major General Herman Nickerson Jr., commanding the 1st Marine Division (1st MARDIV) at the time, named them Kit Carson Scouts after Kit Carson the American frontiersman.

The first six Kit Carson Scouts were placed in the field with the 1st Marine Regiment and 9th Marine Regiments as part of a trial program in October 1966. All but one of the original group of six were later killed in action. The VC defectors initially recruited to work as intelligence scouts with USMC infantry units were paid by the U.S. military and were treated as staff non-commissioned officers with a nominal rank (not official) of staff sergeant.

From October to December 1966, III Marine Amphibious Force (III MAF) credited Kit Carson Scouts with killing 47 VC, recovering 16 weapons and discovering 18 mines and tunnels. By the end of 1966, 19 scouts were serving with the 1st Marine Division. By the end of 1967, the 132 Scouts serving with the Marines in I Corps were credited with killing 58 more VC, capturing 37 and recovering 82 weapons. General Lewis William Walt ordered the program to be adopted throughout III MAF and a Kit Carson training center was established at Da Nang to standardize training.

On 29 April 1967, the Intelligence Section of the Military Assistance Command, Vietnam (MACV) published a procedural document detailing the expansion of the Kit Carson Scout Program for all active U.S. Army units in the country, including the scout's terms of service and wages. In September 1967, General William Westmoreland issued an order directing all infantry divisions in Vietnam, including U.S. Army units, to begin using Kit Carson Scouts in conjunction with friendly operations. He directed that a minimum of 100 scouts per division was necessary to ensure effectiveness with a target of 1,500 scouts by the end of 1968.

In 1968, the number of Kit Carson Scouts increased from 132 to 476, with 102 serving with the 1st Marine Division, 106 with the 3rd Marine Division, 153 with the 101st Airborne Division, and 115 with the 23rd Infantry Division, with a further 22 undergoing training. Throughout the year, Kit Carson Scouts were credited with killing 312 VC/PAVN, apprehending 851 suspects as well as locating 720 tunnels and supply caches and over 1,300 booby-traps.

During 1969, the number of Kit Carson Scouts working with III MAF grew from 476 to 597 despite the redeployment of the 3rd Marine Division during the year. The Kit Carson Scouts were credited with killing 191 VC/PAVN, capturing 539 and recovering 195 weapons, and locating 143 tunnels and caches and 518 booby-traps. In January 1969, Kit Carson Scouts began being assigned to Allied forces, starting with the 1st Australian Task Force, followed by the Royal Thai Army Expeditionary Division in August 1969 and South Korean forces in December 1970.

At the beginning of 1970, over 2,300 scouts served with U.S. forces, with 165 serving in the III MAF. III MAF recruited potential scouts from Chiêu Hồi centers in Da Nang and Hoi An. An experienced Marine NCO investigated the background of motivation of each potential recruit and those who passed would then go to a training center west of Danang for 28 days of training and evaluation. Class sizes were small, usually consisting of no more than eight men. Training including fieldcraft, field sketching, use of sensors and basic English. As the Marines redeployed from South Vietnam the number of Kit Carson Scouts serving with III MAF dropped to 111 in July and 95 in December. During 1970, III MAF scouts were credited with killing 43 VC, capturing 313 and recovering 96 weapons.

A report given to the U.S. Senate Foreign Relations Committee in February 1970 listed 230 Kit Carson Scouts killed in action and 716 wounded.In June 1970, as part of the Vietnamization program, the Kit Carson Program name was changed to Lực Lượng 66 (Vietnamese for Force 66), but Kit Carson Scouts numbers declined as U.S. forces withdrew from South Vietnam with only 400 scouts serving by the end of 1970.

== Motivation ==
Most Kit Carson Scouts were Hồi Chánh, former members of the People’s Liberation Armed Forces (PLAF) of South Vietnam or the People’s Army of Vietnam (PAVN) who had voluntarily defected through the South Vietnamese government’s Chieu Hoi program. After spending approximately 45–60 days at a Chieu Hoi center, defectors could choose among several forms of employment or resettlement, and some volunteered to become Kit Carson Scouts. The reasons for these decisions varied considerably. Stefan Aguirre Quiroga’s research on the scout's motivation identifies forced conscription, harsh discipline, malnutrition and exhaustion, inadequate food and medicine, fear of death or injury, mistreatment of themselves or their families, revenge, and political disillusionment as recurring reasons for defection. For some South Vietnamese defectors, the prospect of better pay, improved living conditions, medical care, and the ability to support or remain close to their families also influenced the decision to become a scout. North Vietnamese defectors faced different circumstances: family members remained largely in North Vietnam and could face reprisals for a soldier’s defection, making defection considerably more difficult. Their motivations included fear of death, physical hardship, homesickness, political disillusionment, and dissatisfaction with PAVN discipline and conditions.

The choice made by defectors to join the Kit Carson Scouts were shaped by pragmatic considerations as well as personal experiences and political disillusionment. The scouts received substantially better pay and living conditions than they had generally experienced in the PLAF or PAVN, including regular rations, housing, uniforms and equipment, and eventually full medical and dental treatment in American and allied facilities. Their salaries were also considerably higher than those of PLAF soldiers, making employment as a scout particularly significant for men responsible for supporting families.

== Relationship with American soldiers ==
The relationship between American soldiers and Kit Carson Scouts developed within a complicated mixture of practical dependence, initial suspicion, and personal camaraderie. The scouts were integrated directly into American units because their knowledge of the local terrain, enemy forces, language, and guerrilla tactics was considered valuable. Yet their status as former PLAF or PAVN combatants meant that some Americans initially distrusted them. Communication could also be difficult: although the scouts received English instruction, its effectiveness varied, and some American soldiers reported problems communicating with them. In practice, however, repeated cooperation in the field could produce mutual trust. Historian Stefan Aguirre Quiroga notes that some American soldiers came to rely heavily on their scouts, particularly because the scouts served as guides and point men, helped identify enemy activity, and could warn American troops about ambushes and booby traps.

This developing relationship was also shaped by American cultural ideas about the Old West and the “Indian scout.” Aguirre Quiroga argues that American soldiers frequently understood the Kit Carson Scouts through this historical and popular-cultural framework, imagining themselves as frontier soldiers and the Vietnamese scouts as a modern equivalent of Native American auxiliaries. This metaphor could help make the presence of former enemies within American units intelligible, but it also imposed an American identity upon the scouts that they did not necessarily share. Nevertheless, personal relationships could transcend these stereotypes. Aguirre Quiroga finds evidence of American soldiers remembering individual scouts by name and describing them as trusted companions or comrades; some veterans retained strong memories of “my” or “our” Kit Carson Scout long after the war. At the same time, these accounts were overwhelmingly produced by Americans and often portrayed the scouts as loyal, courageous, or exceptionally capable, while giving the Vietnamese men themselves comparatively little voice. Thus, the relationship was simultaneously one of military cooperation and genuine personal attachment, but also of unequal representation and culturally imposed expectations.
