= Edwin J. Hill =

US Navy Medal of Honor recipient (1894–1941)

Edwin Joseph Hill
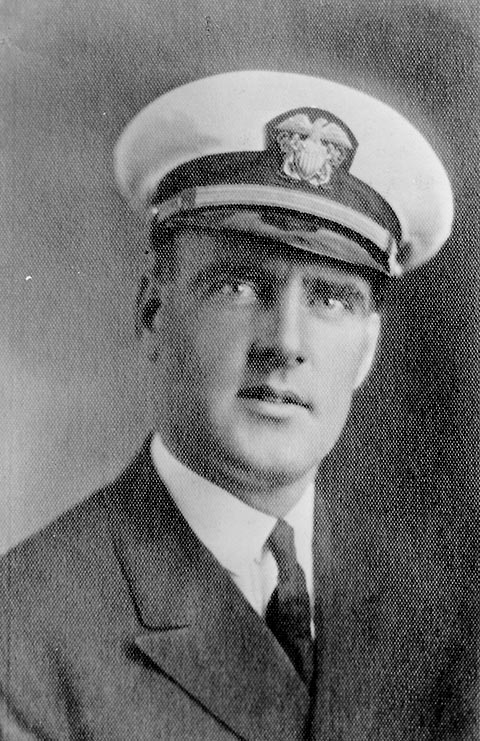
- Chief Boatswain Edwin J. Hill
- Born: October 4, 1894; Philadelphia, Pennsylvania, United States
- Died: December 7, 1941 (aged 47); Pearl Harbor, Hawaii, United States
- Burial place: National Memorial Cemetery of the Pacific (plot A-895), Honolulu, Hawaii
- Military career
- Allegiance: United States of America
- Branch: United States Navy
- Service years: 1912-1941
- Rank: Chief Boatswain
- Unit: USS Nevada
- Conflicts: World War II: Attack on Pearl Harbor †
- Awards: Medal of Honor

Edwin Joseph Hill (October 4, 1894 - December 7, 1941), was a United States Navy sailor who was stationed on the USS Nevada (BB-36) during the attack on Pearl Harbor, Hawaii, on December 7, 1941. He posthumously received the Medal of Honor for his actions during the battle.

Hill is most noted for having released the USS Nevada from its mooring, and then as the battleship began to steam away, jumping into the harbor, swimming after the ship, and then climbing up the battleship onto its deck to continue the fight.

== Early life ==
Hill was born October 4, 1895 to John J. and Helen Halpin Hill, in Philadelphia, Pennsylvania. He was the sixth of eight children. After his parents separated, he was raised in Cape May, New Jersey, home of his mother's family, the Halpins. He married Catherine Coughlin on October 28, 1920.

== Military career ==
Hill enlisted in the United States Navy in 1912, rising to the warrant officer rank of chief boatswain by 1924. He is a first cousin to Captain (later Rear Admiral) Herman J. Kossler, commander of the submarine USS Cavalla (SS-244) during World War II and a recipient of the Navy Cross and three Silver Stars.

During the December 7, 1941, Japanese attack on Pearl Harbor, he was serving on board USS Nevada (BB-36). The Nevada was the only battleship that morning to attempt to make its way out of Pearl Harbor. In the midst of the attack, Hill led the ship's line-handling detail in casting off from the quays alongside Ford Island so that Nevada could get underway.

In particular, Hill is noted for having dived off the back of the Nevada into the harbor, climbing onto the dock to release the battleship from its mooring, diving back into the harbor to swim after the ship as it steamed away, and climbing back up the Nevada to resume his duties on board during the attack.

Hill was attempting to drop anchor at the end of the battleship's brief sortie when he was killed by enemy bombs that struck the bow of the ship, claiming the lives of Hill and 46 other Nevada crewmen. Hill's body was found impacted with bullet wounds, suggesting that he may have been killed by gunfire; whether or not these wounds were sustained before or after the bomb blast will never be known; his Medal of Honor citation reports the bomb blast as being the cause of death.

Several surviving Nevada crewmen, who at time were young men of 18 and 19 years old, credit Hill with saving their lives by ordering them during the action to take protective cover behind the ship's gun turrets. (Presumably the veteran Hill recognized that these younger sailors, being completely mentally unprepared for a sudden full-scale sneak attack, would have been at great risk of becoming "cannon fodder", prompting his order for them to take cover.) These former sailors mention that Hill, who was 46 years old at the time of the attack and had 30 years of naval service, had a level of respect on par with the captain of the Nevada himself.

Hill, his wife Catherine, and their three young children resided in Long Beach, California.

For his heroism during the Pearl Harbor action, Chief Boatswain Hill posthumously received the Medal of Honor. He is buried in the National Memorial Cemetery of the Pacific (plot A-895) in Honolulu, Hawaii. His grave can be found in section A, grave 895.

== Medal of Honor citation ==
Medal of Honor citation:

For distinguished conduct in the line of his profession, extraordinary courage, and disregard of his own safety during the attack on the Fleet in Pearl Harbor, by Japanese forces on December 7, 1941. During the height of the strafing and bombing, Chief Boatswain Hill led his men of the linehandling details of the U.S.S. Nevada to the quays, cast off the lines and swam back to his ship. Later, while on the forecastle, attempting to let go the anchors, he was blown overboard and killed by the explosion of several bombs.

=== Namesake ===
In 1943, the United States Navy named a destroyer escort USS Hill (DE-141) in his honor.

== Awards and decorations ==

1st row	Medal of Honor		
2nd Row	Purple Heart	Combat Action Ribbon	Navy Good Conduct Medal
3rd Row	Mexican Service Medal	World War I Victory Medal	American Defense Service Medal with Fleet clasp
4th Row	American Campaign Medal	Asiatic-Pacific Campaign Medal with one campaign star	World War II Victory Medal

== See also ==
- List of Medal of Honor recipients
