= Kenneth N. Good =

U.S. Army officer (1930–1963)

Kenneth Newlon Good
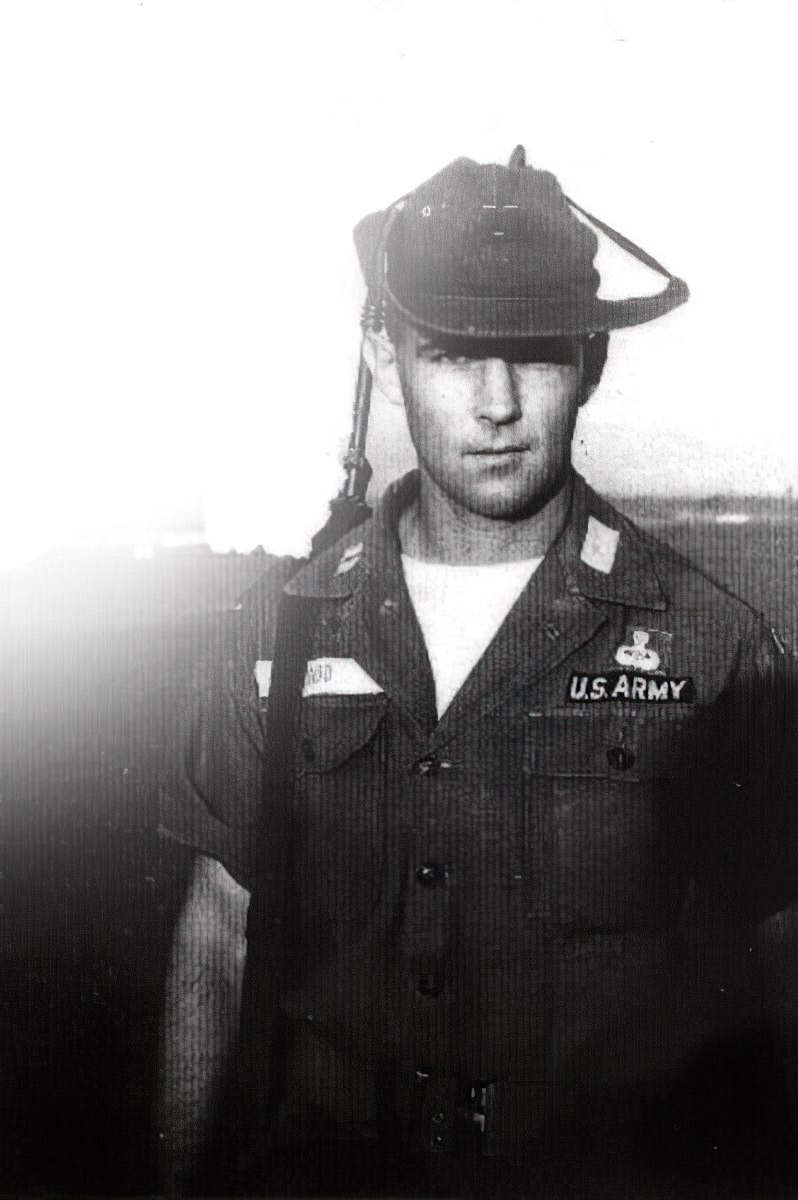
- Born: November 30, 1930; Hollywood, California, U.S.
- Died: January 2, 1963 (aged 32); Ấp Bắc Hamlet, Định Tường Province, South Vietnam
- Burial place: National Memorial Cemetery of the Pacific
- Education: United States Military Academy
- Spouse: Barbara May Waterhouse (m. 1952)
- Children: 3
- Military career
- Allegiance: United States
- Branch: United States Army
- Service years: 1952–1963
- Rank: Captain
- Unit: 7th Infantry Division
- Conflicts: Vietnam War; Battle of Ap Bac †

Kenneth Newlon Good (November 30, 1930 – January 2, 1963) was a U.S. Army officer who served as an advisor during the Vietnam War. He was killed at the Battle of Ap Bac. He was an assistant professor of military science and a University of Hawaii ROTC instructor. He was the third Hawaiian to be killed during the Vietnam War.

== Life ==
Good was born on November 30, 1930, in Hollywood, California. He attended South Pasadena High School. He graduated from the United States Military Academy in 1952. He qualified as a paratrooper and graduated from Fort Benning's Infantry Officer's Advance Course. He served with the 7th Infantry Division in Korea from 1958 to 1959 and served in Japan.

He arrived in South Vietnam on July 31, 1962, attached to the MAAG. He was killed in action at the battle of Ap Bac by Viet Cong gunfire. He was killed with two other Americans at the battle of Ap Bac: Donald Leon Braman and William Leander Deal.

He is buried at the National Memorial Cemetery of the Pacific. He is honored at the Vietnam Veterans Memorial, on Panel 1E, Line 15.

== Personal life ==
He married his wife, Barbara May Waterhouse, on June 5, 1952. They have three children.
