= Cam Lộ district =

Coordinates: 16.817°N 106.950°E

Cam Lộ district Huyện Cam Lộ
- District
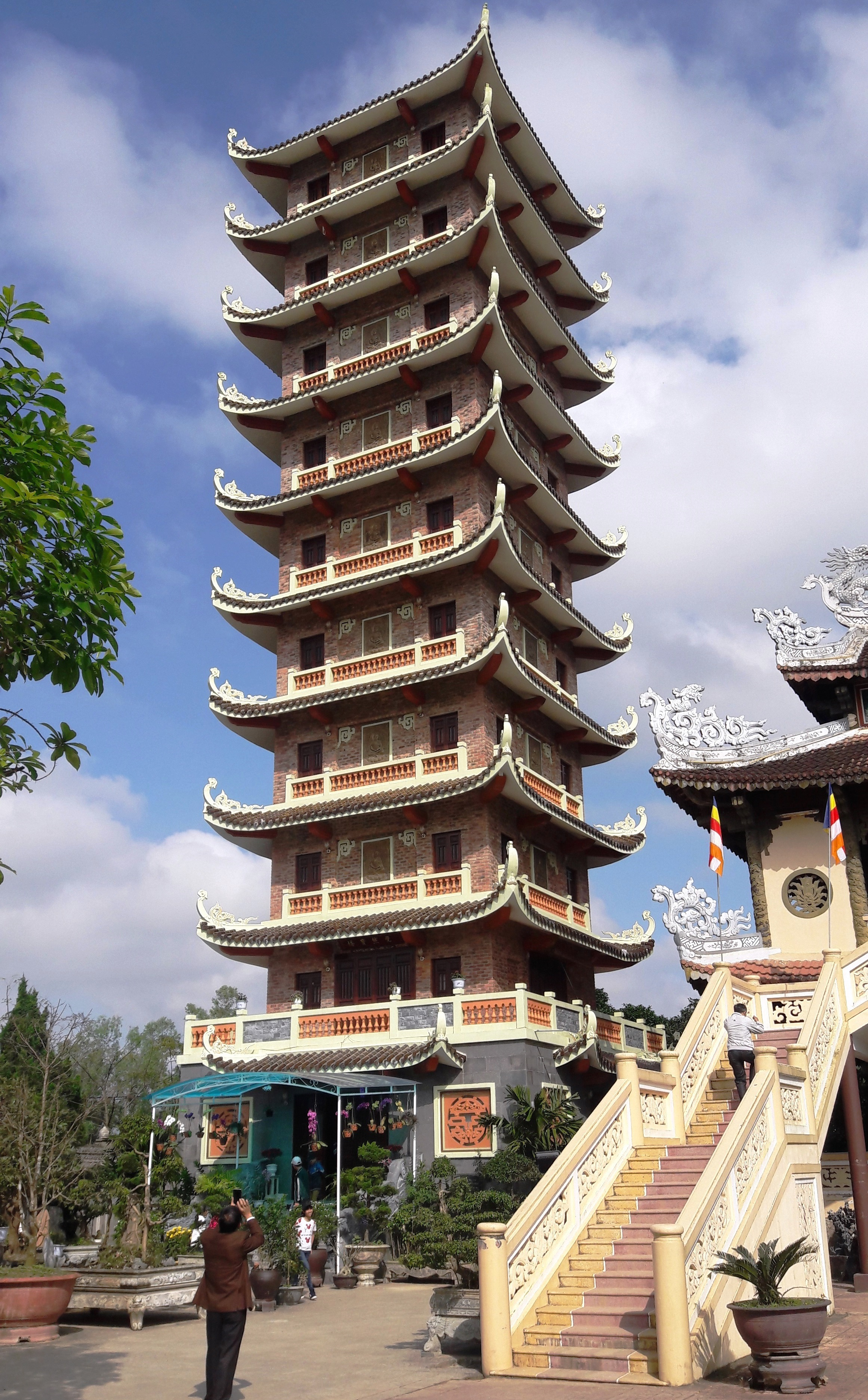
- Cam Lo Pagoda is the temple with the highest stupa in Vietnam, setting a record on May 21, 2016.
- Interactive map of Cam Lộ district
- Country: Vietnam
- Region: North Central Coast
- Province: Quảng Trị
- Capital: Cam Lộ

Area
  - Total: 134 sq mi (347 km^{2})

Population (2003)
  - Total: 46,231
- Time zone: UTC+07:00 (Indochina Time)

Cam Lộ is a rural district of Quảng Trị province in the North Central Coast region of Vietnam. As of 2003 the district had a population of 46,231. The district covers an area of 347 km^{2} (134 sq mi). The district capital lies at Cam Lộ.

== Administration subdivisions ==
The district includes a townlet Cam Lộ (capital) and eight rural communes (xã): Cam Thành, Cam An, Cam Thanh, Cam Thuỷ, Cam Tuyền, Cam Hiếu, Cam Chính, Cam Nghĩa.
