= James Howe (disambiguation) =

James Howe (born 1946) is an American author of juvenile books.

James Howe may also refer to:

- Sir James Howe, 2nd Baronet (died 1736), English politician
- James How (1716–1780), English tavern owner, occasionally spelled James Howe
- James Howe (painter) (1780–1836), Scottish animal painter
- James Henry Howe (1827–1893), U.S. federal judge
- James R. Howe (1839–1914), U.S. Representative from New York
- James Henderson Howe (1839–1920), farmer and politician in South Australia
- James Peter Howe (1854–1917), Australian politician
- James Hamilton Howe (1856–1934), U.S. pianist and dean of the music school at DePauw University
- James Wong Howe (1899–1976), Chinese-born American cinematographer
- James D. Howe (1948–1970), U.S. Medal of Honor recipient during the Vietnam War
- James Lewis Howe (1859–1955), American chemist
