= Robert D. Reem =

United States Marine Corps Medal of Honor recipient

Robert Dale Reem
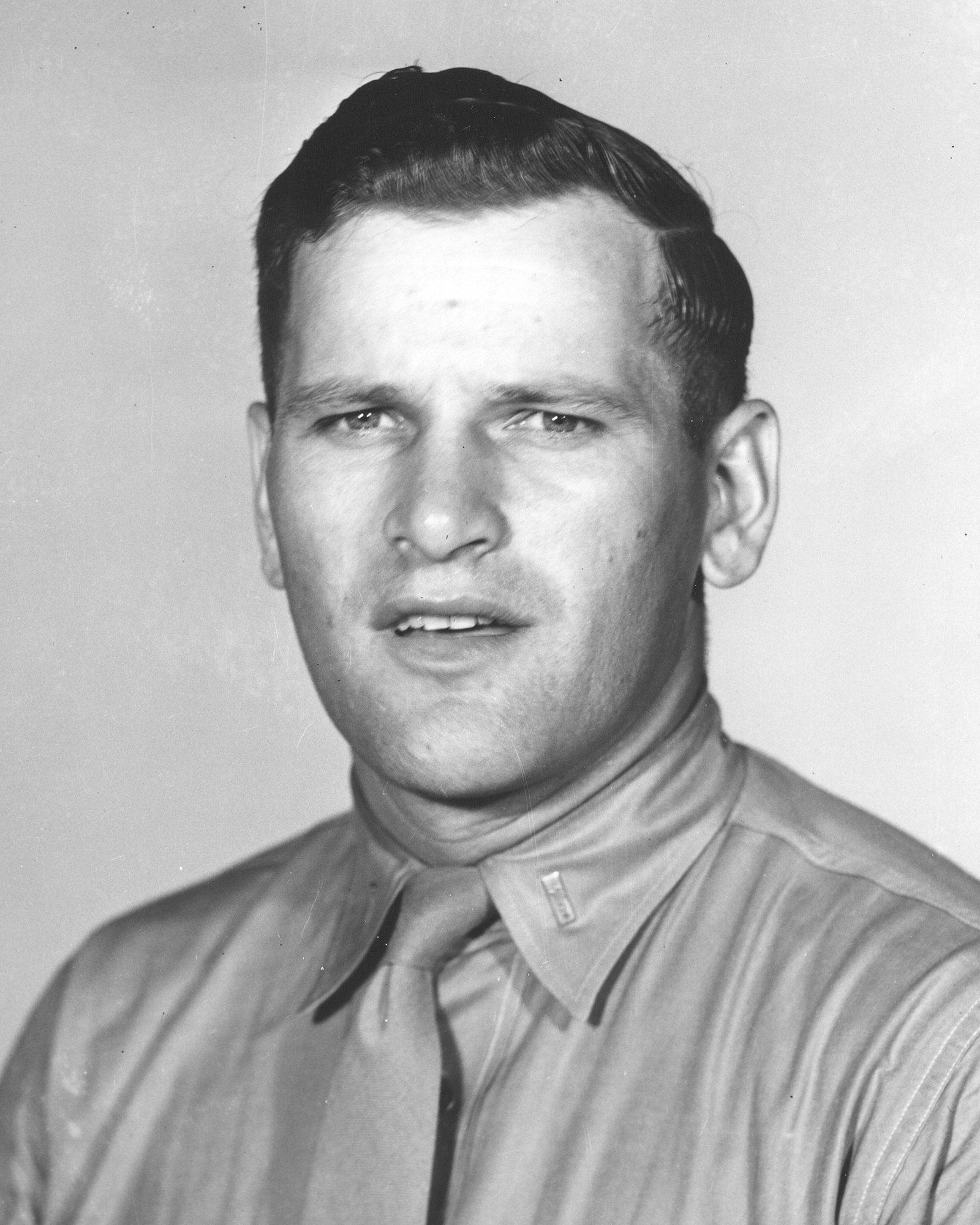
- Robert D. Reem, posthumous Medal of Honor recipient
- Born: October 20, 1925; Lancaster, Pennsylvania, US
- Died: November 6, 1950 (aged 25); Near Chinhung-ni, North Korea
- Burial place: Arlington National Cemetery
- Military career
- Allegiance: United States of America
- Branch: United States Marine Corps
- Service years: 1943 – 1950
- Rank: Second Lieutenant
- Unit: 3rd Battalion, 7th Marines
- Conflicts: World War II; Korean War: Battle of Inchon; Second Battle of Seoul; Chosin Reservoir advance †
- Awards: Medal of Honor; Purple Heart

Second Lieutenant Robert Dale Reem (October 20, 1925 – November 6, 1950) was a United States Marine Corps officer who posthumously received the United States' highest military decoration — the Medal of Honor — for his heroic actions during the advance to the Chosin Reservoir in the Korean War; he threw himself on an enemy grenade, sacrificing his life to save his men.

== Biography ==
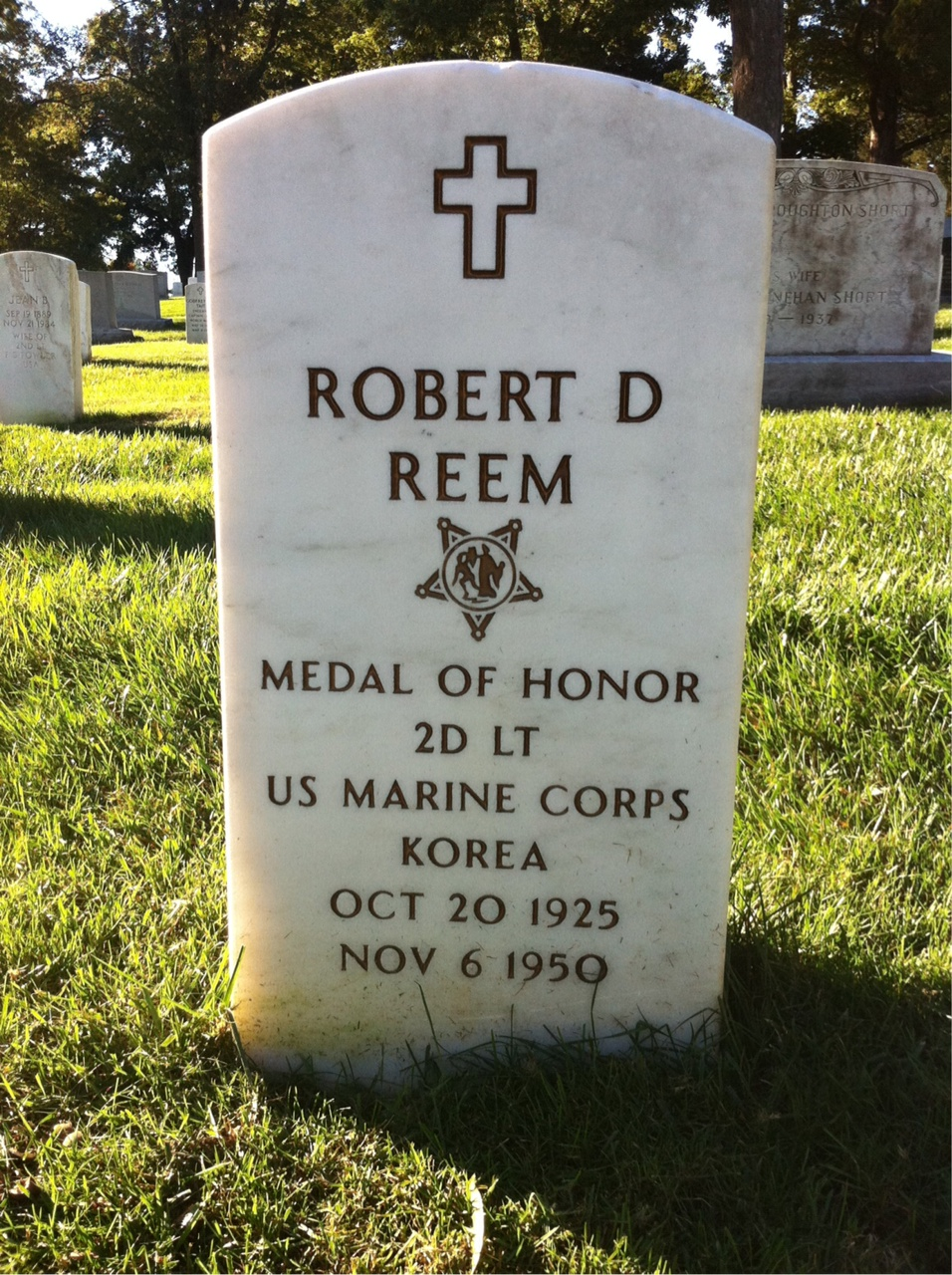
Grave at Arlington National Cemetery

Robert Dale Reem was born on October 20, 1925, in Lancaster, Pennsylvania. He graduated from Elizabethtown High School in June 1943. During his final year of high school, he was a page in the Pennsylvania House of Representatives from January to May 1943.

He enlisted in the United States Marine Corps in August 1943, completed his recruit training at Parris Island, South Carolina, in October and was selected for appointment to the Naval Academy at that time. He attended the Naval Academy Preparatory School at the Naval Training Center, Bainbridge, Maryland, before entering the academy in June 1944.

He was commissioned a Marine Corps second lieutenant on June 4, 1948, upon his graduation from Annapolis. In June 1949, he completed the Basic School at Quantico, Virginia, where he remained with the Special Training Regiment until that August. In December 1949, after several months at Camp Lejeune, North Carolina, with the 3rd Battalion, 6th Marines, 2nd Marine Division, he was assigned with that battalion to duty with the Sixth Fleet in the Mediterranean.

In August 1950, the battalion was ordered to Korea, where it joined the 7th Marine Regiment, 1st Marine Division. 2Lt Reem fought with his battalion in the Inchon landing, the capture of Seoul and the advance to the Chosin Reservoir.

The 25-year-old Marine was commanding an infantry platoon near Chinhung-ni, North Korea, on November 6, 1950. He was preparing his men for an assault on an enemy position when the grenade landed among them. Without hesitation, he smothered the grenade's explosion with his own body to save the rest of the group from death or serious injury. For this action, he was awarded the Medal of Honor.

The Medal of Honor was presented to his widow by Secretary of the Navy Dan A. Kimball in ceremonies on February 8, 1952, in Washington, D.C.

He initially was buried in the United Nations Cemetery near Hamhung, North Korea. His body was later returned to the United States for burial in Arlington National Cemetery, Arlington, Virginia.

As of 2010, he was the only NAPS graduate and, along with Baldomero Lopez, the latest graduates of the Naval Academy to receive a Medal of Honor. (Admiral Stockdale received one for Vietnam War service, but was a 1946 graduate.) Reem is memorialized at the US Naval Academy with a special dormitory room, the Reem room, with brass plaque.

== Medal of Honor citation ==
The President of the United States takes pride in presenting the MEDAL OF HONOR posthumously to

SECOND LIEUTENANT ROBERT D. REEM
UNITED STATES MARINE CORPS

for service as set forth in the following CITATION:

For conspicuous gallantry and intrepidity at the risk of his life above and beyond the call of duty as Platoon Commander in Company H, Third Battalion, Seventh Marine Regiment, First Marine Division (Reinforced), in action against enemy aggressor forces in the vicinity of Chinhung-ni, Korea, on November 6, 1950. Grimly determined to dislodge a group of heavy enemy infantry units occupying well-concealed and strongly fortified positions on commanding ground overlooking unprotected terrain, Second Lieutenant Reem moved slowly forward up the side of the ridge with his platoon in the face of a veritable hail of shattering hostile machine-gun, grenade and rifle fire. Three times repulsed by a resolute enemy force in achieving his objective, and pinned down by the continuing fury of hostile fire, he rallied and regrouped the heroic men in his depleted and disorganized platoon in preparation for a fourth attack. Issuing last-minute orders to his non-commissioned officers when an enemy grenade landed in a depression of rocky ground in which the group was standing, Second Lieutenant Reem unhesitatingly chose to sacrifice himself and, springing upon the deadly missile, absorbed the full impact of the explosion in his own body, thus protecting others from serious injury and possible death. Stout-hearted and indomitable, he readily yielded his own chance of survival so that his subordinate leaders might live. His decisiveness and valiant spirit of self-sacrifice in the face of certain death reflect the highest credit upon Second Lieutenant Reem and the United States Naval Service. He gallantly gave his life for his country.

/S/HARRY S. TRUMAN

== Awards and Decorations ==
2LT Reem's awards include:

1st row	Medal of Honor		Purple Heart
2nd row	Combat Action Ribbon Retroactively Awarded, 1999	Navy Presidential Unit Citation with 1 Service star	American Campaign Medal
3rd row	World War II Victory Medal	National Defense Service Medal	Korean Service Medal with 2 Campaign stars
4th row	Korean Presidential Unit Citation	United Nations Service Medal Korea	Korean War Service Medal Retroactively Awarded, 2003

== See also ==
- List of Medal of Honor recipients
- List of Korean War Medal of Honor recipients
