= William G. Windrich =

United States Marine Corps Medal of Honor recipient

William Gordon Windrich
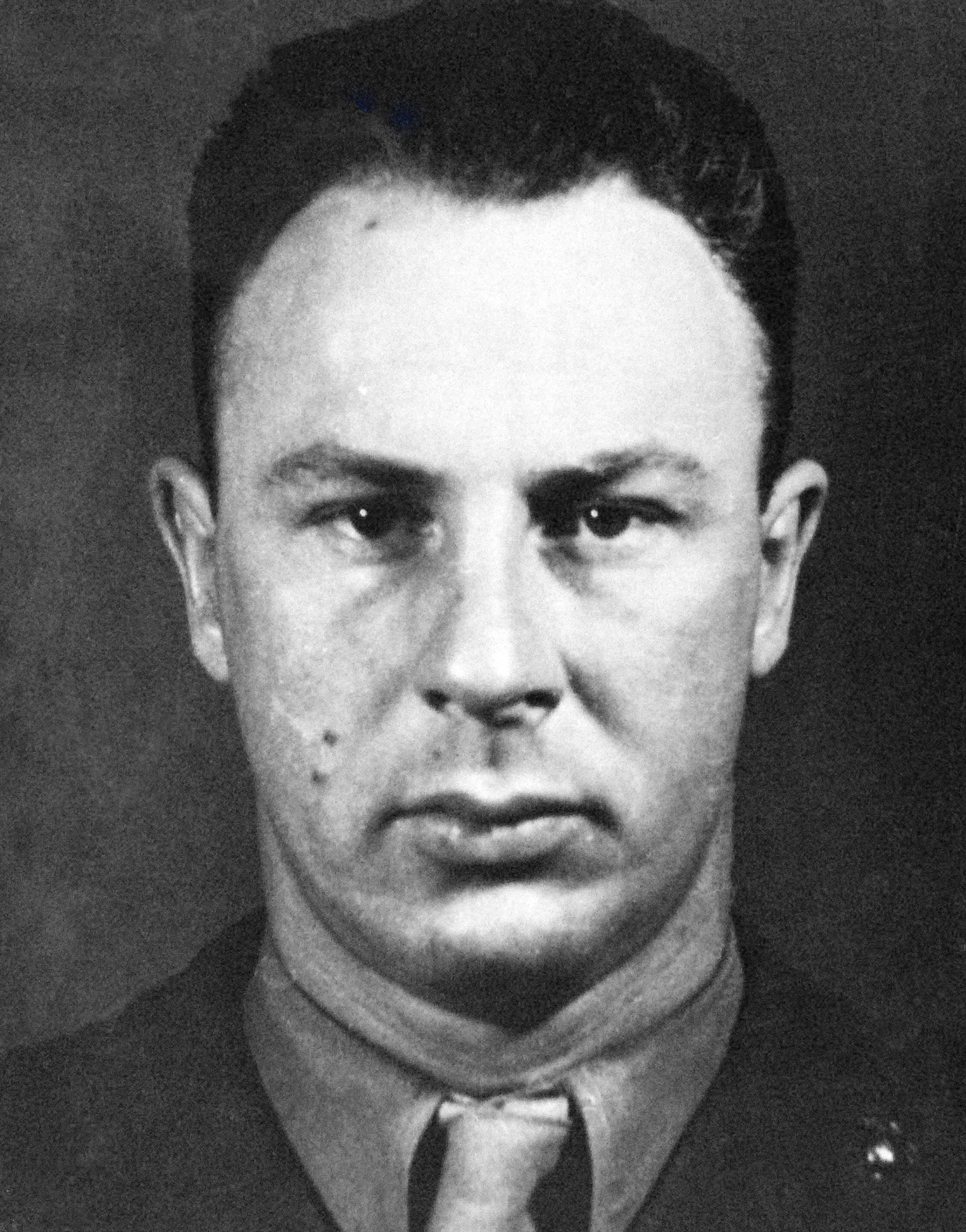
- Medal of Honor recipient William G. Windrich
- Born: May 14, 1921; Chicago, Illinois
- Died: December 2, 1950 (aged 29) near Yudam-ni, Chosin Reservoir, North Korea
- Burial place: Arlington National Cemetery
- Military career
- Allegiance: United States of America
- Branch: United States Marine Corps
- Service years: 1938–1945, 1946–1950
- Rank: Staff Sergeant
- Nickname: "Windy" Bill
- Units: Company I, 3rd Battalion, 5th Marines, 1st Marine Division
- Conflicts: World War II; Battle of Tarawa; Korean War; Battle of Inchon; Second Battle of Seoul; Battle of Chosin Reservoir †
- Awards: Medal of Honor; Purple Heart Medal (2); Combat Action Ribbon

Staff Sergeant William Gordon Windrich (May 14, 1921 – December 2, 1950) was a United States Marine who was awarded the Medal of Honor posthumously for outstanding heroism as a platoon sergeant in the Battle of Chosin Reservoir during the Korean War.

Staff Sergeant Windrich was killed in action the early morning of December 2, 1950 near Yudam-ni, North Korea, during a savage night battle with Chinese forces on Hill 1520. He had refused to be evacuated after being wounded twice, once when a grenade fragment ripped through his helmet. Later felled by gunshot wounds in the legs, he directed his men in setting up defensive positions and shouted words of encouragement until he succumbed to his wounds and the bitter cold. He was carried down from the hill and was buried. He is now buried at Arlington National Cemetery in Arlington, Virginia.

The Medal of Honor, the United States' highest award for valor in combat, was presented to his widow by Secretary of the Navy Daniel A. Kimball during ceremonies on February 8, 1952, in Washington, D.C.

== Biography ==
William Windrich was born on May 14, 1921, in Chicago, Illinois. He attended public schools in Hammond, Indiana.

=== US Marine Corps ===
He enlisted at seventeen in the Marine Corps Reserve on June 6, 1938, and was ordered to active duty in November 1940.

==== World War II ====
During World War II, he spent 20 months overseas in the South and Central Pacific as a machine gunner with the 2nd and 5th Defense Battalions and was on Tarawa. Discharged in November 1945, he reenlisted in the regular Marine Corps the following February.

==== Post-war years ====
In the summer of 1946, he participated in the atomic bomb tests at Bikini Atoll while serving aboard the USS Mount McKinley. After World War II, he served as a non-commissioned officer of the guard in Washington, D.C., at the Naval Gun Factory and at Marine Corps Headquarters, and in China.

==== Korean War ====
At the outbreak of the Korean War, SSgt. Windrich was on military police duty at Camp Pendleton, California. He went overseas with the 1st Provisional Marine Brigade and was among the first Marines to see action in Korea. He participated in the Inchon landing and in the capture of Seoul. It was during the Chosin Reservoir Campaign while now serving as a rifle platoon sergeant with Company I, 3rd Battalion, 5th Marines, after the 1st Marine Division regrouped for its famous breakout to the sea, that he met his heroic death. His body was identified and was returned to the United States in 1955 for burial in Arlington National Cemetery.

== Medal of Honor Citation ==
SSgt. Windrich's Medal of Honor citation reads:

The President of the United States in the name of The Congress takes pride in presenting the MEDAL OF HONOR posthumously to

STAFF SERGEANT WILLIAM G. WINDRICH
UNITED STATES MARINE CORPS

for service as set forth in the following CITATION:

For conspicuous gallantry and intrepidity at the risk of his life above and beyond the call of duty as Platoon Sergeant of Company I, Third Battalion, Fifth Marines, First Marine Division (Reinforced), in action against enemy aggressor forces in the vicinity of Yudam-ni, Korea, the night of 1 December 1950. Promptly organizing a squad of men when the enemy launched a sudden, vicious counterattack against the forward elements of his company's position, rendering it untenable, Staff Sergeant WINDRICH, armed with a carbine, spearheaded the assault to the top of the knoll immediately confronting the overwhelming force and, under shattering hostile automatic weapons, mortar and grenade fire, directed effective fire to hold back the attackers and cover the withdrawal of our troops to commanding ground. With seven of his men struck down during the furious action and he, himself, wounded in the head by a bursting grenade, he made his way to his company's position and, organizing a small group of volunteers, returned with them to evacuate the wounded and dying from the frozen hillside, staunchly refusing medical attention himself. Immediately redeploying the remainder of his troops, Staff Sergeant WINDRICH placed them on the left flank of the defensive sector before the enemy again attacked in force. Wounded in the leg during the bitter fight that followed, he bravely fought on with his men, shouting words of encouragement and directing their fire until the attack was repelled. Refusing evacuation although unable to stand, he still continued to direct his platoon in setting up defensive positions until, weakened by the bitter cold, excessive loss of blood and severe pain, he lapsed into unconsciousness and died. His valiant leadership, fortitude and courageous fighting spirit against tremendous odds served to inspire others to heroic endeavor in holding the objective and reflect the highest credit upon Staff Sergeant WINDRICH and the United States Naval Service. He gallantly gave his life for his country.

/S/ HARRY S. TRUMAN

== Awards and Decorations ==

1st row	Medal of Honor	Purple Heart with 5/16 inch star	Combat Action Ribbon with 5/16 inch star
2nd row	Navy Presidential Unit Citation with 2 Service stars	Marine Corps Good Conduct Medal with 1 Service star	China Service Medal
3rd row	American Defense Service Medal with 'Foreign Service' Clasp	American Campaign Medal	Asiatic-Pacific Campaign Medal with 1 Campaign star
4th row	World War II Victory Medal	National Defense Service Medal	Korean Service Medal with 4 Campaign stars
5th row	Korean Presidential Unit Citation	United Nations Service Medal Korea	Korean War Service Medal Retroactively Awarded, 2003

== See also ==
- List of Medal of Honor recipients
- List of Korean War Medal of Honor recipients
