= Alpha Chi Omega =

American collegiate women's fraternity

- ΑΧΩ
- Founded: October 15, 1885; 141 years ago DePauw University
- Type: Social
- Affiliation: NPC
- Status: Active
- Scope: International
- Motto: "Together let us seek the heights"
- Slogan: Real. Strong. Women.
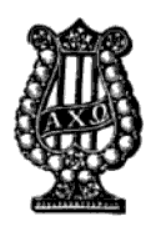
- Member badge
- Colors: Scarlet red and Olive green
- Symbol: Golden lyre
- Flower: Red carnation
- Tree: Holly
- Jewel: Pearl
- Patron Greek deity: Hera
- Publication: The Lyre
- Philanthropy: Domestic Violence Awareness
- Chapters: 140+ collegiate, 170+ alumnae
- Members: 300,000+ lifetime
- Headquarters: 5939 Castle Creek Parkway North Drive; Indianapolis, Indiana 46250; United States
- Website: alphachiomega.org

Alpha Chi Omega (ΑΧΩ, also known as Alpha Chi or A Chi O) is a national women's fraternity founded at DePauw University in 1885. It has more than 140 active collegiate and 170 active alumnae chapters in the United States and has initiated more than 1,000,000+ members. Alpha Chi Omega is a member of the National Panhellenic Conference.

== History ==
Alpha chapter at Depauw University, 1885

In the fall of 1885, James Hamilton Howe, the first dean of the Music School at DePauw University in Greencastle, Indiana, invited seven women from the school to a meeting to form a fraternity. Those women were Anna Allen Smith, Olive Burnett Clark, Bertha Deniston Cunningham, Amy DuBois Rieth, Nellie Gamble Childe, Bessie Grooms Keenan, and Estelle Leonard. Alpha Chi Omega was formed on October 15, 1885.

Howe collaborated with James G. Campbell, a Beta Theta Pi, to establish Alpha Chi Omega as a national fraternity. Campbell laid out its first constitution and by-laws. According to this first constitution, "The object of this fraternity is...to attain the highest musical culture and to cultivate those principles that embody true womanhood." On February 26, 1886, the fraternity hosted a musical soiree to introduce itself to the campus community.

In its early years, Alpha Chi Omega was considered to be a professional music society and its members were music majors. Later, the minimum membership requirement became registration in any music course.

In 1889, a national literary fraternity offered to merge with Alpha Chi Omega; however, unlike typical professional fraternities, Alpha Chi never considered admitting members of other fraternities. In 1900, the fraternity added literary qualifications, which led to it being considered a general (social) fraternity by 1905. In 1907, the sorority had initiated 1,000 members at nine chapters.

Alpha Chi Omega joined the National Panhellenic Conference in 1903.

== Symbols ==
Alpha Chi Omega's founders chose Alpha (Α), the first letter of the Greek alphabet because they were forming the first fraternity in the school of music. Since they thought they might also be founding the last such fraternity, Omega (Ω) seemed appropriate, considering it stands for the end. "Kai" (και), meaning "and", was added to form "the beginning and the end". "Kai" was soon changed to Chi (Χ), a letter of the Greek alphabet which has the same English pronunciation.

Alpha Chi Omega's colors, scarlet red and olive green, were chosen to commemorate the fraternity's fall founding. Its flower is a red carnation, which exemplifies the fraternity's colors, and its tree is the holly. Its patron Greek divinity is Hera.

Alpha Chi Omega chose the three-stringed lyre as its official symbol since it was the first instrument played by the Greek gods on Mount Olympus. The badge (pin) worn by initiated members is in the shape of a lyre, typically featuring pearls and the Greek letters ΑΧΩ on the crossbar. It may also feature diamonds. Although Alpha Chi Omega is no longer strictly a musical fraternity, it is still connected to its musical heritage through the symbol of the lyre, and the name of its publication is The Lyre.

The new member badge (pin) worn by uninitiated members is a lozenge emblazoned with the symbol of a lyre and the sorority's colors of scarlet red on the upper half and olive green on the lower half.

The founders of Alpha Chi Omega

== Activities ==
Members of Alpha Chi Omega have several national programs.

- Founders' Day – Sisters gather on October 15 of each year to recognize the fraternity's fall founding at DePauw University in Greencastle, Indiana. Members wear their badges, along with scarlet and olive green ribbons.
- MacDowell Month – Every February, Alpha Chi Omega women celebrate the fine arts and their fine arts heritage. Most collegiate chapters encourage members to attend and perform in fine art events during this month. This celebration was named for the MacDowell artists' colony in New Hampshire, the fraternity's first philanthropic effort.
- Local Founding Days – Each collegiate chapter recognizes its founding anniversary annually.
- National Convention – Members gather every two years to conduct fraternity business, reunite with sisters, and celebrate the fraternity.
- Hera Day – Sisters honor the fraternity's patron goddess Hera by dedicating themselves on March 1 of each year to aid the happiness and overall well-being of others through volunteering and fundraising for domestic violence shelters in their communities.

== Philanthropy ==
=== Beginnings of philanthropy ===
In 1911, Alpha Chi Omega began supporting the MacDowell Colony, founded by Marian MacDowell, an Alpha Chi Omega alumna. During World War I and World War II, the fraternity helped orphaned French children and provided day nurseries for working mothers married to servicemen. In 1947, Alpha Chi Omega adopted Easter Seals as its national philanthropy and supported other projects associated with cerebral palsy.

=== National philanthropy ===
In 1992, the fraternity adopted supporting victims of domestic violence as its primary national philanthropy. As of 2018, Alpha Chi Omega is partnered with Mary Kay, The Allstate Foundation's Purple Purse, The One Love Foundation, RAINN, and It's On Us. The fraternity also supports Kristin's Story in cooperation with Delta Delta Delta, a nonprofit set up by the Delta Delta Delta mother of an Alpha Chi Omega member who died by suicide after a sexual assault.

Undergraduate and alumnae chapters focus on increasing awareness of domestic violence and its effects and on aiding domestic violence victims through activities, service projects, and financial support. This work is done through local agencies, such as rape crisis centers, emergency shelters, and safe houses for domestic violence victims and their children, and long-term assistance centers for battered women in the United States.

=== Foundation ===
In 1978, the fraternity created the Alpha Chi Omega Foundation, a nonprofit organization to oversee funds for its philanthropic projects and educational programming. The foundation continues to grant funds to the fraternity's former partners, the MacDowell Colony and Easter Seals. It supports members and those closely related to Alpha Chi Omegas through various grants.

== Membership ==
The fraternity has initiated more than 300,000 members to its collegiate and alumnae chapters since 1885.

== Chapters ==
Alpha Chi Omega has chartered more than 194 chapters at colleges and universities and 279 alumnae chapters in the U.S. Alumnae chapters allow women of post-graduate age to continue Alpha Chi Omega's mission and values. Collegiate chapters work with alumnae chapters to link sisters across the country. As of 2023, there are 140 active collegiate and 170 active alumnae chapters.

== See also ==
- List of social sororities and women's fraternities
