= George H. Ramer =

United States Marine Corps Medal of Honor recipient

George Henry Ramer
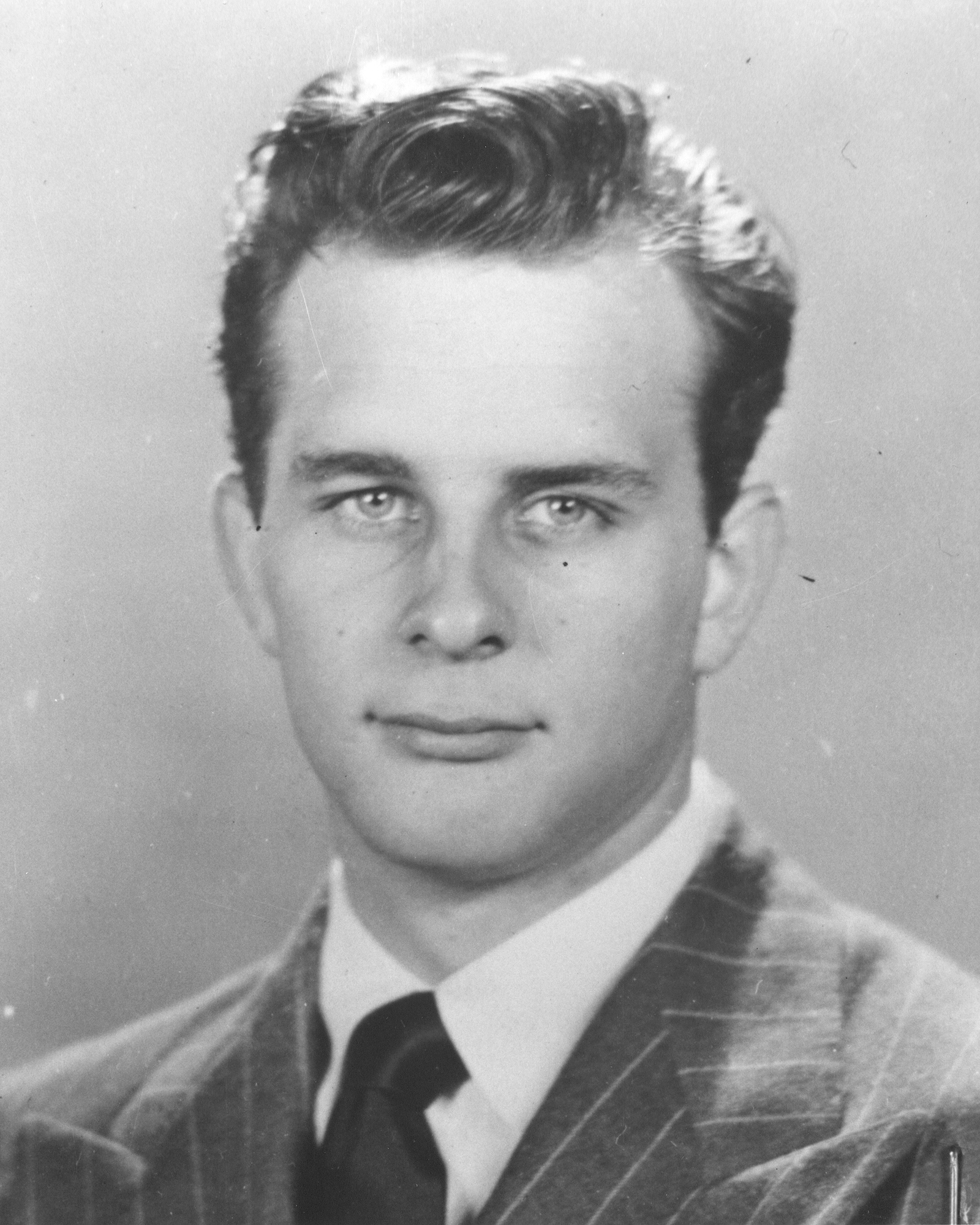
- George H. Ramer, Medal of Honor recipient
- Born: March 27, 1927; Meyersdale, Pennsylvania
- Died: September 12, 1951 (aged 24); Punchbowl, Korea
- Burial place: Lewisburg Cemetery, Lewisburg, Pennsylvania
- Military career
- Allegiance: United States of America
- Branch: United States Navy; United States Marine Corps
- Service years: 1944–1946 (USN); 1950–1951 (USMC)
- Rank: Second lieutenant
- Unit: 3rd Battalion, 7th Marines
- Conflicts: World War II; Korean War: Battle of the Punchbowl †
- Awards: Medal of Honor; Purple Heart

Second Lieutenant George Henry Ramer (March 27, 1927 – September 12, 1951) was a United States Marine Corps officer who posthumously received the Medal of Honor – the United States' highest military decoration for heroism – for his actions in Korea on September 12, 1951, when he sacrificed his life during a fearless attack on an enemy position during the Battle of the Punchbowl. He was the 27th Marine to receive the Medal of Honor for heroism during the Korean War.

Second Lieutenant Ramer, who had been an enlisted U.S. Navy sailor during World War II, was cited after leading an attack by the third platoon of Company I, 3rd Battalion, 7th Marines, 1st Marine Division. Although he and most of his men were wounded while fighting their way through vicious machine-gun, mortar and small-arms fire, he continued to lead the assault on the enemy-held hilltop, personally destroying an enemy bunker and directing his capture of the position.

When the enemy immediately began an overwhelming counter-attack, he ordered his men to withdraw and fought single-handedly to cover the withdrawal and the evacuation of three fatally wounded Marines. Wounded a second time, he refused aid, ordered his men to shelter and continued to fight until he was fatally wounded as the enemy overran his position.

== Biography ==
George Henry Ramer was born on March 27, 1927, in Meyersdale, Pennsylvania. He attended elementary school in Salisbury, Pennsylvania, and graduated from Lewisburg High School in 1944 in Lewisburg, Pennsylvania. He enlisted in the navy on August 11, 1944, and served until June 5, 1946.

Upon his return to civilian life, he entered Bucknell University, where he was a member of the Phi Gamma Delta fraternity. He graduated in February 1950, with a bachelor's degree in political science and history. While attending college, he enrolled in the Marine Corps Reserve Platoon Leader's program, completing summer training courses at Quantico, Virginia, in 1947 and 1948. He was commissioned in the Marine Corps Reserve in 1950 and taught high school civics, history and problems of democracy in Lewisburg, Pennsylvania, before he was called to active duty at his own request on January 3, 1951.

Completing the Basic Course at Quantico, Virginia, in April 1951, 2ndLt Ramer embarked the following month for Korea. Before his death he saw action in the campaigns against the Chinese Communist Spring Offensive and in the United Nations Summer-Fall Offensive.

His remains were returned to the United States in December 1951 and interred in Lewisburg Cemetery, Lewisburg, Pennsylvania.

The Medal of Honor was presented to his widow on January 7, 1953, by Secretary of the Navy Daniel A. Kimball in Washington, D.C.

== Medal of Honor citation ==
The President of the United States takes pride in presenting the MEDAL OF HONOR posthumously to

SECOND LIEUTENANT GEORGE H. RAMER
UNITED STATES MARINE CORPS RESERVE

for service as set forth in the following CITATION:

For conspicuous gallantry and intrepidity at the risk of his life above and beyond the call of duty as Leader of the Third Platoon in Company I, Third Battalion, Seventh Marines, First Marine Division (Reinforced) in action against enemy aggressor forces in Korea on 12 September 1951. Ordered to attack and seize hostile positions atop a hill, vigorously defended by well entrenched enemy forces delivering massed small-arms, mortar and machine-gun fire, Second Lieutenant Ramer fearlessly led his men up the steep slopes and, although he and the majority of his unit were wounded during the ascent, boldly continued to spearhead the assault. With the terrain becoming more precipitous near the summit and the climb more perilous as the hostile forces added grenades to the devastating hail of fire, he staunchly carried the attack to the top, personally annihilated one enemy bunker with grenade and carbine fire and captured the objective with his remaining eight men. Unable to hold the position against an immediate, overwhelming hostile counterattack, he ordered his group to withdraw and single-handedly fought the enemy to furnish cover for his men and for the evacuation of three fatally wounded Marines. Severely wounded a second time, Second Lieutenant Ramer refused aid when his men returned to help him and, after ordering them to seek shelter, courageously manned his post until the hostile troops overran his position and he fell mortally wounded. His indomitable fighting spirit, inspiring leadership and unselfish concern for others in the face of death reflect the highest credit upon Second Lieutenant Ramer and the United States Naval Service. He gallantly gave his life for his country.

/S/ HARRY S. TRUMAN

== Awards and decorations ==
Lieutenant Ramer was awarded the following awards for his service

1st row	Medal of Honor		
2nd row	Purple Heart with 5/16 inch star	Combat Action Ribbon Retroactively Awarded, 1999	Navy Presidential Unit Citation with 1 Service star
3rd row	Navy Unit Commendation	American Campaign Medal	European-African-Middle Eastern Campaign Medal with 1 Campaign star
4th row	World War II Victory Medal	National Defense Service Medal	Korean Service Medal with 2 Campaign stars
5th row	Korean Presidential Unit Citation	United Nations Service Medal Korea	Korean War Service Medal Retroactively Awarded, 2003

== In honor ==
Ramer Hall, dedicated to 2ndLt Ramer, is a combat conditioning facility, at The Basic School, Quantico, Virginia, which was opened in 1963.

== See also ==
- List of Medal of Honor recipients
- List of Korean War Medal of Honor recipients
