= Wesley Phelps =

U.S. Marine (1923–1944)

- Born: June 12, 1923; Neafus, Kentucky
- Died: October 4, 1944 (aged 21); Peleliu, Palau Islands
- Burial place: initially the United States Armed Forces Cemetery on Peleliu later reinterred in Rosine Cemetery, Rosine, Kentucky
- Military career
- Allegiance: United States
- Branch: United States Marine Corps
- Service years: 1943–1944
- Rank: Private First Class
- Units: 3rd Battalion, 7th Marines, 1st Marine Division
- Conflicts: World War II; Cape Gloucester campaign; (Battle of Peleliu †
- Awards: Medal of Honor (posthumous); Purple Heart

Wesley P. Phelps (June 12, 1923 – October 4, 1944) was a United States Marine who posthumously received the Medal of Honor for his heroic actions and sacrifice of life during the World War II Battle of Peleliu.

== Biography ==
Wesley P. Phelps was born in Neafus, Kentucky on June 12, 1923. He was educated in the Ohio County, Kentucky, elementary schools and graduated from Horse Branch High School in 1942. Radio was his hobby and he had built some one-tube sets. Deciding to turn his hobby into an occupation, he went to school in Owensboro, Kentucky, for four months where he studied basic electricity, then took a three-month course in radio repair work at the Lafayette Trade School at Lexington, Kentucky. He followed that with studies in field radio repair work, and radio repair work on aircraft receivers at the Johnson Pre-Frequency Modulation School.

Although he was the sole support of his aged parents who owned and operated a 70-acre (280,000 m^{2}) farm with his help, he was called up by the draft and was inducted into the United States Marine Corps on April 9, 1943, in Indianapolis, Indiana.

After boot camp at Marine Corps Recruit Depot San Diego, Pvt Phelps was assigned to the Signal Battalion at the Marine Base at San Diego for one month and then was transferred to the Infantry Training Battalion at Camp Elliot, California. He successfully completed an eight-week course on the Browning Heavy Machine Gun, 30 caliber, and was classified as a heavy machine gunner. Pvt Phelps joined the 27th Replacement Battalion in September and left the United States on October 23, 1943, joining Company M, 3rd Battalion, 7th Marines of the 1st Marine Division in December, just a few days before the unit left for the combat landing on Cape Gloucester, New Britain. After the Cape Gloucester campaign, all machine gun companies in the division, of which Company M was one, were broken up and their personnel were assigned to rifle companies. In this shuffle, Pvt Phelps became a crewman on a light machine gun in Company K of the same battalion. He was promoted to private first class in April 1944.

After a so-called "rest" at Pavuvu Island in the Russell Islands, the 1st Division left for the little-publicized Peleliu Island operation. After nineteen days of bitter and costly fighting, the night of October 4, 1944, found Company K strung out along the military crest of one of the coral mountains for which Peleliu is noted. With the Marines on one slope of the hill and the Japanese on the opposite slope, rifles became useless and a series of hand grenade battles took place over a period of several days. During the night of the fourth the enemy launched a particularly vicious counterattack. PFC Phelps and a fellow Marine were in a foxhole when a Japanese grenade landed with a thud between them.

Private First Class Phelps shouted, "Look out, Shipley!" then unhesitatingly rolled over on the grenade, taking the full force of the explosion with his own body. Phelps was killed while PFC Richard Shipley received only a small scratch.

Private First Class Phelps was initially buried in the United States Armed Forces Cemetery on Peleliu, but was later reinterred in Rosine Cemetery, Rosine, Kentucky.

The Medal of Honor was presented to his mother in Rosine, Kentucky, on April 26, 1946, by the Commanding Officer of the Naval Ordnance Plant at Louisville, Kentucky.

== Medal of Honor citation ==
The President of the United States takes pride in presenting the MEDAL OF HONOR posthumously to

PRIVATE FIRST CLASS WESLEY PHELPS
UNITED STATES MARINE CORPS RESERVE

for service as set forth in the following CITATION:

For conspicuous gallantry and intrepidity at the risk of his life above and beyond the call of duty while serving with the Third Battalion, Seventh Marines, First Marine Division, in action against enemy Japanese forces on Peleliu Island, Palau Group, during a savage hostile counterattack on the night of October 4, 1944. Stationed with another Marine in an advanced position when a Japanese hand grenade landed in his foxhole, Private First Class Phelps instantly shouted a warning to his comrade and rolled over on the deadly bomb, absorbing with his own Body the full, shattering impact of the exploding charge. Courageous and indomitable, Private First Class Phelps fearlessly gave his life that another might be spared serious injury and his great valor and heroic devotion to duty in the face of certain death reflected the highest credit upon himself and the United States Naval Service. He gallantly gave his life for his country.

/S/ HARRY S. TRUMAN

== Awards and Decorations ==
PFC Phelps received the following awards during his service

1st row	Medal of Honor		
2nd row	Purple Heart	Combat Action Ribbon	Presidential Unit Citation
3rd row	American Campaign Medal	Asiatic-Pacific Campaign Medal with 1 Campaign star	World War II Victory Medal

== See also ==
- List of Medal of Honor recipients
- List of Medal of Honor recipients for World War II
