= 3rd Battalion, 7th Marines =

US Marine Corps unit

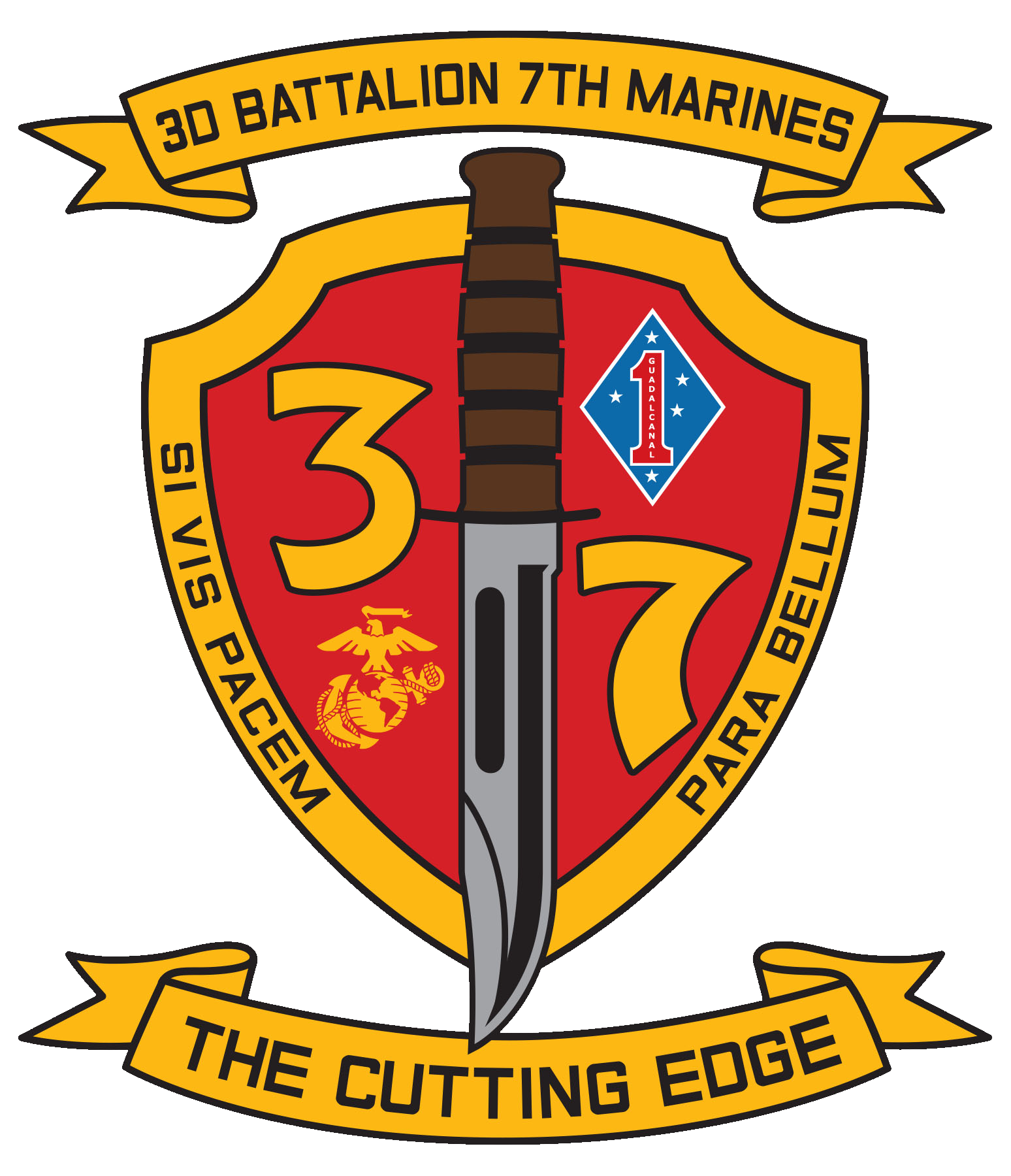
3rd Battalion, 7th Marine Regiment 3rd Battalion, 7th Marines modern insignia, current 2018-present.
- Active: 1 January 1941 – present
- Country: United States of America
- Branch: United States Marine Corps
- Type: Infantry
- Size: 1,200
- Part of: 7th Marine Regiment; 1st Marine Division
- Garrison/HQ: Marine Corps Air Ground Combat Center Twentynine Palms
- Engagements: World War II: Battle of Guadalcanal; Battle of Cape Gloucester; Battle of Peleliu; Battle of Okinawa; Korean War: Battle of Inchon; Second Battle of Seoul; Battle of Chosin Reservoir; Battle of Hwacheon; Battle of the Punchbowl; Battle of Bunker Hill (1952); First Battle of the Hook; Battle for Outpost Vegas; Battle of the Samichon River; Vietnam War: Operation Starlite; Operation Desert Storm; Operation United Shield; War on terror: Operation Iraqi Freedom; 2003 invasion of Iraq; Operation Enduring Freedom; Operation Inherent Resolve

Commanders
- Commanding Officer: Lieutenant Colonel Benjamin O’Donnell
- Senior Enlisted: Sergeant Major Tony Johnson
- Notable commanders: Edward H. Hurst

The 3rd Battalion 7th Marine Regiment (3/7, V37) is an infantry battalion of the United States Marine Corps. They are based at the Marine Corps Air Ground Combat Center Twentynine Palms and consist of approximately 800 Marines. The battalion falls under the command of the 7th Marine Regiment and the 1st Marine Division. The battalion has seen combat in World War II, the Korean War, the Vietnam War, the Gulf War and was a part of the main effort during the initial invasion of Iraq in 2003. During the Global War on Terror, the battalion saw eleven sequential combat deployments; five in support of Operation Iraqi Freedom, three in support of Operation Enduring Freedom, and three in support Operation Inherent Resolve.

== Subordinate units ==
- Headquarters and Service Company
- Company I (India Company)
- Company K (Kilo Company)
- Company L (Lima Company)
- Weapons Company

Historical Contingency Company:

- Company M (Mike Company)

== History ==
=== World War II ===
3rd Battalion 7th Marines was activated 1 January 1941 at Guantanamo Bay, Cuba and was assigned to the 1st Marine Brigade. In February 1941 they were reassigned to the 1st Marine Division.

Due to the situation in the Pacific, the 7th Marines were detached from the 1st Marine Division and sent to American Samoa with the Third Battalion being the first to arrive on 28 April 1942. Companies I and M landed at Wallis Island on 27 March 1942 along with Free French forces to deny the Island to Vichy France.

3/7 participated in the following World War II campaigns:

- Guadalcanal.
- New Britain.
- Peleliu.
- Okinawa.

After the war 3/7 participated in Operation Beleaguer in northern China from September 1945 to April 1946 and then deactivated 15 April 1946.

=== Korean War ===
The battalion was reactivated 11 September 1950 at Kobe, Japan and assigned to the 1st Marine Division. They deployed in September 1950 to the South Korea and participated in the Inchon-Seoul. Following the recapture of Seoul, the 1st Marine Division was pulled out of northwest Korea and sailed to the east coast where they landed at Wonsan in late October and began to march north towards the Yalu River.

The battalion was in Yudam-ni on the evening of 27–28 November 1950 when the Battle of Chosin Reservoir began. On the first evening, the Marines of "How Company" were overwhelmed on Hill 1403 by waves of Chinese attackers and were eventually ordered to pull back by the commanding officer (CO), Lieutenant Colonel William Harris The battalion continued to fight on the hills around Yudam-ni for the next few days until 1 December when the 5th Marines and 7th Marines were ordered to fight their way back to the 1st Marine Division's main perimeter at Hagaru-ri. The 300+ remaining members of 3/7 provided the rearguard for the two regiments as they broke out to Hagaru-ri and were the last Marines to leave the perimeter at Yudam-ni as it was being overrun by Chinese forces 3/7 consolidated with the rest of the division at Hagaru-ri and took part in the fighting breakout towards Koto-ri where, on 7 December, all of the 1st Marine Division's regiments were together for the first time since the landing at Wonsan in October Of note during the battle, on the morning before their arrival at the Koto-ri perimeter, the battalion's CO, who during the battle was described as "coming apart" and having an "emotional breakdown and collapse", disappeared and was never seen again. After the withdrawal from Chosin the 1st Marine Division was evacuated from Hungnam.

During the rest of the war 3/7 took part in the fighting on the East Central Front and then the Western Front of the Jamestown Line. In October 1951 it performed the first battalion sized combat helicopter air assault in history in Operation Bumblebee. After the war the battalion participated in the defense of the Korean Demilitarized Zone, July 1953 to March 1955.

=== Vietnam War ===
The 3rd Battalion, along with the rest of the 7th Marines, was deployed to Vietnam from Camp Pendleton in late May 1965. The 3/7, under the command of LTC Charles H. Bodley, embarked on the amphibious ships USS Iwo Jima, USS Talladega, and USS Point Defiance at Okinawa on 24–26 June and landed near the city of Qui Nhon on 1 July 1965.

On 18 August 1965, the 3/7 took part in Operation Starlite, the first regimental size operation by US forces since the Korean War. The 3/7, along with the 3rd Battalion, 3rd Marines, and the 2nd Battalion, 4th Marines, made a combined amphibious-helicopter assault on fortified enemy positions on the Van Tuong Peninsula. The Marines landed behind enemy lines and, after seven days of fighting, drove the Viet Cong (VC) 1st Regiment into the sea.

In January 1966, the 3/7 took part in Operation Mallard along with the 3rd Battalion, 3rd Marines. It was a sweep of the area 20 miles southwest of Da Nang, in the area later known as the Arizona Territory. While the VC did not engage in major confrontations with the Marines during Operation Mallard, the area would later be a significant battleground for the 3/7 and other Marine battalions in the years to come.

In March 1966 the battalion took part in Operation Texas. On 18 March 1966 an Army of the Republic of Vietnam (ARVN) outpost on Hill 141 west of Quang Ngai City was overrun by the People's Army of Vietnam (PAVN) 36th Regiment. A reaction/relief force was promptly put together consisting of elements from 4 Marine battalions including 3/7 and an ARVN battalion. The allied forces were inserted by ground and air on 20 and 21 March and began closing around the PAVN forces. Over the next four days, Operation Texas claimed a total of 623 known PAVN dead, but at least 57 US Marines and sailors were killed in a series of bitter fights.

Along with the 1/7, 2/7 and elements of the 26th Marines and 51st ARVN regiment, the 3/7th also took part in Operation Oklahoma Hills from March through May 1969, an operation to clear PAVN base camps and infiltration routes out of the hills and valleys southwest of Da Nang, South Vietnam's second most important city and a major base for US operations at the time.

For "conspicuous gallantry and intrepity at the risk of his life above and beyond the call of duty" and "in the face of vicious enemy fire" during a search and destroy mission in the Que Son-Hiep Duc Valley on 28 August 1969, in which he destroyed several of the enemy and silenced anti-aircraft guns and machinegunist, Lance Corporal Jose F. Jimenez of Kilo Company, 3/7, was posthumously awarded the Medal of Honor.

=== Persian Gulf War ===
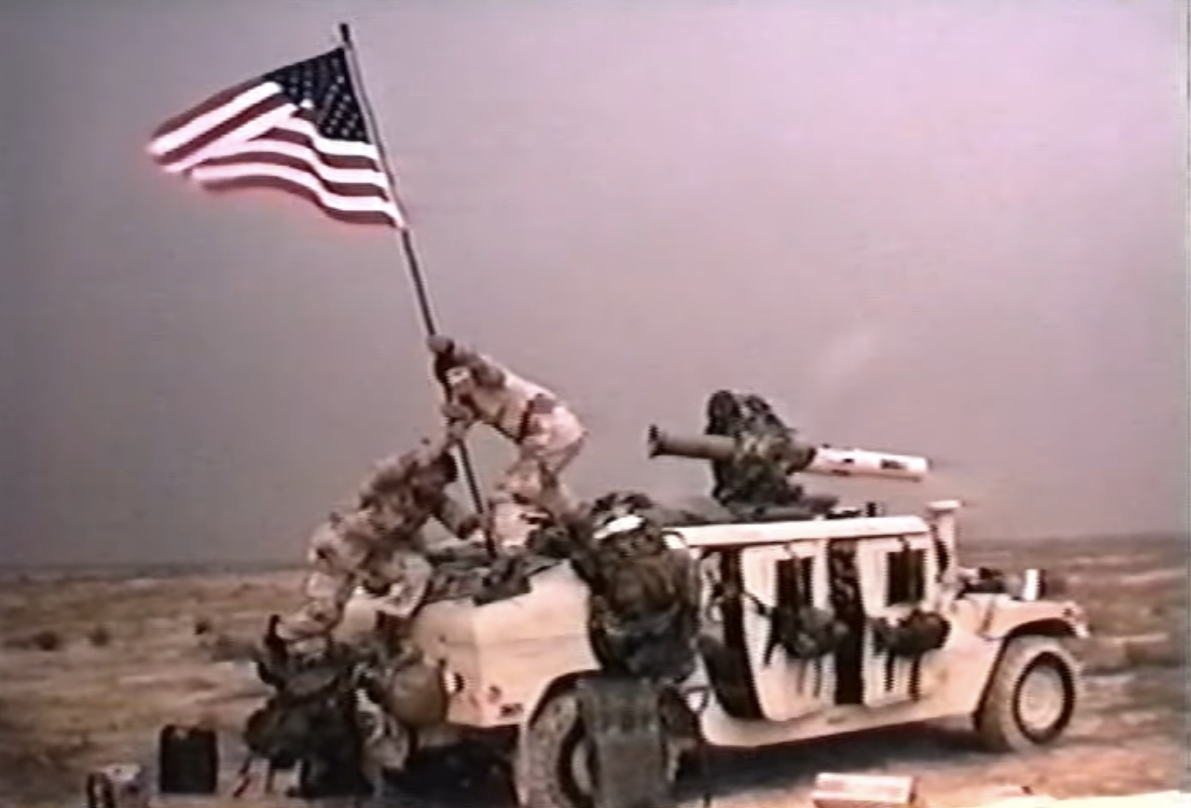
3/7 Marines as part of Task Force Grizzly raising Old Glory on their Humvee during combat operations.

During the 1990–91 Persian Gulf War, 3/7 took part in Operation Desert Storm. The battalion arrived in Jubail, Saudi Arabia, in mid-January 1991, with the mission to be a foot-mobile infiltration force. For a month from mid-February onwards, 3/7—as part of Task Force Grizzly, which mainly consisted of 3/7 and 2nd Battalion 7th Marines—took up position along a berm near the Saudi–Kuwaiti border. There, 3/7 became the lead element of all U.S. forces in the region. The battalion moved out of Saudi Arabia and into Kuwait three days before the ground offensive began on 24 February, and then became the first allied infantry force to enter Kuwait. After breaching two enemy minefields, 3/7 took over Ahmad al-Jaber Air Base, which was believed to be the main command post for all enemy forces in Kuwait. The battalion departed Saudi Arabia in early March.

=== Somali Civil War ===
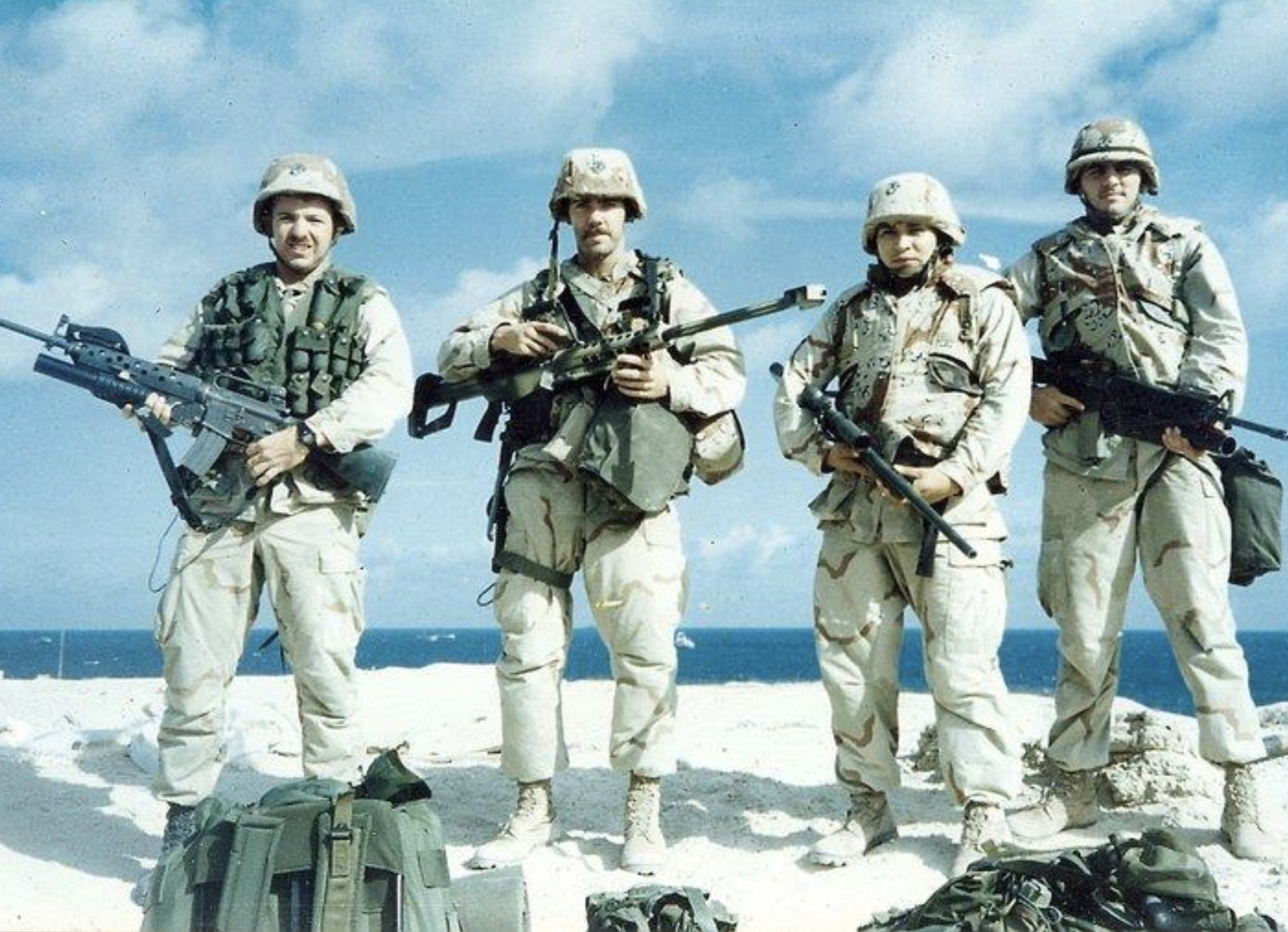
A Scout-Sniper Team from the 3rd Bn, 7th Marines, attached to the 13th MEU (BLT 3/1) prepares to depart Mogadishu, Somalia during Operation UNITED SHIELD in 1995. Photo: CWO-5/Marine Gunner Christian P. Wade USMC (Ret.), second from left..

From January to March 1995, elements of the battalion—namely Kilo Company, augmented with elements from India Company, Lima Company, and Weapons Company—participated in Peacetime Enforcement Operation, Operation United Shield in Somalia. The operation was the closing chapter of United Nations Operation in Somalia II (UNOSOM II). A Combined Task Force (CTF), commanded by the United States, including two ships of the Pakistan Navy, two ships of the Italian Navy and six ships of the United States Navy evacuated all UN Peacekeeping Forces from Somalia.

On 27 February 1995, minutes before midnight, 3/7 executed an amphibious assault on the city of Mogadishu, part of a mechanized force consisting of about 1,800 US Marines and 350 Italian Marines. Aboard LCUs LAVs, AAVs, and LCACs the joint task force secured Mogadishu International Airport and New Port. The entire amphibious landing was complete by 0430 on the morning of 28 February, and evacuation procedures immediately commenced.

By 3 March 1995, 73 hours after the beginning of the amphibious landing, all 2,422 United Nations troops, approximately 3,800 CTF troops and over a hundred combat vehicles had withdrawn without any loss of life among any of the coalition forces.

=== Global war on terror (GWOT) ===
==== Operation Iraqi Freedom ====
2003 - 1st Tour

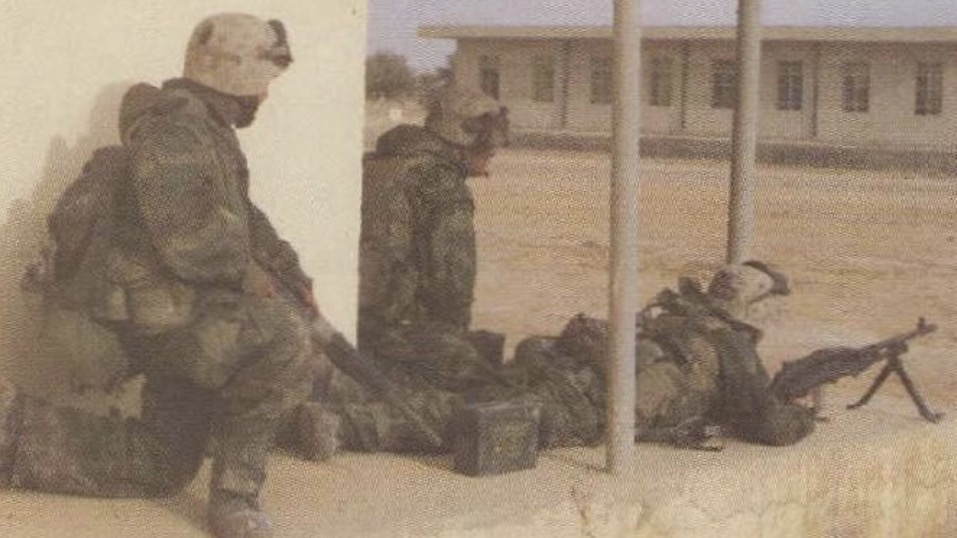
Marines from 3/7 establish firing position inside an Iraqi army camp near An Numaniyah.

3/7 was part of the main effort, and took a major role in the 2003 invasion of Iraq. They originally deployed in January 2003, moved north in March and reached Baghdad by April – securing several cities, military bases, terrorist training facilities, and various other objectives along the way. They then moved south for a five-month security assignment doing stabilizing operations in Karbala until September 2003. During the assignment, India Company, 3rd Battalion 7th Marines operated in Mahmudiyah, Iraq in support of Task Force Scorpion during July and August 2003. India Company's training in the Kuwaiti desert and the subsequent invasion was covered in the TV documentary Virgin Soldiers which often airs on Discovery Times and Military Channel.

2004 - 2nd Tour

After returning to the United States in September 2003, the battalion re-deployed in February 2004 to Al Qaim—in western Al Anbar Province, abutting the Syrian border. Their area of responsibility included Husaybah, the primary border-crossing point between Syria and Iraq. Increased military presence resulted in continuous fighting, including large-scale operations to retake the city of Husaybah from insurgents and local fighters in April. The Medal of Honor was posthumously awarded to Kilo Company squad leader Jason Dunham for actions in the city of Karabilah. They returned from that deployment in September 2004.

2005 - 2006 - 3rd Tour

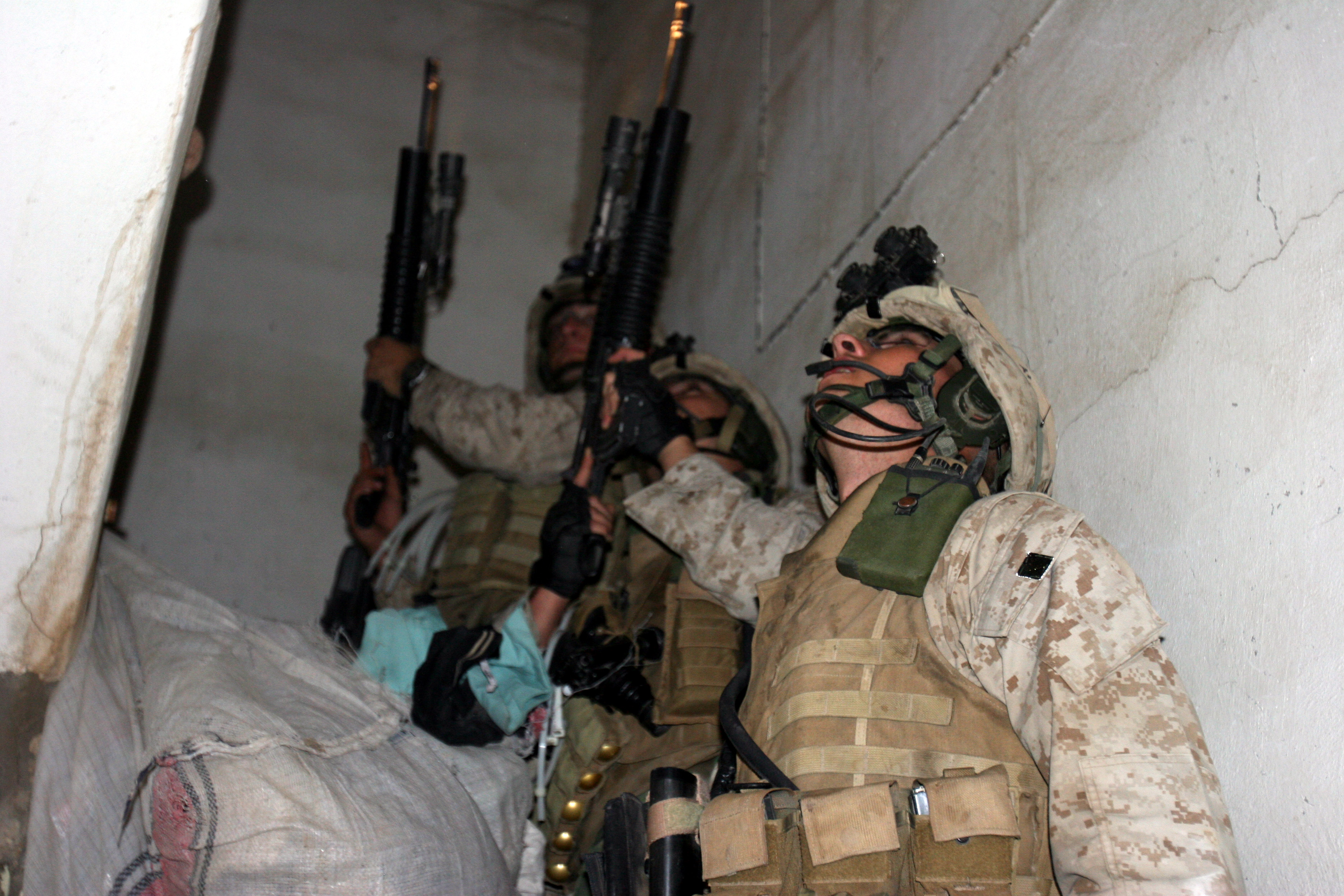
AR RAMADI, Iraq (December 8, 2005) - Marines with 4th Platoon, Company I, 3rd Battalion, 7th Marine Regiment, search a store for hidden illegal weapons during Operation Skinner Dec. 8. Photo by Cpl. Shane Suzuki

From September 2005 to March 2006 3/7 was stationed in Ar Ramadi and made FOB Hurricane Point (HP) and Camp Ramadi their main base of operations; however most infantry units operated out of firm bases and outposts within the city.

2007 - 4th Tour

From May 2007 to November 2007 3/7 was once again stationed in Ar Ramadi and made FOB Hurricane Point (HP) and Camp Ramadi their main base of operations. They dispersed throughout the city to increase contact with the local residents. Since the prevalence of the Anbar Awakening, 3/7 Marines began conducting counter-insurgency (COIN) missions rather than the more "kinetic" operations on previous tours.

2008 - 2009 - 5th Tour

3/7 re-deployed in support of OIF again in August 2008, once again to the Al Qaim area—in western Al Anbar Province, abutting the Syrian border. Due to status of forces agreements with the Iraqi government, operations were very limited and the battalion served in an "operational overwatch" role for the Iraqi forces. They returned from that deployment in March 2009.

==== Operation Enduring Freedom ====
2010 - 6th Tour - Sangin I

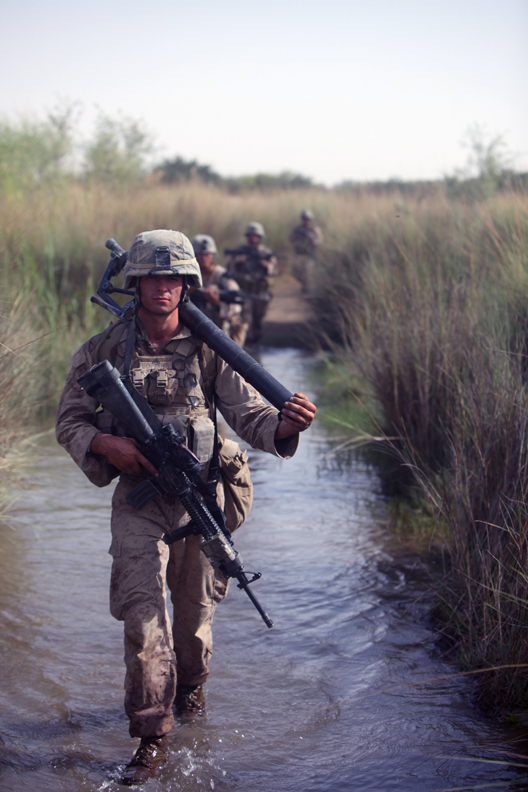
Lance Cpl. Derek Hopkins, a mortarman with Company K, 3rd Battalion, 7th Marine Regiment, carries a mortar tube while walking through a flooded field during a patrol, Aug. 3. Marines with Company K carry their mortar systems

3/7 deployed to Helmand province, Afghanistan from March 2010 to October 2010. During this deployment, the Marines of 3/7 operated in various locations including Musa Qaleh, Marjah, and Sangin.

2011 - 2012 - 7th Tour - Sangin II

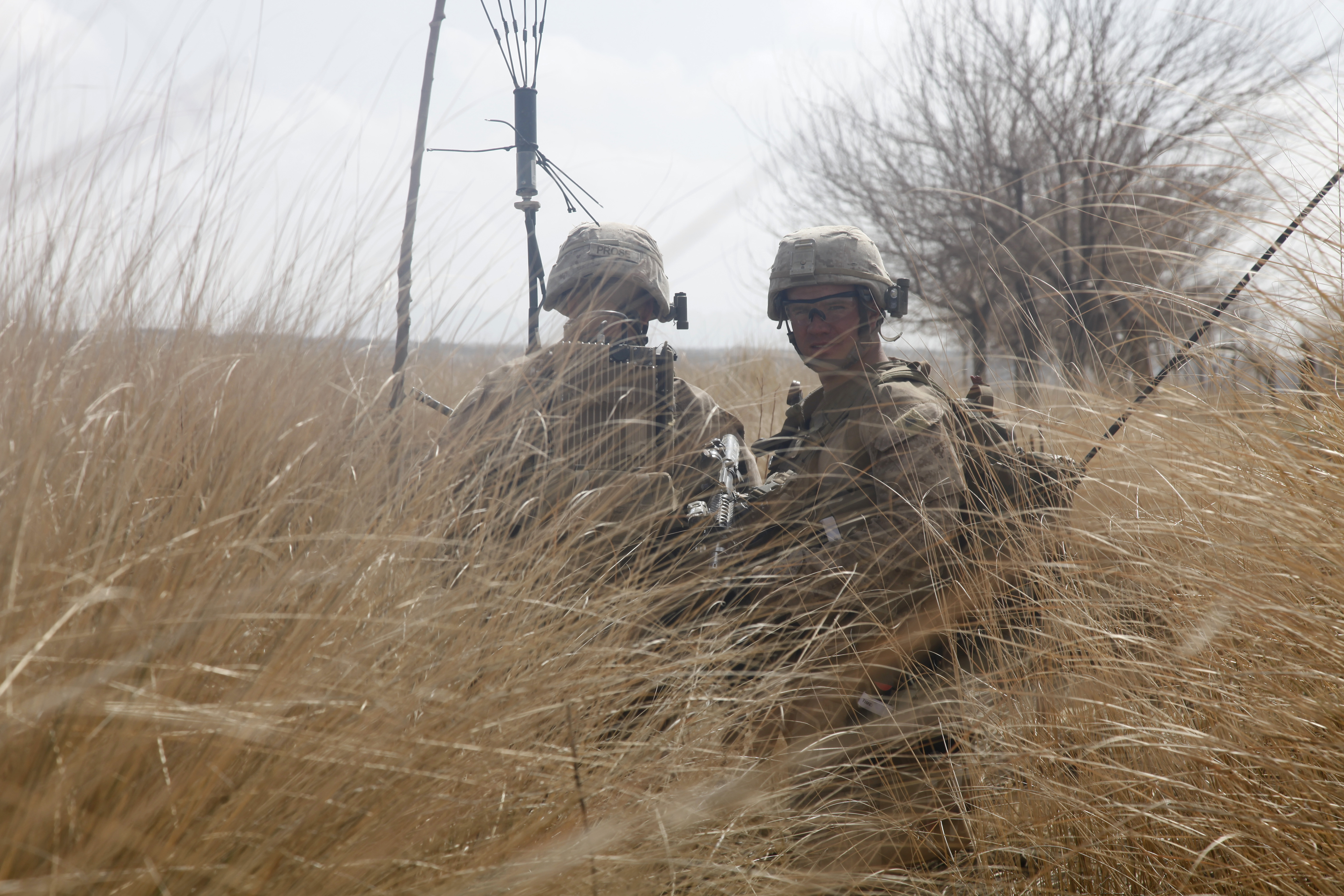
S. Marine Corps Cpl. Gabriel Flaa with Weapons Company, 3rd Battalion, 7th Marine Regiment, Regimental Combat Team 6 scans the horizon during a security patrol in Sangin, Helmand province

In September and October 2011, 3/7 relieved 1/5 and elements of 1/6 in both the "green" and "brown" zones of the Sangin District for a second tour in support of Operation Enduring Freedom. The battalion conducted daily security patrols along with several clearing operations in an environment heavily laced with IED's. The battalion took 9 KIA and returned home in April 2012.

2013 - 2014 - 8th Tour - Sangin III

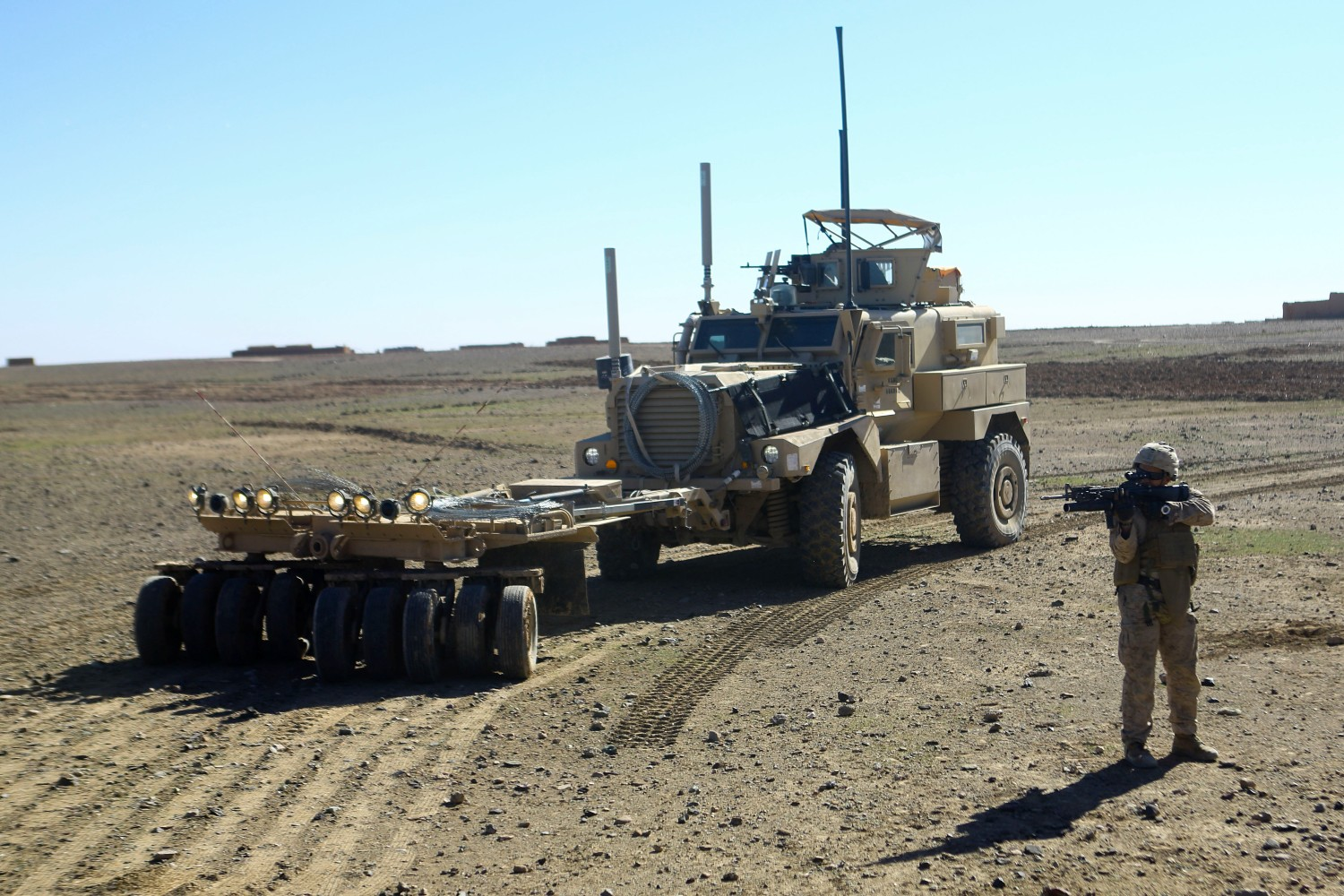
U.S. Marine Corps Lance Cpl. Diamond Aranda, a Rifleman with India Co., 3rd Battalion, 7th Marine Regiment provides security during a downed vehicle recovery in Now Zad district, Helmand province, Afghanistan, supporting Afghan forces 16 Feb. 2014.(U.S. Marine Corps photo by Cpl. Sean Searfus/ Released)

In September 2013, 3/7 returned to Northern Helmand province and relieved 3rd Battalion, 4th Marines, in Afghanistan for a third tour in support of Operation Enduring Freedom. The Battalion conducted distributed operations providing support to the Afghan Security Forces with companies located in Musa Q'ala, Sangin, Kajaki and FOB Shukvani in the Southern Musa Q'ala Wadi.

==== Operation Inherent Resolve / SPMAGTF-CR-CC ====
2015 - 9th Tour

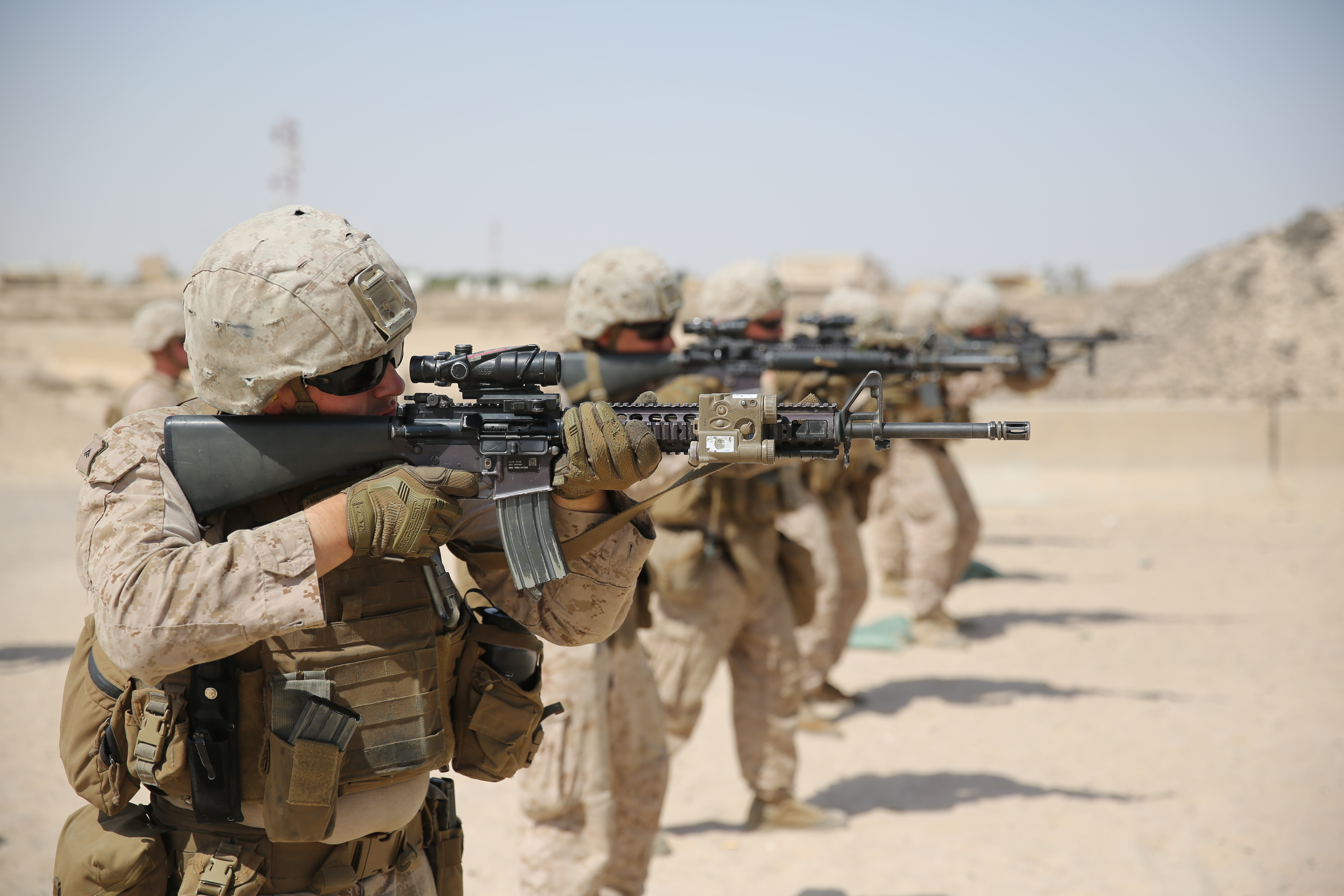
OIR 15.2 - Security Force Marines from the 3rd Battalion, 7th Marine Regiment executing Combat Marskmanship Program Short Range Table 5.

3/7's inaugural Special Purpose Marine Air-Ground Task Force – Crisis Response – Central Command (SPMAGTF-CR-CC) GWOT deployment from March through October 2015. SPMAGTF-CR-CC was commanded by both 5th Marines and 7th Marines during this tenure.

A key event of this rotation involved a task force from 3/7, Task Force-"TQ" (comprising Kilo, Lima, Weapons, and H&S Marines), establishing a new US presence in al-Taqaddum, Iraq, in order to deny access and movement to ISIL holdings in Anbar province. This was discussed in American society as a sign of going back down the path to US combat "boots on the ground" in Iraq once again.

Task Force "Al-Asad" (composed largely of Kilo, Weapons, and H&S Company Marines), built partner capacity, trained, and assisted the Joint Task Force and Iraqi forces in their fight against the Islamic State in Anbar, deepening the U.S. role in efforts to halt the recent momentum of the extremists.

2016 - 2017 - 10th Tour

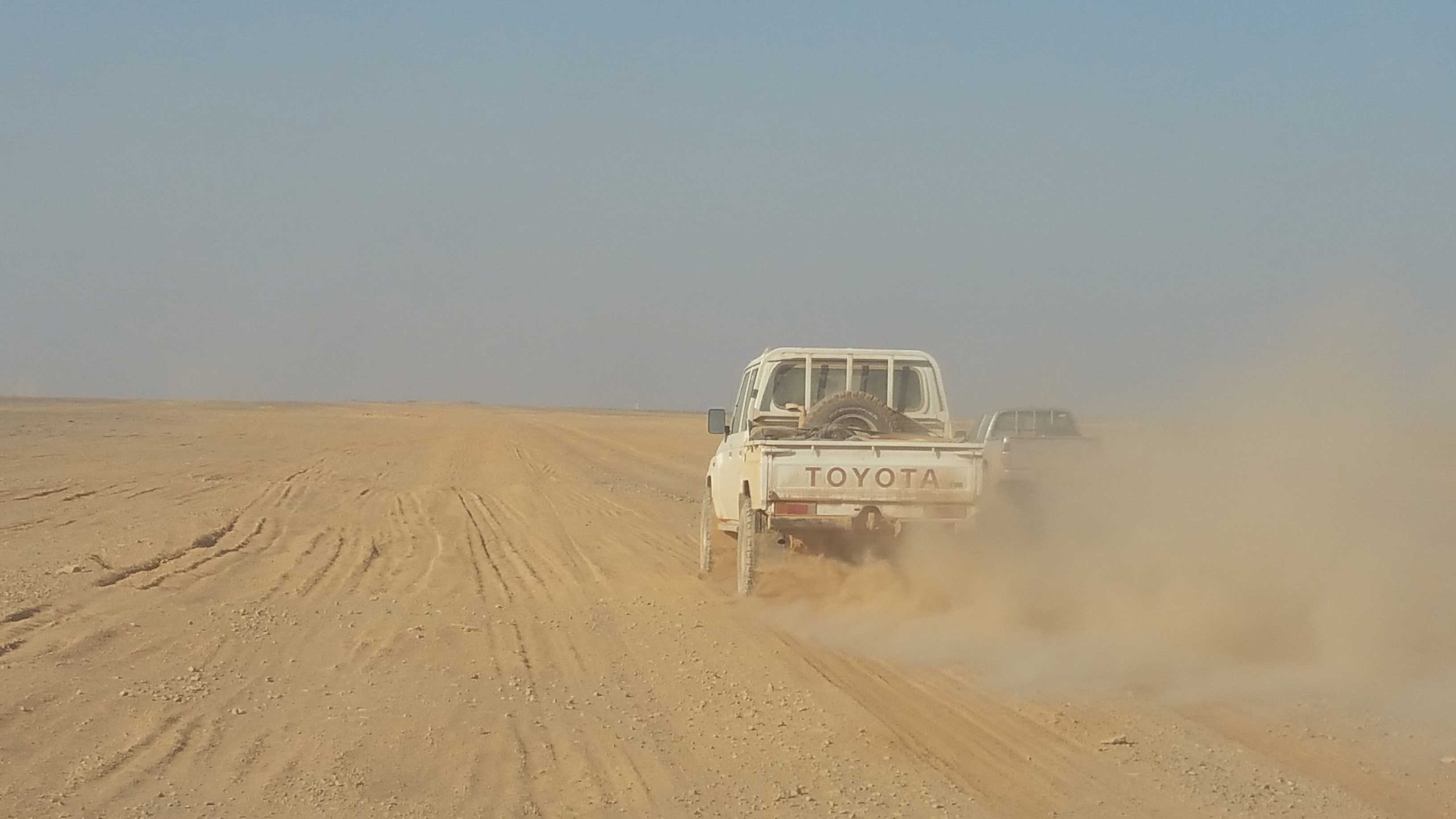
3/7 Marines operating a light-skinned, non-standard tactical vehicle convoy within the AOR.

Deploying in October 2016, 3/7 supported combat operations in Mosul, Iraq alongside joint and Iraqi Security Forces securing and liberating the besieged city in dense, urban street fighting against ISIL, supporting State Department and US Department of Defense initiatives in Syria fighting to disrupt ISIL and protect Internally Displaced Person (IDP) refugees around the Jordanian border, and sustained missions throughout the AOR.

The battalion returned home in April, 2017.

2018 - 11th Tour

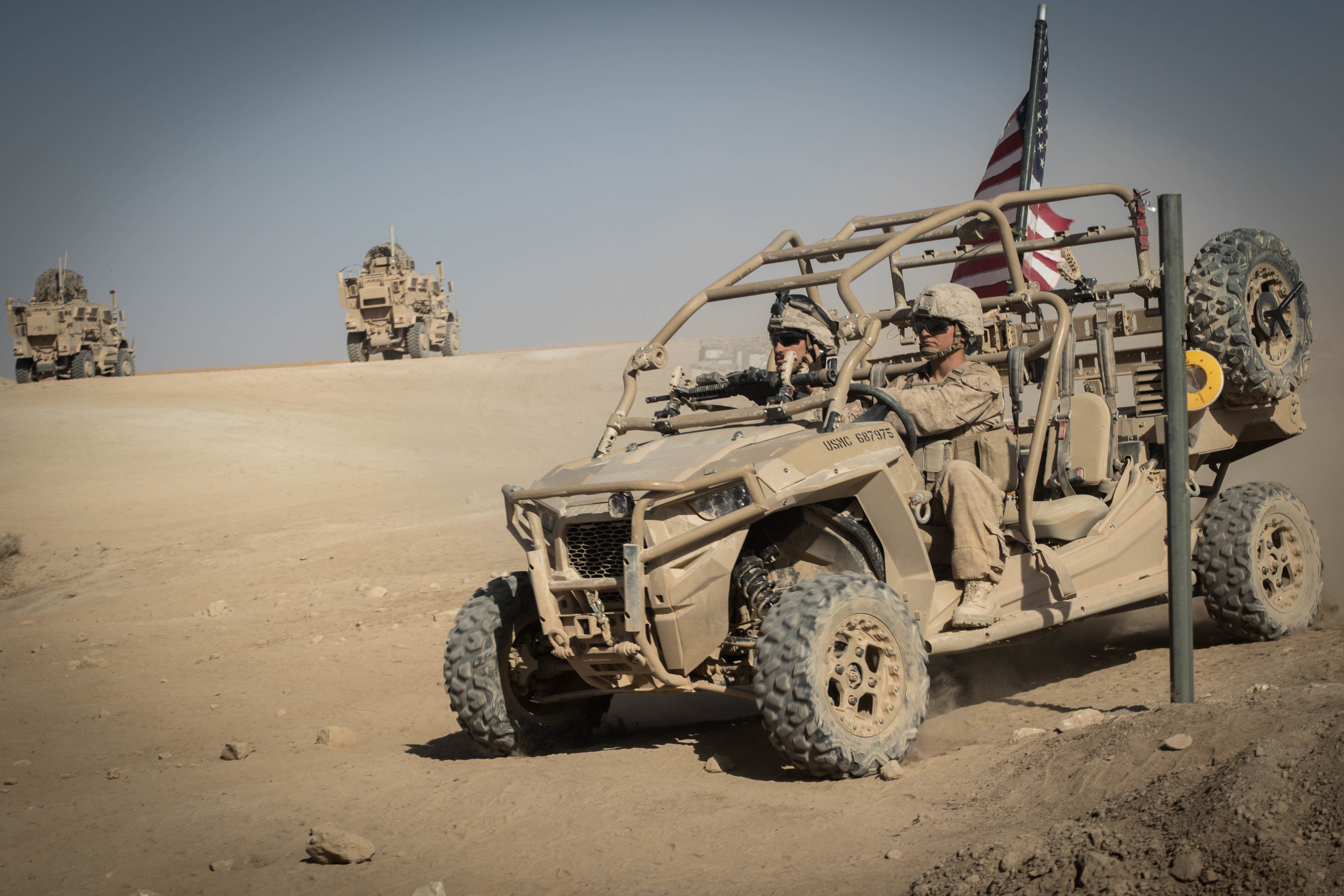
U.S. Marines with 3rd Battalion, 7th Marine Regiment, 1st Marine Division attached to Special Purpose Marine Air-Ground Task Force, Crisis Response-Central Command (SPMAGTF-CR-CC) drive a Utility Task Vehicle around security positions at Fire Base Um Jorais (FB UJ) 4 July 2018. (Cpl. Carlos Lopez/Marine Corps)

From March 2018 to October 2018 the battalion once again deployed in support of Operation Inherent Resolve, 3/7 was spread across the Middle East including areas in Syria, Iraq, Afghanistan, Kuwait, and Jordan doing mainly anti–ISIL operations.

== Medal of Honor recipients ==
World War II

- PFC Arthur J. Jackson – 18 September 1944
- PFC Wesley Phelps – 4 October 1944

Korean War

- 2ndLt Robert D. Reem – 6 November 1950
- Sgt James E. Johnson – 2 December 1950
- 2ndLt George H. Ramer – 12 September 1951
- SSgt William E. Shuck, Jr. – 3 July 1952
- Pvt Jack W. Kelso – 2 October 1952
- SSgt Lewis G. Watkins – 7 October 1952
- 2ndLt George H. O'Brien, Jr. – 27 October 1952

Vietnam War

- LCpl Roy M. Wheat – 11 August 1967
- HM3 Wayne M. Caron – 28 July 1968
- LCpl Kenneth L. Worley – 12 August 1968
- LCpl Lester W. Weber – 23 February 1969
- LCpl Jose F. Jimenez – 28 August 1969
- LCpl James D. Howe – 6 May 1970

Iraq War

- Cpl Jason Dunham – 14 April 2004

== Unit awards ==
3rd Battalion, 7th Marines has been presented with the following unit awards:

Streamer	Award	Year(s)	Additional Info
	Presidential Unit Citation Streamer with one Silver and four Bronze Stars	1942, 1944, 1945, 1950, 1950, 1951, 1965–1966, 1966–1967, 1967–1968, 2003	Guadalcanal, Peleliu-Ngesebus, Okinawa, Korea, Vietnam, Iraq
	Navy Unit Commendation Streamer with two Bronze Stars	1952–1953, 1965, 1990–1991, 2004, 2007, 2010	Korea, Vietnam, Southwest Asia, Iraq, Afghanistan (Sangin)
	Meritorious Unit Commendation Streamer	1968, 1968, 1969, 1990, 2015	Vietnam, Philippines, Central Command AOR
	Armed Forces Expeditionary Medal Streamer		
	American Defense Service Streamer with one Bronze Star	1941	World War II
	Asiatic-Pacific Campaign Streamer with one Silver Star		Guadalcanal, Eastern New Guinea, New Britain, Peleliu, Okinawa
	World War II Victory Streamer	1941–1945	Pacific War
	Navy Occupation Service Streamer with "ASIA"	1945–1946	Northern China
	China Service Streamer with one Bronze Star	September 1946 – June 1947	North China
	National Defense Service Streamer with three Bronze Stars	1950–1954, 1961–1974, 1990–1995, 2001–present	Korean War, Vietnam War, Gulf War, war on terrorism
	Korean Service Streamer with one Silver and two Bronze Stars		Korean War
	Vietnam Service Streamer with two Silver and three Bronze Stars	July 1965 – April 1971, April – December 1975	
	Southwest Asia Service Streamer with two Bronze Stars	September 1990 – February 1991	Desert Shield, Desert Storm
	Iraq Campaign Streamer	2003–present	
	Global War on Terrorism Expeditionary Streamer		March – May 2003
	Global War on Terrorism Service Streamer	2001–present	
	Korea Presidential Unit Citation Streamer		
	Vietnam Gallantry Cross with Palm Streamer		
	Vietnam Meritorious Unit Citation Civil Actions Streamer		

== See also ==
- List of United States Marine Corps battalions
- Organization of the United States Marine Corps

== Notes ==
http://valor.militarytimes.com/recipient.php?recipientid=23294

https://www.marines.mil/News/Messages/Messages-Display/Article/3106928/awards-update/
