= Kenneth L. Worley =

US Marine and Medal of Honor recipient (1948–1968)

Kenneth Lee Worley
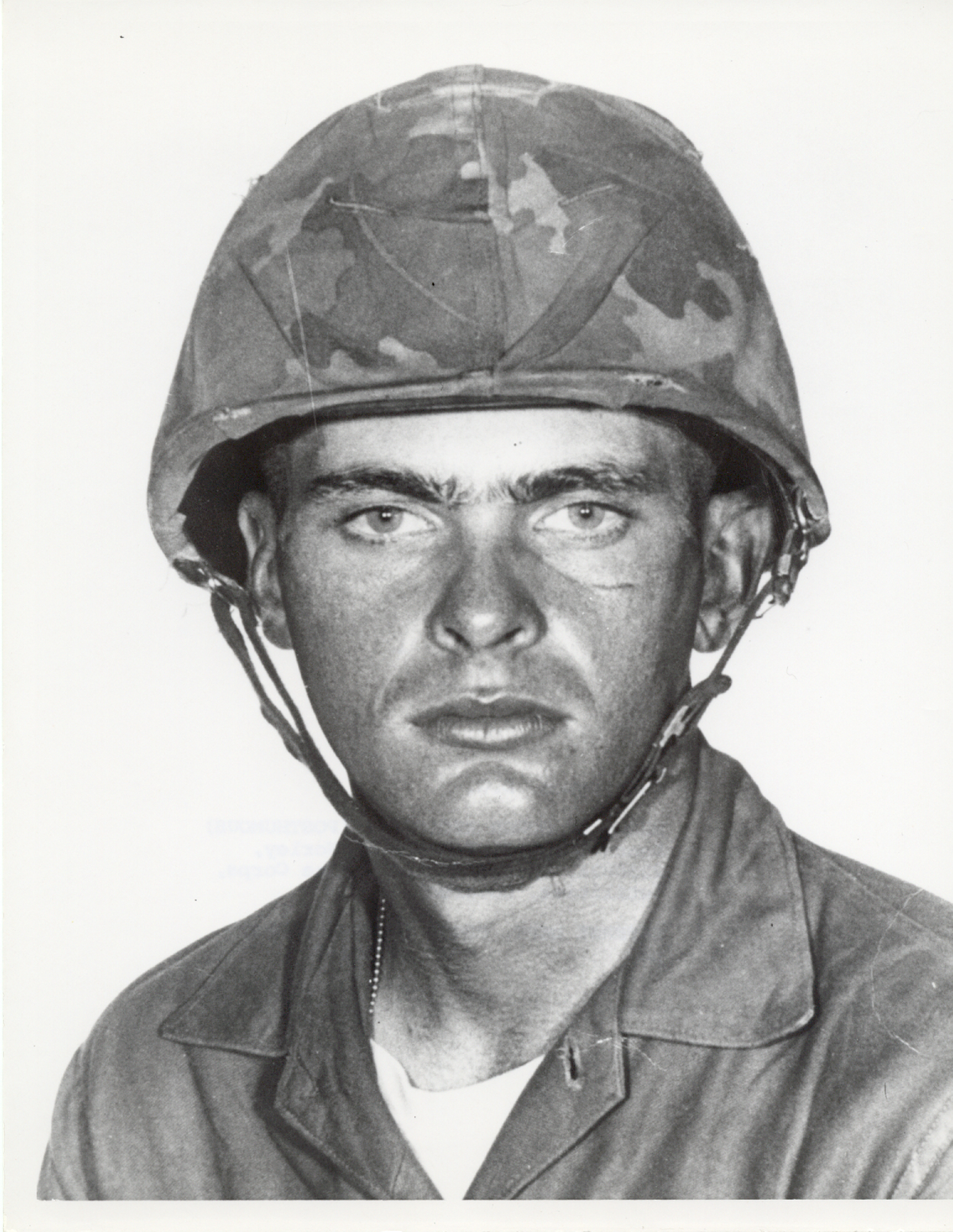
- Kenneth L. Worley, Medal of Honor recipient
- Born: April 27, 1948; Farmington, New Mexico, U.S.
- Died: August 12, 1968 (aged 20); Bo Ban, Quảng Nam Province, Republic of Vietnam
- Burial place: Westminster Memorial Park, Westminster, California
- Military career
- Allegiance: United States of America
- Branch: United States Marine Corps
- Service years: 1967–1968
- Rank: Lance Corporal
- Units: Company L, 3rd Battalion, 7th Marines, 1st Marine Division
- Conflicts: Vietnam War †
- Awards: Medal of Honor (1968); Purple Heart

Kenneth Lee Worley (April 4, 1948 – August 12, 1968) was a United States Marine who posthumously received the Medal of Honor for heroism in Vietnam. On August 12, 1968, Worley sacrificed his own life when he threw himself on a grenade to save the lives of several fellow Marines.

Joining the Marines in 1967, Worley was deployed to the Republic of Vietnam early in 1968. While setting up an ambush position in a hamlet of Quang Nam Province, an enemy grenade was thrown into the house where Worley was stationed. Worley jumped on the grenade, saving the fellow Marines in the house.

== Biography ==
Worley was born on April 27, 1948, in Farmington, New Mexico, and completed the 8th grade at Farmington Elementary School in 1962. After being orphaned, he moved to Truth or Consequences, New Mexico, and attended Hot Spring High School there for two years. He moved to Modesto, California, at age sixteen to live with an aunt. The conditions there were poor for Worley; he lived in a travel trailer with no running water or electricity. Instead of going to school, he worked as a truck driver, hauling loads of Christmas trees out of the mountains. After injuring his foot at work, he was taken in by Don and Rose Feyerherm of Modesto. They treated him like a son and became his foster parents.

Worley enlisted in the United States Marine Corps in Fresno, California, on June 14, 1967, he received recruit training with the 3rd Recruit Training Battalion, Recruit Training Regiment, Marine Corps Recruit Depot, San Diego, California. Upon completion of recruit training in August 1967, Pvt Worley was transferred to the Marine Corps Base, Camp Pendleton, California, and underwent individual combat training with Company R, 2nd Battalion, 2nd Infantry Training Regiment, and basic infantry training with the 2nd Infantry Training Regiment, completing the latter in October.

He was promoted to private first class on November 1, 1967, and, later that month, was ordered to the Republic of Vietnam. Assigned to the 3rd Battalion, 7th Marines, 1st Marine Division, he served consecutively as a rifleman with Company I, with Headquarters and Service Company, and with Company L. He was promoted to lance corporal on May 1, 1968. While serving as a machine gunner with Company L on August 12, 1968, he was killed in action, saving five fellow Marines by his actions.

Kenneth Worley is buried in Westminster Memorial Park, Westminster, California.

== Medals and decorations ==
A complete list of his medals and decorations include: the Medal of Honor, the Purple Heart, the National Defense Service Medal, the Vietnam Service Medal with four bronze stars, and the Republic of Vietnam Campaign Medal.

Medal of Honor		Purple Heart
National Defense Service Medal	Vietnam Service Medal with four bronze stars	Republic of Vietnam Campaign Medal

The Medal of Honor was presented posthumously to Worley's son and foster family, two years after he was killed.

== Medal of Honor citation ==
The President of the United States in the name of Congress takes pride in presenting the MEDAL OF HONOR posthumously to

LANCE CORPORAL KENNETH L. WORLEY
UNITED STATES MARINE CORPS

for service as set forth in the following CITATION:

For conspicuous gallantry and intrepidity at the risk of his life above and beyond the call of duty while serving as a Machine Gunner with Company L, Third Battalion, Seventh Marines, First Marine Division in action against enemy forces in the Republic of Vietnam. After establishing a night ambush position in a house in the Bo Ban Hamlet of Quang Nam Province, security was set up and the remainder of the patrol members retired until their respective watch. During the early morning hours of 12 August 1968, the Marines were abruptly awakened by the platoon leader's warning that "Grenades" had landed in the house. Fully realizing the inevitable result of his actions, Lance Corporal Worley, in a valiant act of heroism instantly threw himself upon the grenade nearest him and his comrades, absorbing with his own body, the full and tremendous force of the explosion. Through his extraordinary initiative and inspiring valor in the face of almost certain death, he saved his comrades from serious injury and possible loss of life although five of his fellow Marines incurred minor wounds as the other grenades exploded. Lance Corporal Worley's gallant actions upheld the highest traditions of the Marine Corps and the United States Naval Service. He gallantly gave his life for his country.

/S/ RICHARD M. NIXON

== Posthumous honors ==
Kenneth Worley's name is inscribed on the Vietnam Veterans Memorial ("The Wall"), on Panel 48 West, Line 01.

The "LCpl Kenneth L. Worley" Young Marine unit based in Norwalk, California, is named in honor of LCPL Worley.

== See also ==
- List of Medal of Honor recipients for the Vietnam War
