= Lester W. Weber =

Marine Corps Medal of Honor recipient

Lester William Weber
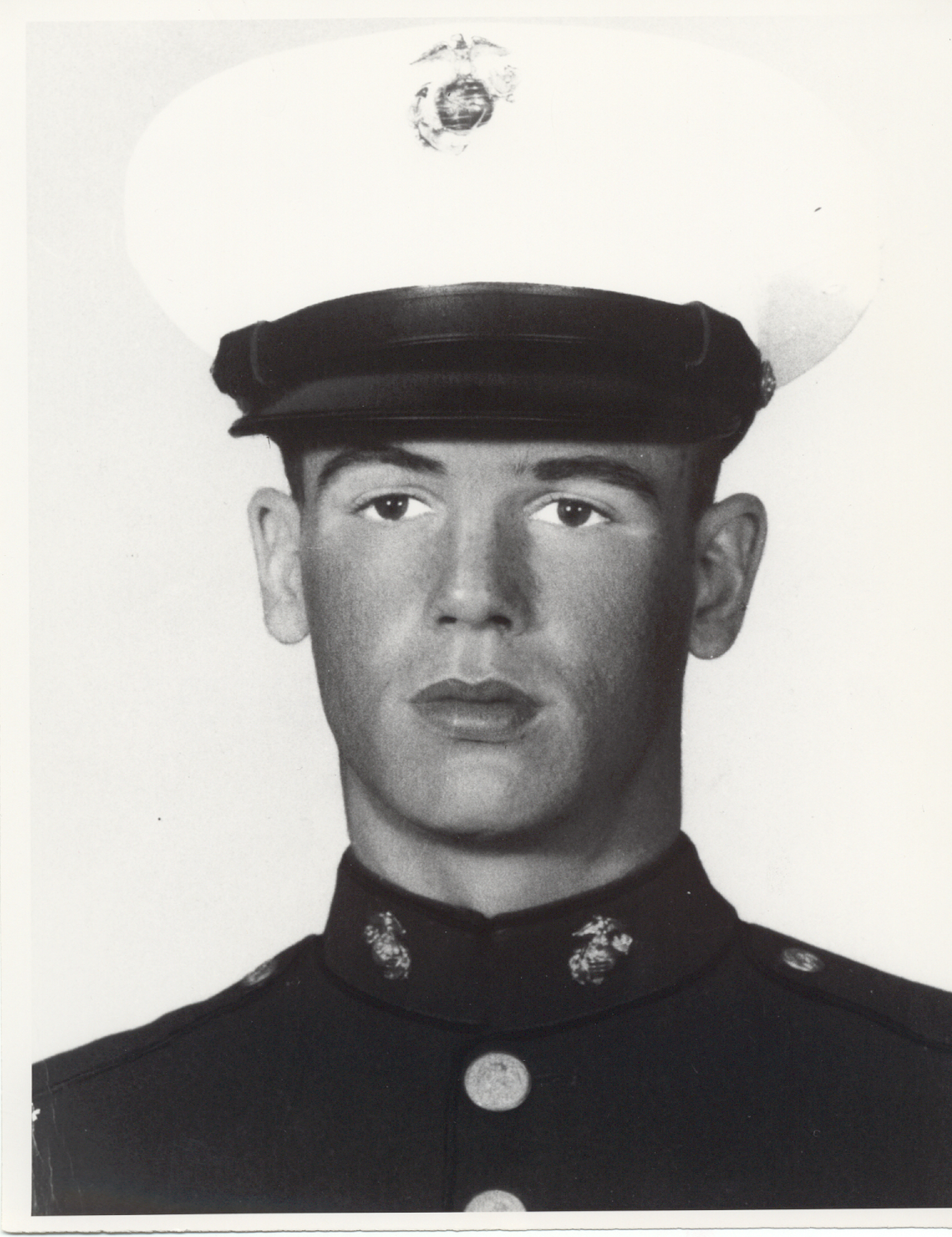
- Born: July 30, 1948; Aurora, Illinois, U.S.
- Died: February 23, 1969 (aged 20); Hiep Duc District, Quảng Nam Province, Republic of Vietnam
- Burial place: Clarendon Hills Cemetery, Darien, Illinois
- Military career
- Allegiance: United States of America
- Branch: United States Marine Corps
- Service years: 1966–1969
- Rank: Lance Corporal
- Units: Weapons Company, 3rd Battalion, 2nd Infantry Training Regiment; Headquarters and Service Company, 3rd Battalion, 7th Marines; 2nd Platoon, Company M, 3rd Battalion, 7th Marines, 1st Marine Division
- Conflicts: Vietnam War (DOW)
- Awards: Medal of Honor; Purple Heart

Lester William Weber (July 30, 1948 – February 23, 1969) was a United States Marine who posthumously received the Medal of Honor for heroism in Vietnam in February 1969.

== Early years ==
Weber was born on July 30, 1948, in Aurora, Illinois. He graduated from St. Isaac Jogues Grammar School in Hinsdale, Illinois, in 1962, then attended Hinsdale South High School for two years.

=== Marine Corps service ===
He left high school to enlist in the U.S. Marine Corps Reserve in Chicago on September 30, 1966. He subsequently enlisted in the Regular Marine Corps on January 23, 1967.

He completed recruit training at Marine Corps Recruit Depot San Diego, California in March 1967. After he transferred to Marine Corps Base Camp Pendleton, California, he received individual combat training with Company Z, and weapons special training with Weapons Company, 3rd Battalion, 2nd Infantry Training Regiment. He was promoted to Private First Class on June 1, 1967.

=== Vietnam War ===
He was ordered to the Republic of Vietnam in July 1967. PFC Weber was assigned duty as an ammunition carrier and squad leader with Headquarters and Service Company, 3rd Battalion, 7th Marines, 1st Marine Division. He was promoted to Lance Corporal on November 1, 1967.

On the morning of November 2, 1967 Webers Platoon, located on Hill 25 in the Dai Loc district of Quang Nam Province was attacked by a large, well equipped enemy force, spearheaded by Vietcong sappers, throwing satchel charges in all the bunkers and fighting holes they passed. The attackers completely destroyed the Marine positions on the western perimeter and had made it to the top of the hill, destroying the command post, mortar pit and ammunition bunker. The attack was only broken when the platoon Sergeant (SSgt. Gilbert Bolton) called a fire mission on the platoon’s position. Three volleys of artillery were dropped on Hill 25 (aka Danine Hill) mainly using variable-time-fuse airburst. The artillery broke the attack and allowed the remaining Marines to push the enemy off the hill. 10 Marines were killed outright, and a dozen more severely wounded. Lance Corporal Weber and his 106 rifle crew were fortunate as their bunker housed an M-60 machine gun, and was not directly attacked by the enemy. Lance Corporal Weber would complete his first 13 month tour in Vietnam and subsequently extend his tour for an additional six months.

In January 1969, he assumed duty as squad leader with the 2nd Platoon, Company M, 3rd Battalion, 7th Marines. While participating in a search and clear operation in the Bo Ban area of Hiep Duc District in Quảng Nam Province, he was killed in action on February 23, 1969.

Lance Corporal Weber had completed a normal tour of duty in Vietnam and had extended for six months.

=== Awards and decorations ===
A complete list of his medals and decorations include: the Medal of Honor, the Purple Heart, the National Defense Service Medal, the Vietnam Service Medal with one silver star in lieu of five bronze stars, and the Republic of Vietnam Campaign Medal.

Medal of Honor		Purple Heart
National Defense Service Medal	Vietnam Service Medal with one silver star	Republic of Vietnam Campaign Medal

== Medal of Honor citation ==
The President of the United States in the name of the Congress takes pride in presenting the MEDAL OF HONOR posthumously to

LANCE CORPORAL LESTER W. WEBER
UNITED STATES MARINE CORPS

for service as set forth in the following CITATION:

For conspicuous gallantry and intrepidity at the risk of his life above and beyond the call of duty while serving as a Machine Gun Squad Leader with Company M, Third Battalion, Seventh Marines, First Marine Division, in action against the enemy in the Republic of Vietnam. On 23 February 1969, the Second Platoon of Company M was dispatched to the Bo Ban area of Hieu Duc District in Quang Nam Province to assist a squad from another platoon which had become heavily engaged with a well-entrenched enemy battalion. While moving through a rice paddy covered with tall grass, Lance Corporal Weber's platoon came under heavy attack from concealed hostile soldiers. He reacted by plunging into the tall grass, successfully attacking one enemy and forcing eleven others to break contact. Upon encountering a second North Vietnamese Army soldier, he overwhelmed him in fierce hand-to-hand combat. Observing two other soldiers firing upon his comrades from behind a dike, Lance Corporal Weber ignored the frenzied firing of the enemy and, racing across the hazardous area, dived into their position. He neutralized the position by wresting weapons from the hands of the two soldiers and overcoming them. Although by now the target for concentrated fire from hostile riflemen, Lance Corporal Weber remained in a dangerously exposed position to shout words of encouragement to his emboldened companions. As he moved forward to attack a fifth enemy soldier, he was mortally wounded. Lance Corporal Weber's indomitable courage, aggressive fighting spirit and unwavering devotion to duty upheld the highest traditions of the Marine Corps and the United States Naval Service. He gallantly gave his life for his country.

/S/ RICHARD M. NIXON

== In memory ==
Lester W. Weber's name can be found on the Vietnam Veterans Memorial on Panel 31W, Row 029.

A memorial stone honoring Lester W. Weber was set in the ground near the northwest corner of the St. Isaac Jogues Grammar School near the school's flagpole and dedicated on May 25, 2003.

The Marine Barracks at Naval Air Station North Island in San Diego, California was named Weber Hall to honor his memory.

== See also ==
- List of Medal of Honor recipients
- Marine (military)
