= James Hamilton Howe =

American musician and academic (1856–1934)

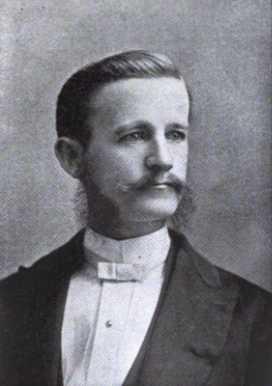
- Born: November 14, 1856; Boxford, Massachusetts, US
- Died: April 12, 1934 (aged 77); Seattle, Washington, US
- Burial place: Harmony Cemetery, Boxford, Massachusetts
- Education: College of Music, Boston University, 1882
- Occupations: Musician, conductor, composer, academic
- Employer: DePauw University

James Hamilton Howe (November 14, 1856, – April 12, 1934) was an American pianist, composer, conductor, and academic. Howe was the first dean of the Music School at DePauw University. He was instrumental in creating Alpha Chi Omega collegiate women's fraternity, one of the first Greek letter organizations for women in the United States.

Howe was the conductor of the San Francisco Symphony Orchestra and director of numerous oratorio societies in San Francisco and Seattle. He was also a composer of music for the piano, organ, orchestra, and vocals.

== Early life ==
Howe was born November 14, 1856, in Boxford in Essex County, Massachusetts. His parents were Mary Ann (née Lowe) and Edward Everett Howe. He was the sixth of their eight children.

Howe graduated from the New England Conservatory of Music in 1878. He enrolled in the College of Music of Boston University, graduating with an M.B. in 1882. Howe was a pianist.

== Career ==
=== Boston ===
Howe taught at the New England Conservatory of Music in Boston, Massachusetts. In addition, he worked as an organist and choir director in Boston.

=== DePauw University ===
In 1884, Howe became the first dean of the Music School at DePauw University in Greencastle, Indiana. During his first year as dean, he performed the first recital of the School of Music. He also presented lecture recitals on the “History of Pianoforte Technique” and “My System of Pianoforte Technique". Howe's program was recreated by piano professors Glen Sherman, Claude Cymerman, and Lorna Griffitt for the celebration of the School of Music's centennial in 1984.

In 1885, Howe noticed that the other departments at DePauw had student organizations and decided that a national women's musical society would benefit the Music School and its students. He invited seven students—Anna Allen, Olive Burnett, Bertha Deniston, Amy DuBois, Nellie Gamble, Bessie Grooms and Estelle Leonard—to a meeting to discuss creating a society. As a result, Alpha Chi Omega women's fraternity was established on October 16, 1885. It was one of the first six Greek letter organizations for women in the United States. Howe formally introduced the fraternity to the university with a soirée musical on February 26, 1886. He would maintain his involvement in Alpha Chi Omega after leaving the university, for the next 25 years.

Howe created a second music sorority called Phi Mu Epsilon in 1892. It remained a local sorority until 1902, when a second chapter was established at Syracuse University, before affiliating with Mu Phi Epsilon in 1906.

During his ten years as dean of the Music School, Howe established its curriculum and a vigorous performance schedule. He fought opposition to an opera program. Between 1884 and 1894, hundreds of students took classes, with 22 graduating. Although the school had strong enrollment, Howe's administration resulted in $3,000 in debt ($101,469 in 2022's money); the debt consisted of outstanding student deposits and unpaid faculty salaries.

=== California ===
In 1896, Howe was the conductor of the San Francisco Symphony Orchestra for a series of ten semi-popular symphony concerts in held the Golden Gate Hall. He was one of two oratorio leaders of San Francisco. He was the conductor of the San Francisco Oratorio Society, the Oakland Oratorio, and the San Jose Oratorio Society. In April 1897, Howe was the conductor for a music festival that featured the three oratorio socieities and a combined chorus of 200 to 250 singers. Ultimately, Howe was unable to secure enough money or find the material needed to carry out his long-term plans for the oratorio societies. His competition, H. B. Steward, also failed, and oratorio died out in San Francisco.

In the summer of 1899, Howe founded and was the director of the Pacific Grove Summer School of Music in Pacific Grove, California. The summer school provided two months of study with first-class musicians. Howe taught chorus, composition, harmony, oratorio interpretation, and pianoforte. He also directed the summer school for a second year in 1900. The Pacific Grove Summer School of Music continued into the 1950s.

Howe was the organist and music director of St. Paul's Episcopal Church in San Francisco in 1900 In 1901, he was the organist and director of the choir at St. Dominic's Catholic Church in San Francisco. He also taught organ, pianoforte, harmony, and voice. He was the musical director of the Howe Club of San Francisco in 1904.

=== Seattle ===
Howe left San Francisco and moved to Seattle in 1906. He was the first musical director and conductor of the Seattle Choral Symphony Society in 1906. However, he soon had a falling out with the members of the Ladies Musical Club who had chartered the society. They created the Seattle Symphony Orchestra Association, a rival organization; however, Howe already had most of the symphony-quality musicians of Seattle on contract.

In September 1916, Howe was the pianist and accompanist for several concerts in Alaska and British Columbia and with Aileen Ferluce, an Alaskan prima donna and harpist. In 1922, Howe was the dean of the American College of Music in Seattle. He taught classes, gave concerts and developed the college's course of study. He was also a Seattle School of Music professor.

By December 1922, Howe had composed 200 works. His The Olympic Suite was inspired by a trip on the Great Northern Railway through the Cascade Range and Rocky Mountains in July 1922. It included twelve movements including "Ode to Mount Olympus", "The Red Velvet Rose of Seattle", "The Rippling Waters of Queets", and "Tahoma Suite". Howe performed "The Rippling Waters of Queets" on piano for Washington State Federation Day at the Pacific Northwest Products Exhibition in February 1923. He premiered parts of The Olympic Suite in a series of radio concerts on KDZE that were heard by some 100,000 people. The radio show included Howe's narration, violinist Arnold Krauss, soprano Florita Munson-Wroten, soprano Dimples Marie David, and a chorus of twelve. The Olympic Suite was published as a book with related photographs.

In February 1923, Howe composed "Our Washington", intended to be the state song, with Martha Washington. He composed for the Seattle Oratorio Society in 1928. In 1929, he performed music and gave lecture-recitals for ladies clubs and colleges. One of his lectures, "The Red Devils of the Board of Trade", was not musical and showed his new interest in the stock market and consumer issues. He also wrote The Dragon and Juggernaut of Speculation as Exemplified in Gambling in Prices of Our Food Products.

== Honors ==
A variety of dahlia was named in his honor.

== Personal life ==
Howe married Liley Cramphorn in the First Methodist Episcopal Church of San Jose on December 12, 1899. She was originally from Rochester, England but was living in San Jose where she was the secretary of the Pacific Grove Summer School of Music. The church was decorated by the San Jose Oratorio Society. The San Francisco Oratorio Society and San Francisco Philharmonic Society hosted their reception at the of Mr. and Mrs. James E. Gordon. The couple did not have any children.

Howe was a member of the Sons of the American Revolution.

After a long sickness, Howe died on April 12, 1934, in Seattle, Washington at the age of 75. He was buried in the Harmony Cemetery in Boxford, Massachusetts. Howe left his estate to Ruth G. Chastain, his student for two years and a former music teacher. Rather than a will, Howe wrote a certificate of gift on September 4, 1933, in consideration of his engagement with Chastain. Chastain told the press that they had not set a date for their marriage.

== Works ==
=== Songs and music ===
- Sacred Songs for Contrello or Bass. Boston: Arthur P. Schmidt & Co., 1884.
- Four Songs with Accompaniment of Pianoforte, Violin, and Violoncello. Boston: Arthur P. Schmidt & Co., 1884.
- Songs of DePauw: A Collection of College Songs. Boston: J. M. Russell, 1890.
- Boys of the U.S.A. Seattle: Harvey J. Woods, 1918.
- The Banner of Freedom and Fame: A National Song Dedicated to The American Legion and Veterans of Foreign Wars. Words by John Julius Jones and music by James Hamilton Howe. 1920.
- The Olympic Suite ... For Pianoforte, Voice, and Orchestra, etc., 1922.

=== Books ===
- The Dragon and Juggernaut of Speculation as Exemplified in Gambling in Prices of Our Food Products. Written especially for the Education and Protection of Our Young Men and Women, About to Enter the Business or Professional World; and a Warning to Our Produce Growers and Provision Packers. Seattle: The Dragon Publishing Company, 1916.
