= James D. Howe =

James Donnie Howe
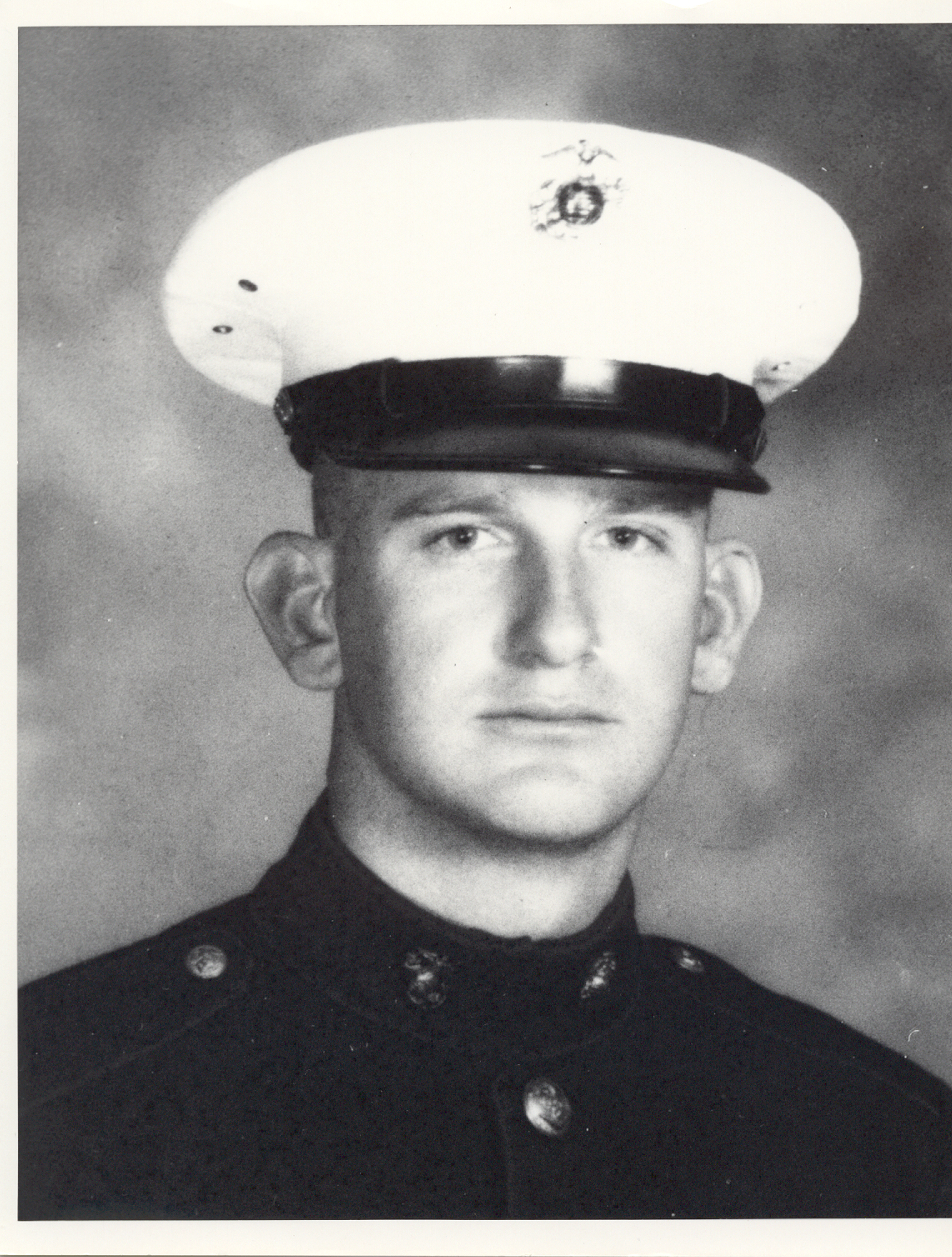
- James D. Howe, posthumous Medal of Honor recipient
- Born: December 17, 1948; Six Mile, South Carolina, U.S.
- Died: May 6, 1970 (aged 21); Quảng Nam Province, South Vietnam
- Burial place: Liberty Memorial Gardens, Liberty, South Carolina
- Military career
- Allegiance: United States of America
- Branch: United States Marine Corps
- Service years: 1968–1970
- Rank: Lance Corporal
- Units: Company I, 3rd Battalion, 7th Marines, 1st Marine Division
- Conflicts: Vietnam War †
- Awards: Medal of Honor; Purple Heart

James Donnie Howe (December 17, 1948 – May 6, 1970) was a United States Marine who posthumously received the Medal of Honor for his heroic actions in May 1970 during the Vietnam War.

== Biography ==
James Donnie Howe was born on December 17, 1948, in Six Mile, South Carolina, the first child and only son of Frances (née Pilgrim) and Odis Samuel Howe.

He attended Six Mile and Pickens Elementary Schools, graduated from Cateeche Elementary School in Cateeche, South Carolina, in June 1960, and then attended Liberty Junior High School in Liberty, South Carolina, from September 1960 until June 1961.

He was employed by Lloyd's Incorporated, a paint contractor, in Easley, South Carolina, prior to enlisting in the U.S. Marine Corps Reserve on October 31, 1968, in Fort Jackson, South Carolina. He was discharged from the Reserves on December 29, 1968, and enlisted in the regular Marine Corps the following day.

Private Howe received recruit training with the Recruit Training Battalion, Marine Corps Recruit Depot, Parris Island, South Carolina, and individual combat training with the 2nd Infantry Training Battalion, 1st Infantry Training Regiment, Camp Lejeune, North Carolina.

Promoted to private first class on June 4, 1969, Howe was transferred later that month to the Republic of Vietnam. He served as a rifleman and later, as a radio operator with Company I, 3rd Battalion, 7th Marines, 1st Marine Division. He was promoted to lance corporal on December 27, 1969.

In the early morning hours of May 6, 1970, while serving as a rifleman on operations in Quang Nam Province, Republic of Vietnam, he was mortally wounded.

== Decorations ==
A complete list of his medals and decorations includes: the Medal of Honor, Purple Heart, the Combat Action Ribbon, the National Defense Service Medal, the Vietnam Service Medal with one bronze star, and the Republic of Vietnam Campaign Medal.

Medal of Honor	Purple Heart	Combat Action Ribbon
National Defense Service Medal	Vietnam Service Medal with one bronze star	Republic of Vietnam Campaign Medal

== Medal of Honor citation ==
The President of the United States takes pride in presenting the MEDAL OF HONOR posthumously to

LANCE CORPORAL JAMES D. HOWE
UNITED STATES MARINE CORPS

for service as set forth in the following CITATION:

For conspicuous gallantry and intrepidity at the risk of his life above and beyond the call of duty while serving as a Rifleman with Company I, Third Battalion, Seventh Marines, First Marine Division in connection with combat operations against enemy forces in the Republic of Vietnam. In the early morning hours of 6 May 1970, Lance Corporal Howe and two other Marines were occupying a defensive position in a sandy beach area fronted by bamboo thickets. Enemy sappers suddenly launched a grenade attack against the position, utilizing the cover of darkness to carry out their assault. Following the initial explosions of the grenades, Lance Corporal Howe and his two comrades moved to a more advantageous position in order to return suppressive fire. When an enemy grenade landed in their midst, Lance Corporal Howe immediately shouted a warning and then threw himself upon the deadly missile, thereby protecting the lives of his fellow Marines. His heroic and selfless action was in keeping with the finest traditions of the Marine Corps and the United States Naval Service. He gallantly gave his life in the service of his country.

/S/ RICHARD M. NIXON

== Posthumous honors ==
On May 19, 2004, the South Carolina General Assembly passed Joint Resolution 5294 commending native South Carolinian James D. Howe for his Medal of Honor actions.

== See also ==
- List of Medal of Honor recipients
- List of Medal of Honor recipients for the Vietnam War
