= Commanding ground =

In fortification, a commanding ground is an area that overlooks any post, or strong place. Of this there were three sorts: first, a front commanding ground, which is a height opposite to the face of the post, which plays upon its front; second, a reverse commanding ground, which is an eminence that can play upon the back of any place or post; and third, an enfilade commanding ground, or curtain commanding ground, which is a high place, that can with its shot scour all the length of a straight line. According to von Clausewitz, commanding ground can be either a singular point within a limited area for a single combat, or a larger series of geographic features that provide the same effect for multiple combats.
