= List of Theta Chi chapters =

Theta Chi fraternity has chartered 245 chapters, of which 150 are active as of 2024. Its first 24 chapters were given single Greek letter designations (Alpha, Beta, etc.), and all following chapters were given double Greek letter designations (Alpha Beta, Alpha Gamma, etc.) with no use of double letters (no Alpha Alpha, Beta Beta, etc.).

Following is a list of Theta Chi chapters, with active chapters indicated in bold and inactive chapters and institutions in italics.

Chapter	Charter date and range	Institution	Location	Status	Ref.
Alpha	April 10, 1856 – 1960	Norwich University	Northfield, Vermont	Inactive	(Note: Chapter closed when the university banned fraternities.)
**Beta**	December 13, 1902	Massachusetts Institute of Technology	Cambridge, Massachusetts	Active	
**Gamma**	May 20, 1907	University of Maine	Orono, Maine	Active	(Note: Chapter formed by absorbing Delta Mu (local), established in 1904.)
**Delta**	September 25, 1908	Rensselaer Polytechnic Institute	Troy, New York	Active	
**Epsilon**	May 9, 1909	Worcester Polytechnic Institute	Worcester, Massachusetts	Active	(Note: Chapter formed by absorbing Pi Omega Pi (local), established in 1905.)
**Zeta**	1910–1974, 1984–1993, 2014	University of New Hampshire	Durham, New Hampshire	Active	(Note: Chapter formed by absorbing Delta Xi (local), established in 1903.)
**Eta**	1911–1988, 1990–1992, 2011	University of Rhode Island	Kingston, Rhode Island	Active	
**Theta**	1911–1982, 1991–1998, 2004	University of Massachusetts	Amherst, Massachusetts	Active	(Note: Chapter formed by absorbing Theta Phi (local), established in 1906.)
**Iota**	March 17, 1912	Colgate University	Hamilton, New York	Active	(Note: Chapter formed by absorbing Theta Mu (local), established in 1911.)
Kappa	1912–1960	University of Pennsylvania	Philadelphia, Pennsylvania	Inactive	(Note: Chapter formed by absorbing Phi Beta Alpha (local), established in 1910.)
Lambda	1912–1983, 1985–1999	Cornell University	Ithaca, New York	Inactive	(Note: Chapter formed by absorbing Amphia (local), established in 1909. After going inactive, the chapter was re-established in 1985 by absorbing Phi Sigma Epsilon, established in 1963. It was also re-established as a colony in 2002.)
**Mu**	1913–1993, 1998	University of California	Berkeley, California	Active	(Note: Chapter formed by absorbing Unity (local), established in 1903.)
**Nu**	1914–1995, 1999	Hampden–Sydney College	Hampden Sydney, Virginia	Active	(Note: Chapter formed by absorbing Delta Delta (local), established in 1911. After going dormant, it was re-established in 1999 by absorbing Kappa Psi Chi (local), established in 1996.)
**Xi**	1914–2024, 2026	University of Virginia	Charlottesville, Virginia	Active	(Note: Chapter formed by absorbing Eta Pi Rho (local), established in 1913.)
Omicron	1915–1996, 2013–2022	University of Richmond	Richmond, Virginia	Inactive	
Pi	1916–2009	Dickinson College	Carlisle, Pennsylvania	Inactive	
**Rho**	1916–1972, 1991	University of Illinois	Champaign and Urbana, Illinois	Active	
**Sigma**	May 27, 1916	Oregon State University	Corvallis, Oregon	Active	
**Tau**	September 29, 1916	University of Florida	Gainesville, Florida	Active	
**Upsilon**	1917–1968, 1988–1991	New York University	New York City, New York	Inactive	
**Phi**	May 11, 1917	North Dakota State University	Fargo, North Dakota	Active	
**Chi**	April 20, 1918	Auburn University	Auburn, Alabama	Active	
**Psi**	1918–1937, 1941–2005, 2011	University of Wisconsin	Madison, Wisconsin	Active	
**Omega**	March 14, 1919	Penn State University	University Park, Pennsylvania	Active	(Note: Delta Kappa Nu (local), a group that dated from 1921 became the Iota Alpha chapter of Theta Upsilon Omega in 1924. After creation, it absorbed another small local, Pi Kappa Nu. Later, in a national merger, this chapter joined with the pre-existing Omega chapter of Theta Chi, in 1938.)
Alpha Alpha				Unassigned	
**Alpha Beta**	1919–1999, 2023	University of Pittsburgh	Pittsburgh, Pennsylvania	Active	
Alpha Gamma	1919–2022	University of Michigan	Ann Arbor, Michigan	Inactive	
**Alpha Delta**	March 26, 1920	Purdue University	West Lafayette, Indiana	Active	(Note: In 1937, the Zeta chapter of Delta Sigma Lambda merged into the existing Purdue chapter of Theta Chi.)
Alpha Epsilon	1920–1988	Stanford University	Stanford, California	Inactive	
**Alpha Zeta**	June 11, 1920	University of Rochester	Rochester, New York	Active	
Alpha Eta	1920–1939, 1949–1963, 1985–1994	University of North Carolina	Chapel Hill, North Carolina	Inactive	
Alpha Theta	1921–1952	Dartmouth College	Hanover, New Hampshire	Withdrew	(Note: This chapter originated as Iota Sigma Upsilon (local), which had formed in 1920. In 1952, this chapter withdrew to form Alpha Theta (local), no longer affiliated with Theta Chi.)
**Alpha Iota**	1921–2001, 2006	Indiana University	Bloomington, Indiana	Active	(Note: This chapter originated as the Delphian Club (local) in 1905.)
**Alpha Kappa**	1921–1937, 1949	West Virginia University	Morgantown, West Virginia	Active	
**Alpha Lambda**	1921–1943, 1946–1996, 2017	Ohio State University	Columbus, Ohio	Active	
**Alpha Mu**	December 22, 1922	Iowa State University	Ames, Iowa	Active	
**Alpha Nu**	May 28, 1923	Georgia Tech	Atlanta, Georgia	Active	
**Alpha Xi**	1923–1988, 1998	University of Delaware	Newark, Delaware	Active	
Alpha Omicron	1924–2024	Washington State University	Pullman, Washington	Inactive	
**Alpha Pi**	March 8, 1924 – February 14, 2000, December 7, 2013	University of Minnesota	Minneapolis, Minnesota	Active	
**Alpha Rho**	February 27, 1925	University of Washington	Seattle, Washington	Active	
**Alpha Sigma**	March 6, 1925 – 2012, 2016	University of Oregon	Eugene, Oregon	Active	
**Alpha Tau**	May 9, 1925	Ohio University	Athens, Ohio	Active	
**Alpha Upsilon**	1925–1939, 1949–1998, 2012–2021	University of Nebraska–Lincoln	Lincoln, Nebraska	Colony	(Note: Chapter reformed as a colony in 2023.)
**Alpha Phi**	1926	University of Alabama	Tuscaloosa, Alabama	Active	
**Alpha Chi**	1928	Syracuse University	Syracuse, New York	Active	
**Alpha Psi**	1929	University of Maryland	College Park, Maryland	Active	
Alpha Omega	1930–2003	Lafayette College	Easton, Pennsylvania	Inactive	
**Beta Alpha**	April 10, 1931	UCLA	Los Angeles, California	Active	
Beta Beta				Unassigned	
Beta Gamma	1932–1990	University of North Dakota	Grand Forks, North Dakota	Inactive	
Beta Delta	1932–2004, 2008–2022	Rutgers University	New Brunswick, New Jersey	Inactive	
Beta Epsilon	1937–1993	University of Montana	Missoula, Montana	Inactive	(Note: This group had its origin in 1924 as the Templar Club (local). In 1927 it became the Theta chapter of Delta Sigma Lambda. That fraternity was fracturing, so in 1937, in a merger, the chapter became the Beta Epsilon chapter of Theta Chi.)
**Beta Zeta**	June 10, 1939 – 2013, 2017	Michigan State University	East Lansing, Michigan	Active	(Note: This chapter had its origin on November 7, 1908, with the establishment of the Delphic Literary Society (local) – national fraternity chapters were not permitted on the Michigan State campus until 1922. Delphic joined Theta Chi on June 9, 1939, as the Beta Zeta chapter.)
Beta Eta	1940–2022	Washington College	Chestertown, Maryland	Inactive	
**Beta Theta**	May 24, 1940 – 1963, 1969	Drexel University	Philadelphia, Pennsylvania	Active	
Beta Iota	1941–1973, 2011–2019	University of Arizona	Tucson, Arizona	Inactive	(Note: This group had its origin in 1912 as the Square & Compass Club (local). It became the Delta chapter of Delta Sigma Lambda in 1930, but that national soon failed. After a few years as a local operation, the group became the Beta Iota chapter of Theta Chi in 1941.)
**Beta Kappa**	May 15, 1942	Hamline University	Saint Paul, Minnesota	Active	(Note: Formed by absorbing the Alpha chapter of Beta Kappa fraternity)
**Beta Lambda**	February 21, 1942 – 1994, April 4, 1997	University of Akron	Akron, Ohio	Active	
Beta Mu	1942–1970	Middlebury College	Middlebury, Vermont	Inactive	
**Beta Nu**	May 16, 1942	Case Western Reserve University	Cleveland, Ohio	Active	
Beta Xi	1942–2024	Birmingham–Southern College	Birmingham, Alabama	Inactive	
**Beta Omicron**	June 5, 1942 – 2005, May 11, 2013	University of Cincinnati	Cincinnati, Ohio	Active	
Beta Pi	1942–1990	Monmouth College	Monmouth, Illinois	Inactive	
**Beta Rho**	May 23, 1942	Illinois Wesleyan University	Bloomington, Illinois	Active	
**Beta Sigma**	May 9, 1942	Lehigh University	Bethlehem, Pennsylvania	Active	
Beta Tau	1942–1992, 2006–2019	University of Southern California	Los Angeles, California	Inactive	
Beta Upsilon	1942–2012	California State University, Fresno	Fresno, California	Inactive	
**Beta Phi**	October 31, 1942 – 1971, 2014	University of Nevada	Reno, Nevada	Active	
Beta Chi	1942–2024	Allegheny College	Meadville, Pennsylvania	Inactive	
**Beta Psi**	December 5, 1942 -2011, 2014	Presbyterian College	Clinton, South Carolina	Active	(Note: created as the Epsilon chapter of Chi Tau fraternity in 1924, joining Beta Kappa in 1930 after Chi Tau's dissolution, and later participating in the merger into Theta Chi.)
**Beta Omega**	December 12, 1942	Susquehanna University	Selinsgrove, Pennsylvania	Active	
Gamma Alpha	1942–1960	University of Tennessee at Chattanooga	Chattanooga, Tennessee	Inactive	
Gamma Beta	1942–1964	Furman University	Greenville, South Carolina	Inactive	
Gamma Gamma				Unassigned	
**Gamma Delta**	May 4, 1946 – 1998, 2009	Florida Southern College	Lakeland, Florida	Active	
Gamma Epsilon	1946–1999	Western Colorado University	Gunnison, Colorado	Inactive	
**Gamma Zeta**	May 3, 1947 – 1968, 1996–2005, April 28, 2012	Oklahoma State University	Stillwater, Oklahoma	Active	
Gamma Eta	1947–1984, 1991–2000, 2010–2012	Bucknell University	Lewisburg, Pennsylvania	Inactive	
Gamma Theta	1947–2009, 2013–2019	San Diego State University	San Diego, California	Inactive	
Gamma Iota	1948–1966	University of Connecticut	Storrs, Connecticut	Inactive	
**Gamma Kappa**	March 20, 1948	Miami University	Oxford, Ohio	Active	
**Gamma Lambda**	April 4, 1948 – 1980, 1997	University of Denver	Denver, Colorado	Active	
**Gamma Mu**	April 3, 1948 – 2000, December 4, 2021	Bowling Green State University	Bowling Green, Ohio	Active	
**Gamma Nu**	April 9, 1948 – 1995, 2021	New Mexico State University	Las Cruces, New Mexico	Active	
**Gamma Xi**	May 15, 1948	San Jose State University	San Jose, California	Active	
Gamma Omicron	1948-2023	Wake Forest University	Winston-Salem, North Carolina	Inactive	
**Gamma Pi**	1949–1972, 1989–1995, 2018	University at Buffalo	Buffalo, New York	Inactive	
**Gamma Rho**	March 5, 1949 – 2001, 2006	Florida State University	Tallahassee, Florida	Active	
**Gamma Sigma**	1949–2006, April 22, 2023	Duke University	Durham, North Carolina	Active	
**Gamma Tau**	April 23, 1949	Drake University	Des Moines, Iowa	Active	
**Gamma Upsilon**	April 30, 1949	Bradley University	Peoria, Illinois	Active	
**Gamma Phi**	April 30, 1949	Nebraska Wesleyan University	Lincoln, Nebraska	Active	
**Gamma Chi**	May 14, 1949	Randolph–Macon College	Ashland, Virginia	Active	
Gamma Psi	1949–1981	University of Puget Sound	Tacoma, Washington	Inactive	
Gamma Omega	1949–1960	Vanderbilt University	Nashville, Tennessee	Inactive	
**Delta Alpha**	December 3, 1949	Linfield University	McMinnville, Oregon	Active	
**Delta Beta**	December 10, 1949	University of Georgia	Athens, Georgia	Active	
**Delta Gamma**	January 7, 1950 – 1993, 1996	West Virginia Wesleyan College	Buckhannon, West Virginia	Active	
Delta Delta				Unassigned	
**Delta Epsilon**	1950–1963, March 23, 2024	University of Miami	Coral Gables, Florida	Active	
Delta Zeta	May 7, 1950 – 2022	University of Nebraska Omaha	Omaha, Nebraska	Inactive	
**Delta Eta**	1950–1973, 2013	Colorado State University	Fort Collins, Colorado	Active	
**Delta Theta**	May 20, 1950 – 1979, 1987	University of Toledo	Toledo, Ohio	Active	
Delta Iota	1950–2019	Northwestern University	Evanston, Illinois	Inactive	
**Delta Kappa**	1951–2018, 2021	Ball State University	Muncie, Indiana	Colony	(Note: Chapter reformed as a colony in 2021.)
Delta Lambda	1951–1961	Colorado School of Mines	Golden, Colorado	Inactive	
**Delta Mu**	May 19, 1951 – 1964, 1989	University of Texas	Austin, Texas	Active	
Delta Nu	1951–1986	University of Vermont	Burlington, Vermont	Inactive	
Delta Xi	1952–2010	Valparaiso University	Valparaiso, Indiana	Inactive	
Delta Omicron	1952–2002	Gettysburg College	Gettysburg, Pennsylvania	Inactive	
**Delta Pi**	May 3, 1952 – 2005, 2013	Indiana State University	Terre Haute, Indiana	Active	
**Delta Rho**	May 17, 1952 – 2015, 2020	North Carolina State University	Raleigh, North Carolina	Active	
Delta Sigma	1952–1997	Clarkson University	Potsdam, New York	Inactive	
Delta Tau	1953–1971, 1987–2006	Kent State University	Kent, Ohio	Inactive	
**Delta Upsilon**	May 16, 1953 – 2015, 2020	Arizona State University	Tempe, Arizona	Active	
**Delta Phi**	May 8, 1954 – 2000, 2007–2019, November 18, 2023	University of North Texas	Denton, Texas	Active	
Delta Chi	1954–2010	Lenoir–Rhyne University	Hickory, North Carolina	Inactive	
**Delta Psi**	May 22, 1954 – 1973, 1982	University of Kansas	Lawrence, Kansas	Active	
**Delta Omega**	November 13, 1954	Ripon College	Ripon, Wisconsin	Active	
Epsilon Alpha	1954–2011	High Point University	High Point, North Carolina	Inactive	
Epsilon Beta	1955–1998	Lycoming College	Williamsport, Pennsylvania	Inactive	
Epsilon Gamma	April 28, 1956 – 2024	Widener University	Chester, Pennsylvania	Inactive	
**Epsilon Delta**	May 12, 1956 – 2010, 2018	Youngstown State University	Youngstown, Ohio	Active	
Epsilon Epsilon				Unassigned	
**Epsilon Zeta**	May 4, 1957 – 1992, 2002	University of Tampa	Tampa, Florida	Active	
**Epsilon Eta**	November 2, 1957 – 2011, 2016	Indiana University of Pennsylvania	Indiana County, Pennsylvania	Active	
**Epsilon Theta**	September 21, 1957	Tufts University		Active	
**Epsilon Iota**	March 15, 1958 – 1973, 1988	East Carolina University	Greenville, North Carolina	Active	
**Epsilon Kappa**	January 31, 1959 – 1997, 2002	University of Idaho	Moscow, Idaho	Active	
Epsilon Lambda	1959–1971	Lewis & Clark College	Portland, Oregon	Inactive	
**Epsilon Mu**	May 21, 1960 – 1994, 2017	Eastern Michigan University	Ypsilanti, Michigan	Active	
Epsilon Nu	1960–1975	California State University, Los Angeles	Los Angeles, California	Inactive	
Epsilon Xi	1960–2004	Clarion University	Clarion, Pennsylvania	Inactive	
Epsilon Omicron	1960–1992	Waynesburg University	Waynesburg, Pennsylvania	Inactive	(Note: This chapter had its origination in Theta Psi Omega (local), formed in 1912. It became the Delta chapter of Phi Lambda Theta in 1927, but that national dissolved about a decade later. The chapter joined ΚΣΚ as its Lambda chapter in 1941. After 18 years in ΚΣΚ, it withdrew, again as a local, with a temporary name of ΚΦΝ, then joined ΘΧ as its Epsilon Omicron chapter.)
Epsilon Pi	1961–1991	Northern Illinois University	DeKalb, Illinois	Inactive	
**Epsilon Rho**	May 6, 1961 – 1990, 2018	Rider University	Lawrence Township, New Jersey	Active	
**Epsilon Sigma**	May 7, 1961	Wagner College	Staten Island, New York	Active	
**Epsilon Tau**	May 20, 1961 – 2001, 2009	Stephen F. Austin State University	Nacogdoches, Texas	Active	
Epsilon Upsilon	1962–2001	Central Michigan University	Mount Pleasant, Michigan	Inactive	
**Epsilon Phi**	December 8, 1962	University of Central Missouri	Warrensburg, Missouri	Active	
Epsilon Chi	1963–1974	Missouri University of Science and Technology	Rolla, Missouri	Inactive	
**Epsilon Psi**	December 8, 1963	New Jersey Institute of Technology	Newark, New Jersey	Active	
Epsilon Omega	1964–1975, 1990–2007	California State University, Sacramento	Sacramento, California	Inactive	
**Zeta Alpha**	July 11, 1964 – 1989, 2018	Slippery Rock University	Slippery Rock, Pennsylvania	Active	
**Zeta Beta**	October 24, 1964	Adrian College	Adrian, Michigan	Active	
**Zeta Gamma**	February 20, 1965	University of Alberta	Alberta, Canada	Active	
Zeta Delta	1965–2011	St. Cloud State University	St. Cloud, Minnesota	Inactive	
**Zeta Epsilon**	May 8, 1965	California State University, Long Beach	Long Beach, California	Active	
Zeta Zeta				Unassigned	
Zeta Eta	1965–1986	Northern Michigan University	Marquette, Michigan	Inactive	
Zeta Theta	1966–1985	Troy University	Troy, Alabama	Inactive	
Zeta Iota	1966–1983	Dickinson State University	Dickinson, North Dakota	Inactive	
**Zeta Kappa**	May 14, 1966	Ohio Northern University	Ada, Ohio	Active	
**Zeta Lambda**	May 15, 1966	Westminster College	New Wilmington, Pennsylvania	Active	
Zeta Mu	1966–1973	American International College	Springfield, Massachusetts	Inactive	
Zeta Nu	1967–1973	Parsons College	Fairfield, Iowa	Inactive	(Note: Chapter went defunct when the school closed in 1973.)
**Zeta Xi**	November 19, 1967	University of California, Davis	Davis, California	Active	
**Zeta Omicron**	February 10, 1968 – 1989, 2019	Shippensburg University	Shippensburg, Pennsylvania	Active	
**Zeta Pi**	April 27, 1968	Old Dominion University	Norfolk, Virginia	Active	
**Zeta Rho**	May 11, 1968 – 1990, December 2011	University of Kentucky	Lexington, Kentucky	Active	
**Zeta Sigma**	June 1, 1968	University of Wisconsin–River Falls	River Falls, Wisconsin	Active	
**Zeta Tau**	May 17, 1969 – 1973, 1991	University of Michigan–Flint	Flint, Michigan	Active	
**Zeta Upsilon**	May 24, 1969 – March 1972, 1986	University of Hartford	West Hartford, Connecticut	Active	(Note: Chapter formed by absorbing Beta Sigma Gamma (local), established in 1965.)
**Zeta Phi**	November 2, 1969 – 1993, 2000	California Polytechnic State University	San Luis Obispo County, California	Active	
Zeta Chi	1970–1973	Bryant University	Smithfield, Rhode Island	Inactive	
**Zeta Psi**	April 18, 1970 – 2000, 2014	Western Illinois University	Macomb, Illinois	Active	
**Zeta Omega**	1970–2005	West Chester University	West Chester, Pennsylvania	Colony	(Note: Chapter reformed as a colony in 2024.)
**Eta Alpha**	September 19, 1970 – 2001, 2010, 2018	Clemson University	Clemson, South Carolina	Active	
**Eta Beta**	April 10, 1971	Eastern Kentucky University	Richmond, Kentucky	Active	
**Eta Gamma**	April 10, 1971	Morehead State University	Morehead, Kentucky	Active	
**Eta Delta**	1971–2013, April 12, 2025	Babson College	Wellesley, Massachusetts	Active	
Eta Epsilon	1971–1973	Marquette University	Milwaukee, Wisconsin	Inactive	
**Eta Zeta**	1971–2015	Edinboro University	Edinboro, Pennsylvania	Colony	
Eta Eta				Unassigned	
Eta Theta	1972–1985	Chadron State College	Chadron, Nebraska	Inactive	
**Eta Iota**	February 12, 1972	Newberry College	Newberry, South Carolina	Active	
**Eta Kappa**	April 8, 1972 – 1989, 1995	James Madison University	Harrisonburg, Virginia	Active	
**Eta Lambda**	March 25, 1972	Virginia Tech	Blacksburg, Virginia	Active	
**Eta Mu**	May 20, 1972	University of Findlay	Findlay, Ohio	Active	
Eta Nu	1973–2020	Alma College	Alma, Michigan	Inactive	
Eta Xi	1973–1991	Tarkio College	Tarkio, Missouri	Inactive	(Note: The school closed in 1992.)
**Eta Omicron**	October 13, 1973	Northwestern State University	Natchitoches, Louisiana	Active	
**Eta Pi**	May 11, 1974	East Stroudsburg University	East Stroudsburg, Pennsylvania	Active	
Eta Rho	1977–2016	Centenary College of Louisiana	Shreveport, Louisiana	Inactive	
Eta Sigma	1977–1997	Arkansas Tech University	Russellville, Arkansas	Inactive	
**Eta Tau**	October 27, 1979	California State University, Stanislaus	Turlock, California	Active	
**Eta Upsilon**	April 23, 1980 – 1993, 2014	Texas A&M University	College Station, Texas	Active	
**Eta Phi**	May 2, 1981	Oakland University	Oakland County, Michigan	Active	
**Eta Chi**	1982	George Mason University	Fairfax, Virginia	Active	
**Eta Psi**	May 15, 1982 – 2000, 2012	University of Alabama at Birmingham	Birmingham, Alabama	Active	
**Eta Omega**	November 13, 1982	California State University, Chico	Chico, California	Active	
Theta Alpha	1984–1994	California State University, Northridge	Los Angeles, California	Inactive	
Theta Beta	1986–1998	The College of New Jersey	Ewing, New Jersey	Inactive	
Theta Gamma	1988–1995	Northwood University	Midland, Michigan	Inactive	
Theta Delta	1986–2001, 2018–2022	Santa Clara University	Santa Clara, California	Inactive	
**Theta Epsilon**	November 21, 1987	Kennesaw State University	Cobb County, Georgia	Active	
Theta Zeta	1988–2007	University of North Carolina at Asheville	Asheville, North Carolina	Inactive	
**Theta Eta**	May 13, 1989	Sam Houston State University	Huntsville, Texas	Active	
Theta Theta				Unassigned	
Theta Iota	1989–2019	University of California, Santa Cruz	Santa Cruz, California	Inactive	
**Theta Kappa**	April 7, 1990	Texas Tech University	Lubbock, Texas	Active	
Theta Lambda	1990–1997	Bloomsburg University	Bloomsburg, Pennsylvania	Inactive	
Theta Mu	1990–2003	California State University, East Bay	Hayward, California	Inactive	
**Theta Nu**	April 6, 1991 – 2008, 2021	Rowan University	Glassboro, New Jersey	Active	
Theta Xi	1991–2025	Virginia Commonwealth University	Richmond, Virginia	Inactive	
Theta Omicron	1992–2013	Mars Hill University	Mars Hill, North Carolina	Inactive	
Theta Pi	1992–1999	Bridgewater State University	Bridgewater, Massachusetts	Inactive	
**Theta Rho**	April 25, 1993	McNeese State University	Lake Charles, Louisiana	Active	
Theta Sigma	1994–2005	University of California, Santa Barbara	Santa Barbara, California	Inactive	
**Theta Tau**	April 9, 1994 – 2004, 2016–2021, November 16, 2025 (Colony)	Western Michigan	Kalamazoo, Michigan	Active	
Theta Upsilon	1994–1995	Frostburg State University	Frostburg, Maryland	Inactive	
Theta Phi	1994–2010	California State University, Bakersfield	Bakersfield, California	Inactive	
**Theta Chi**	1990	Grand Chapter Honorary		Active	(Note: The Theta Chi chapter is an honorary chapter, whose members are people not previously initiated into the fraternity, but who have served the fraternity)
Theta Psi	1996–2009	University of Wisconsin–Oshkosh	Oshkosh, Wisconsin	Inactive	
**Theta Omega**	November 16, 1996	Appalachian State University	Boone, North Carolina	Active	
**Iota Alpha**	1999–2007, 2021	University of North Carolina Wilmington	Wilmington, North Carolina	Active	
**Iota Beta**	November 13, 1999	Missouri State University	Springfield, Missouri	Active	
**Iota Gamma**	April 29, 2000	Grand Valley State University	Allendale, Michigan	Active	
**Iota Delta**	November 11, 2000	Southeastern Louisiana University	Hammond, Louisiana	Active	
Iota Epsilon	2001–2009	Georgia State University	Atlanta, Georgia	Inactive	
**Iota Zeta**	November 17, 2001	Radford University	Radford, Virginia	Active	
**Iota Eta**	April 23, 2005	University of the Pacific	Stockton, California	Active	
**Iota Theta**	April 1, 2006	University of Central Florida	Orlando, Florida	Active	
Iota Iota				Unassigned	
**Iota Kappa**	October 21, 2006	Northern Arizona University	Flagstaff, Arizona	Active	
**Iota Lambda**	April 21, 2007	Longwood University	Farmville, Virginia	Active	
**Iota Mu**	April 18, 2009	University of Missouri	Columbia, Missouri	Active	
Iota Nu	2010–2020	University of South Florida	Tampa, Florida	Inactive	
**Iota Xi**	April 9, 2011	Georgia College & State University	Milledgeville, Georgia	Active	
**Iota Omicron**	April 14, 2012	Florida International University	Miami, Florida	Active	
Iota Pi	2012–2024	Louisiana State University	Baton Rouge, Louisiana	Inactive	
Iota Rho	2013–2015	Southern Polytechnic State University	Marietta, Georgia	Inactive	(Note: Chapter closed when SPSU merged with Kennesaw State.)
**Iota Sigma**	April 27, 2013	Towson University	Towson, Maryland	Active	
**Iota Tau**	November 9, 2013	Northern Kentucky University	Highland Heights, Kentucky	Active	
**Iota Upsilon**	May 31, 2014	Texas State University	San Marcos, Texas	Active	
**Iota Phi**	May 2, 2015	University of South Carolina	Columbia, South Carolina	Active	
Iota Chi	2015–2021	Binghamton University	Binghamton, New York	Inactive	
**Iota Psi**	April 25, 2015	Rochester Institute of Technology	Rochester, New York	Active	
**Iota Omega**	2015	State University of New York at Cortland	Cortland, New York	Active	
Kappa Alpha	2015–2023	Gonzaga University	Spokane, Washington	Inactive	
Kappa Beta	2016–2022	LIU Post	Brookville, New York	Inactive	
**Kappa Gamma**	April 9, 2016	University of North Florida	Jacksonville, Florida	Active	
**Kappa Delta**	April 23, 2016	University of Texas at El Paso	El Paso, Texas	Active	
**Kappa Epsilon**	March 25, 2017	State University of New York at Oswego	Oswego, New York	Active	
**Kappa Zeta**	2017	University of Arkansas	Fayetteville, Arkansas	Active	
**Kappa Eta**	March 10, 2018	Salisbury University	Salisbury, Maryland	Active	
**Kappa Theta**	April 22, 2018	State University of New York at Geneseo	Geneseo, New York	Active	
Kappa Iota	2018–2024	U.S. Military Academy	West Point, New York	Inactive	
Kappa Kappa				Unassigned	
**Kappa Lambda**	March 23, 2019	California State University, San Marcos	San Marcos, California	Active	
Kappa Mu	2019–2021	Point Loma Nazarene University	San Diego County, California	Inactive	
**Kappa Nu**	August 29, 2020	University of Colorado	Boulder, Colorado	Active	
**Kappa Xi**	September 5, 2020	University at Albany	Albany, New York	Active	
**Kappa Omicron**	October 17, 2020	University of Tennessee	Knoxville, Tennessee	Active	
**Kappa Pi**	May 7, 2022	Boston University	Boston, Massachusetts	Active	
**Kappa Rho**	April 7, 2025	Florida Atlantic University	Boca Raton, Florida	Active	
		York University	Toronto, Ontario, Canada	Colony	(Note: Colony formed 2022.)
