= Chi Tau (disambiguation) =

Chi Tau is a defunct regional fraternity, formed at Duke University

Chi Tau may also refer to:

- Chi Tau (local), a local fraternity at Chico State University

== See also ==
- Chi Tauri, the name of a star system in the constellation of Taurus
- Chitauri, a fictional race of aliens appearing in Marvel Comics
