= Matthew Carrington =

Matthew Carrington may refer to:

- Matthew Carrington (student) (1983–2005), a student at California State University, Chico, whose death during a hazing incident prompted Matt's Law
- Matthew Carrington, Baron Carrington of Fulham (born 1947), British politician and MP for Fulham
