= The Orion (California State University, Chico) =

The Orion is the student newspaper of California State University, Chico and produces 32 issues every year, 16 each semester. Its offices are in the basement of Plumas Hall on the Chico State campus. It has won numerous state and national awards, including several National Pacemakers. Its name is taken from the constellation Orion, as the newspaper is meant to be a "hunter of truth."

== History ==
The Orion's first issue was published March 12, 1975. The offices were in the basement of Meriam Library. The newspaper was eight pages long and in tabloid format. There was another student paper on campus, The Wildcat, which was funded by the Associated Students.

Because of frequent conflicts, The Wildcat removed itself from the campus in 1977, leaving The Orion as Chico State's only student newspaper. Today, The Wildcat is known as the Chico News & Review.

The Orion moved from the Meriam Library basement to the Plumas Hall basement in the mid-1980s. The Orion won its first National Newspaper Pacemaker Award in 1989.

== Operation ==
After years operating as a primarily print publication, The Orion has shifted its focus to online content distribution. It does, however, publish occasional print issues during most semesters. The print publication has been distributed both in broadsheet and tabloid formats.

Editorial content (and the paper overall) is headed by the editor in chief and the managing editor.

In editorial content, there are four specific departments, covering different types of events: news, opinion, sports and features. Each section is headed by an editor, who oversees a staff of reporters.

== Awards ==
Numerous state and national awards have been won by The Orion over the years. A partial list includes:

- Associated Collegiate Press National Newspaper Pacemaker Award: 1988–89, 1992–93, 1994–95, 1995–96, 1996–97, 1998–99, 2002–03, 2003–04, 2004–05, 2009.
- Associated Collegiate Press National Newspaper of the Year: 1998, 1999, 2001, 2002, 2003.
- Associated Collegiate Press National Convention Best of Show: 2004, 2005, 2008, 2009, 2012.
- California Newspaper Publishers Association Best University Newspaper: 1994, 1995, 1996, 1997, 1998, 1999, 2000, 2001, 2004, 2008.
- Society of Professional Journalists Mark of Excellence Award National Winner: 2000, 2004.

On October 29, 2005, The Orion was inducted into the Associated Collegiate Press Hall of Fame.
