= MA program in Transatlantic Studies, Jagiellonian University =

The MA Program in Transatlantic Studies at Jagiellonian University, is a full-time, interdisciplinary graduate program in Kraków, Poland, geared predominantly towards international students. Students pursuing their Master of Arts focus mainly on the relationships between North America and Europe. This program, which began in 2007, offers an innovative approach to international affairs at one of Central Europe's oldest institutions. The two-year plan of study includes three semesters of in-classroom education and a fourth semester for a thesis defense. Students are able to choose from a wide array of courses covering the synergy between culture, politics, international relations, history, and economics. The program is commonly referred to as "TAS" and uses English as the only language of instruction. Graduates of the program receive a diploma in cultural studies with major in transatlantic studies and are accredited according to the international Bologna Process (European Credit Transfer System) with 120 ECTS points.

== Faculty and staff ==
The program is directed by Dr. Łukasz Kamieński. Current faculty members include Professor Patrick Vaughan, Prof UJ Garry Robson, Professor Grzegorz Babiński, Professor Michał Chorośnicki, Dr. Magdalena Góra, Dr. Paweł Laidler, Professor Andrzej Mania, Mark Nowakowski, Michał Oleszczyk, Dr. Magdalena Paluszkiewicz-Misiaczek, Dr. Jolanta Perek-Białas, Professor Dorota Praszałowicz, Dr. Christopher Reeves, Dr. Radosław Rybkowski, Dr. David Skully, Dr. Katarzyna Spiechlanin, Dr. Jolanta Szymkowska-Bartyzel, Professor Adam Walaszek, and Dr. Łukasz Wordliczek. Iwona Waga serves as the program's administrative assistant.

== Location ==
All courses are held at the Institute for American Studies and Polish Disapora's Chair of American Studies on Krakow's Rynek Głowny, number 34. Offices and classrooms are on the second floor, with a library on the third.

== See also ==
Jagiellonian University
