= Jane Wells Shurmer =

American educator

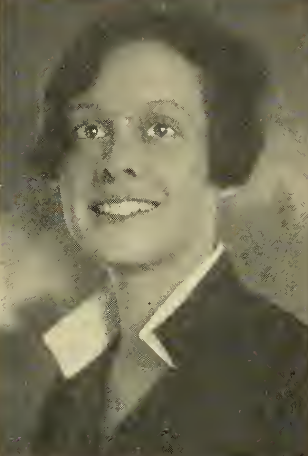
- Jane Wells Shurmer, from the 1927 yearbook of Wellesley College
- Born: October 24, 1906; Cleveland, Ohio
- Died: November 15, 1989 (aged 83); Lincoln City, Oregon
- Occupations: Educator, athletics coach

Jane Wells Shurmer (October 24, 1906 – November 15, 1989) was an American educator and college athletics coach. From 1938 to 1968 she taught physical education at California State University, Chico (CSU Chico), and developed competitive women's intercollegiate teams in several sports.

== Early life and education ==
Shurmer was born in Cleveland, Ohio, the daughter of Edward Shurmer and Ethelind Crawford Shurmer. She earned a bachelor's degree in 1927 at Wellesley College, where she played baseball and basketball. She completed a master's degree at the University of California in 1937, with a thesis titled "A study of the physical maturation of girls during adolescence".

== Career ==
Shurmer taught at the University of Iowa and University of Pittsburgh early in her career. From 1938 to 1968 she taught physical education at California State University, Chico (CSU Chico), except while she was serving with the WAVES during World War II.

As head of the women's physical education department at CSU Chico, she built the women's sports teams at CSU Chico, developing competitive teams in field hockey, badminton, basketball, softball, archery and swimming. She became an accredited field hockey official in 1930. She was honored in 1958 by the American Association of Health, Physical Education, and Recreation, for her efforts to elevate women's collegiate sports. She led a West Coast women's field hockey team on a tour of Australia and New Zealand in 1965, sponsored by the U.S. State Department and the U.S. Field Hockey Association. In 1966, CSU Chico named her a "distinguished professor". She retired from the university in 1968. In 1973, she was inducted into the Chico Sports Hall of Fame.

== Personal life and legacy ==
Shurmer retired to Lincoln City, Oregon, in 1968, and died there in 1989, at the age of 83. Shurmer Gymnasium at CSU Chico was named in her honor in 1976. The Jane Shurmer and Lola Story Scholarship at CSU Chico is also named partly in her memory, and supports students who are pursuing teaching credentials in physical education.
