= Gerald Scherba =

American biologist

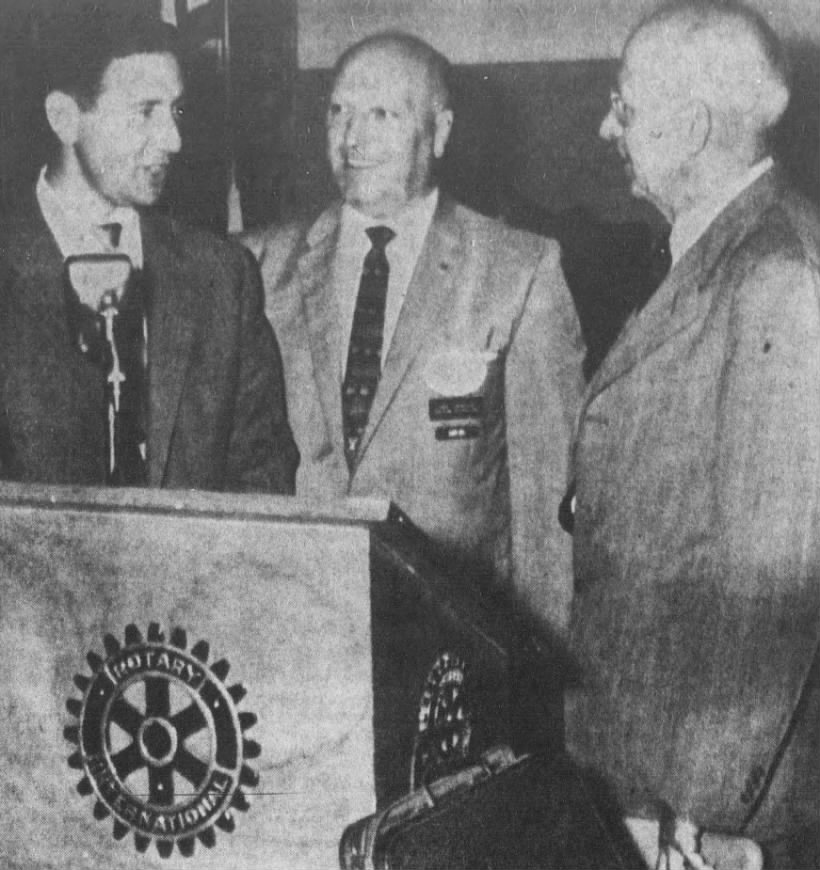
- Scherba (left) with Perry Codington and Bob Hurst, 1959
- Born: Gerald Marron Scherba; February 9, 1927; Chicago, Illinois, U.S.
- Died: February 5, 2001 (aged 73)
- Education: University of Chicago
- Occupation: Biologist
- Spouse: Carole Matthews (m. 1951)

Gerald Marron Scherba (February 9, 1927 – February 5, 2001) was an American biologist.

== Life and career ==
Scherba was born in Chicago, Illinois, the son of Harry Scherba. He attended the University of Chicago, earning his BS degree in biology in 1950, his MS degree in 1952 and his PhD degree in 1955.

Scherba served as an associate professor in the department of biology at California State University, Chico from 1955 to 1962. He then served as a professor in the department of natural sciences at California State University, San Bernardino from 1962 to 1984. During his years as a professor, in 1963, he was named a fellow of the American Association for the Advancement of Science.

== Death ==
Scherba died of congestive heart failure on February 5, 2001, at the age of 73.
