= Chi Tau =

American college fraternity (1920–1929)

- ΧΤ
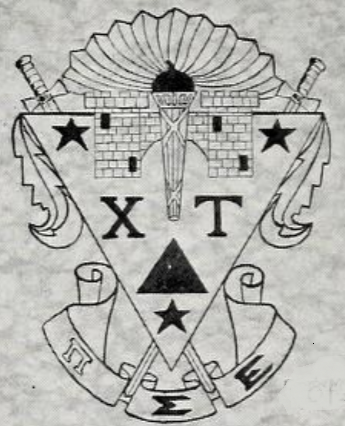
- Founded: October 3, 1920; 106 years ago Trinity College
- Type: Social
- Affiliation: Independent
- Status: Defunct
- Defunct date: 1929
- Scope: National
- Motto: Esse Quam Videri
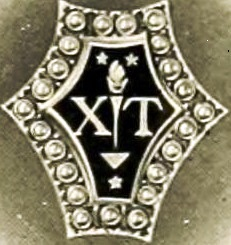
- Member badge
- Colors: White, Crimson and Gold
- Symbol: Torch, triangle, three stars
- Flower: White, yellow and red rose buds
- Publication: Ex Tee
- Chapters: 9
- Headquarters: United States

Chi Tau (ΧΤ) was an American men's fraternity. It was founded on October 3, 1920, in Durham, North Carolina, at Trinity College, the predecessor to Duke University. The majority of its nine chapters were in North Carolina. It disbanded at the start of the Great Depression, with members and chapters dispersing by 1929. At least two chapters lingered as independent organizations for several years.

== History ==
Chi Tau men's fraternity was founded at Trinity College in Durham, North Carolina, now known as Duke University, on October 3, 1920. Its purpose was for "fostering good fellowship and understanding among its members and acting the role of a mutual benefit society for its members in scholastic and extra-curricular activities." Its founders were Henry Belk, Merrimon Teague Hipps, Samuel L. Holton Jr., and Numa Francis Wilkerson. The group existed as a local for almost three years.

On May 2, 1923, Chi Tau met in Durham with Lambda Sigma Delta, a similar society at North Carolina State College. The two groups merged to form a new national fraternity under the name Chi Tau. Chi Tau was incorporated in North Carolina in 1923.

Additional chapters formed in 1923 at the University of North Carolina and Wake Forest College. These were followed by a chapter at the Presbyterian College of South Carolina in 1924. In 1925, chapters formed at the University of California, Columbia University, and Wofford College. It also established a chapter at the University of Illinois in 1927.

=== Demise ===
Chi Tau reported that internal dissension developed, and by 1929, the fraternity disintegrated without a national successor. But this oblique statement may not have captured the situation fully. In an article published marking the initiation of the former Chi Tau chapter at Wake Forest, the May 1940 Sigma Phi Epsilon journal notes that,

In 1924, the Alpha chapter disbanded. In quick succession, the other chapters followed suit until only two chapters were left--one here at Wake Forest and the other at the University of Illinois. Both lodges [~chapters] decided to go their own way as locals and to drop any idea of a revival of the national organization.

Writing about the period of disintegration after 1925, the authors appear unaware of the decision by apparently healthy Epsilon chapter at Presbyterian College to similarly seek a move to align with another national fraternity, Beta Kappa, in 1930. Additionally, contradicting the statement from Wake Forest, rather than meeting its demise in 1924 Alpha chapter continued its presence - according to Duke's yearbook, The Chanticleer - through 1928. In the 1929 edition, it was abruptly gone.

Once disbanded, the Iota chapter at the University of Illinois continued as a local chapter for three years. In 1933, it opted to merge into Phi Sigma Kappa's Alpha Deuteron chapter on that campus, expanding on friendships that had developed between the members. Another chapter, Delta at Wake Forest, continued into 1939 when it became a chapter of Sigma Phi Epsilon.

== Symbols ==
Chi Tau motto was the same as the State of North Carolina, Esse Quam Videri. (Note: In English, "To be, rather than to seem.")

Chi Tau's badge was a hexagon, taller from top to bottom, with the Greek letters "ΧΤ", a torch, a single triangle, and three stars. The fraternity's colors were white, crimson, and gold. Its flowers were white, red, and yellow rose buds.

For several years, the fraternity published a quarterly journal called the Ex Tee. One reference notes another publication called The Hexagon.

== Chapters ==
Following are the chapters of Chi Tau, with inactive chapters indicated in italics. Chapter closure dates reflect activity as a local organization, after the ending the national fraternity in 1929.

Chapter	Charter date and range	Institution	Location	Status	Ref.
Alpha	October 3, 1920 – 1933	Duke University	Durham, North Carolina	Inactive	(Note: Chapter formed at Trinity College, which became Duke University in 1924.) (Note: The Howler (yearbook) notes that the national fraternity disbanded one year after the Wake Forest College chapter, thus in 1924. Several dates in this reference are in opposition to Baird's' Manual. It seems reasonable to dismiss the earlier founding date here (claimed to be 1913, so thus at the time of publication this would have been at least six years before the creation of its former national!). But the yearbook goes on to state that this Wake Forest chapter, after a period of local, self-reliance (as a local named Chi Tau Delta), was positioning itself to merge into "one of the finer fraternal orders in the country for a charter." It is also reasonable to accept the installation date on this campus as factual.)
Beta	May 1923 – 1928	North Carolina State College of Agriculture and Engineering	Raleigh, North Carolina	Inactive	(Note: Chapter formed from Lambda Sigma Delta, established in 1922. When the chapter went inactive, at least five Beta chapter members became members of one of the other fraternities on campus after 1928, with no specific successor organization.)
Gamma	1923–1929	University of North Carolina	Chapel Hill, North Carolina	Inactive	
Delta	1923–1940	Wake Forest College	Wake Forest, North Carolina	Withdrew (ΣΦΕ)	(Note: Chapter formed from Alpha Gamma Sigma (local), established in 1920. It withdrew and became the NC Zeta chapter of Sigma Phi Epsilon.)
Epsilon	1924–1928	Presbyterian College of South Carolina	Clinton, South Carolina	Withdrew (ΒΚ)	(Note: Became the Alpha Eta chapter of Beta Kappa in 1930; it eventually became Theta Chi's Beta Psi chapter.)
Zeta	1925–1939	University of California	Berkeley, California	Inactive	(Note: Chapter formed from Alpha Beta Phi (local), established in 1921.)
Eta	1925–1929	Columbia University	New York City, New York	Inactive	
Theta	November 29, 1925 – 1929	Wofford College	Spartanburg, South Carolina	Inactive	(Note: Chapter formed from Phi Delta Tau (local), established in 1925.) (Note: Chi Tau had two pages in the 1927 and 1928 yearbook, but was not in the 1929 edition. In the years immediately following 1928, seniors who had been members did not list Chi Tau or any other social fraternity under their senior portraits.)
Iota	1927–1935	University of Illinois	Urbana, Illinois	Withdrew (ΦΣΚ)	(Note: Chapter formed from Delta Pi Epsilon (local), established in 1925. The chapter withdrew and joined the Alpha Deuteron chapter of Phi Sigma Kappa.)

A separate local fraternity, Chi Tau, was established at Chico State University in 1939. This was ten years after the demise of the original Chi Tau national. Any name similarity to the North Carolina-established group is a mere coincidence. (Note: This unaffiliated local is notorious for a 2005 hazing death on the Chico campus. See Chi Tau (local), accessed 8 Jun 2019.)
