= Patrick Vaughan =

American historian

Patrick Vaughan (born 1965) is a professor at Jagiellonian University in Kraków, Poland. He was the co-founder of the MA program in Transatlantic Studies, Jagiellonian University.

== Early life ==
Vaughan was born in Seattle, Washington. Vaughan's father was a member of Al Brightman's Seattle University nationally ranked basketball teams led by the “Gold Dust Twins” of Johnny and Ed O’Brien. In 1952 that team defeated the Harlem Globetrotters in what has been called the most memorable event in Seattle sports history. Vaughan's father missed that game due to military service and heard the news while serving on an aircraft carrier in the Pacific Ocean. His uncle Daniel Vaughan also served in the Navy during which he married Courtney Sprague, niece of F. Scott Fitzgerald and the daughter of Admiral Clifton Sprague, hero of the WW2 Battle off Samar, which the author of The Last Stand of the Tin Can Sailors has called "the greatest upset in the history of naval warfare".

Vaughan spent his childhood years in the small petroleum town of Oildale, California. In grade school the children's novels Escape from Warsaw and The Endless Steppe provided an early interest in the history of Poland. He gained an informal education listening stories told by Los Angeles sportscasters Vin Scully and Chick Hearn. Vaughan gained an early lesson in the power of positive thinking as a Little League catcher taking pitches from teammate Patrick Lencioni who in later years became a best-selling author in Silicon Valley. Vaughan's older sister could not compete because there were no girls' sports programs; she became an early Title IX pioneer and set a high-school girl's long-jump record that has stood for over forty years.

In 1980, Vaughan's father accepted a new job in a geothermal energy company north of San Francisco. In Santa Rosa, Vaughan became an All-Northern California selection on the first of Coach Tom Bon Figli's Cardinal Newman basketball teams.

He was recruited by Bill Trumbo and played summer league for Steve Patterson who was the UCLA center after Kareem Abdul-Jabbar and before Bill Walton. Patterson emphasized the teaching of John Wooden, especially the idea that college basketball is four years of your life-so you better know how to do something else.

Patrick Vaughan studied History and Business Organization at California State University, Chico. He hosted a popular morning show on the influential KCSC radio station. Spin magazine selected it as the best alternative radio station in the United States. KCSC was a cable station, allowing it a creative air play while serving as a midpoint for then-obscure bands such as the Smashing Pumpkins and Nirvana traveling between Seattle and San Francisco. KCSC staff member Amy Finnerty (host of the show after Vaughan) has been credited with successfully pushing Nirvana's "Smells Like Teen Spirit" video on MTV executives, helping to spark the popular grunge music era of the 1990s.

The writer Matt Olmstead hired Vaughan to write a weekly column for the university newspaper. That column achieved a popular campus following and was awarded for excellence by the California Intercollegiate Press Association. Olmstead went on to successful career as a Hollywood producer for Prison Break and NYPD Blue where he would insert Vaughan's name into his scripts. In one episode, Detective Andy Sipowicz (Dennis Franz) investigates an incident at Vaughan Construction and in another Detective Diane Russell (Kim Delaney) aggressively interrogates a suspect regarding the suspicious use of his alias “Pat Vaughan”.

== Career ==
Vaughan earned a PhD in modern European history at West Virginia University. At WVU Vaughan wrote a notable seminar paper that was awarded the John L. Snell Memorial Prize from the Southern Historical Association (awarded annually to the most outstanding original seminar research paper in European history). The paper examined the complex social-political aspects that led to the rise of Polish Solidarity in the late 1970s-and the specific role of national security adviser Zbigniew Brzezinski assisting underground movements behind the Iron Curtain and helping to deter a potential Soviet military invasion of Poland in the autumn of 1980.

The paper was published in The Polish Review and received attention beyond the academic world. Jan Nowak-Jeziorański, the former director of Radio Free Europe, praised the article in a speech in New York City before former U.S. ambassadors to Poland marking the ten year anniversary of the fall of the Berlin Wall. Nowak-Jeziorański argued Vaughan's article moved beyond the popular media narratives and effectively described the more nuanced elements in Eastern Europe that served to undermine the Soviet empire and help bring a peaceful end the Cold War in 1989.

Brzezinski wrote Vaughan a letter offering him access to his personal archives in Washington DC. “Over the weekend I had the opportunity to read the article in “The Polish Review” concerning my involvement in U.S. policy toward Eastern Europe” Brzezinski wrote. “I must most heartily congratulate you on it. You have done a truly remarkable job in ‘decoding’ my strategic intent and in analyzing the tactics that I pursued in order to attain my fundamental objectives.” He continued “I do not know the full scope of your ongoing research and your current PhD dissertation. To the extent that it focuses on my public activities, let me offer to you special access to my personal archives. I was so favorably impressed by the thoroughness of your scholarship and by your judicious analysis, that I would be happy also to give you personal access to pertinent sections of my personal diary [which heretofore has not been made available except as used selectively in my own memoirs].”

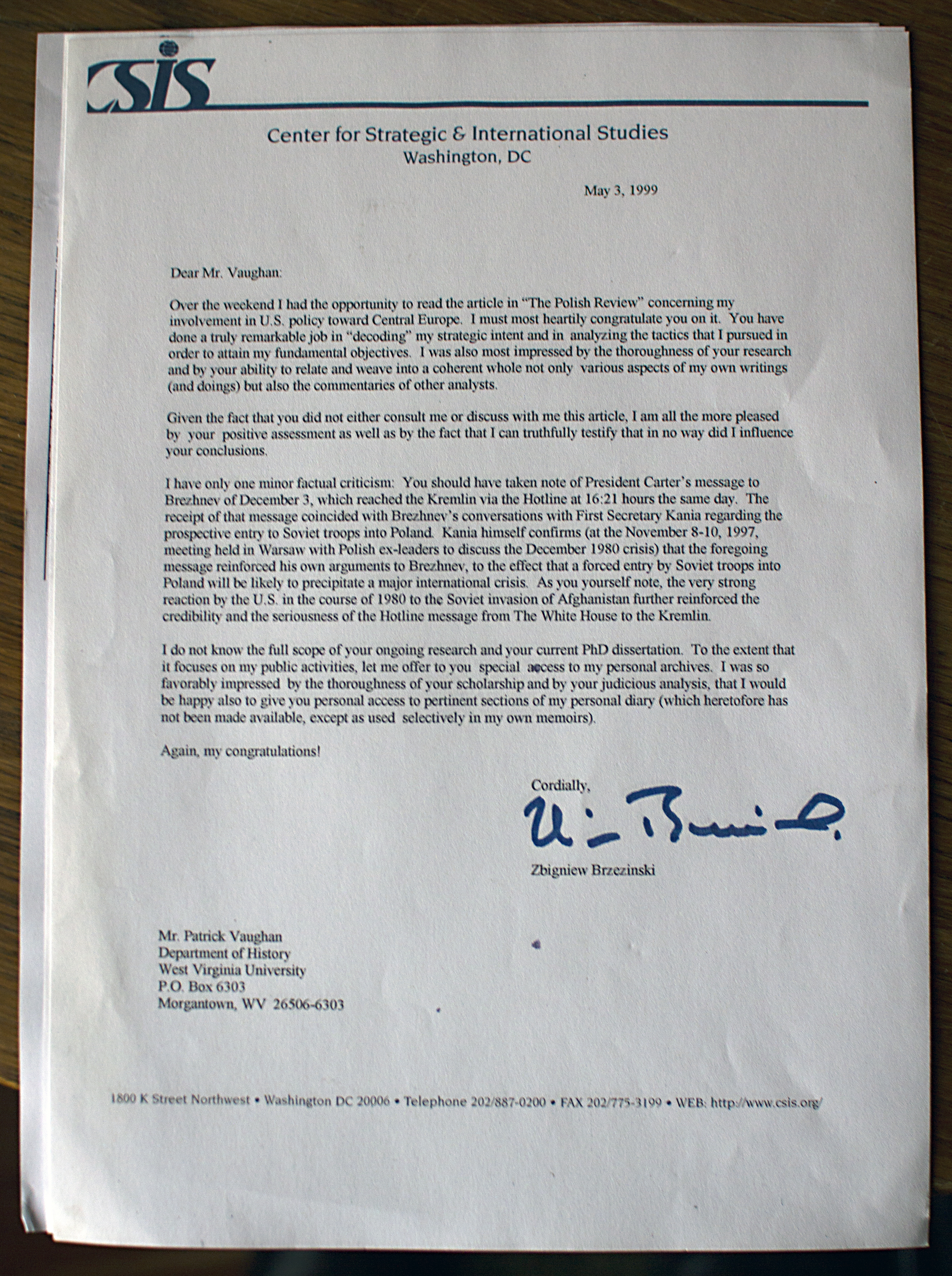
Original letter from Brzezinski

That PhD dissertation was honored in a ceremony at Boston University as the Polish Ambassador presented Vaughan with the Kazimierz Dzeiwanowski Award. Professor Thomas Gromada, director of the Polish Institute of Arts and Sciences of America, stated in a press release “Vaughan’s work will make a major contribution to the historiography of the Cold War by redefining Brzezinski’s place in it and in the public and controversial debates over the direction of U.S. foreign policy from the 1950s to the present.”

In 2010 Vaughan authored a strategic biography on Zbigniew Brzezinski that was nominated for the Kazimierz Moczarski Award as the outstanding work in Polish history. He discussed the book in interviews with Polish film critic Michal Oleszczyk in Tygodnik Powszechny and Magdalena Zakowska in Gazeta Wyborcza.

In 2013 Vaughan wrote a noteworthy chapter to Charles Gati's anthology Zbig: The Strategy of Statecraft of Zbigniew Brzezinski. The introduction was by Jimmy Carter and contributors included Washington Post columnist David Ignatius and historian Francis Fukuyama. “One of the most illuminating chapters written by Patrick Vaughan deals with the relationship between Brzezinski and Pope John Paul II,” wrote Vladimir Tismaneanu in a review of the book in London's International Affairs, “The two men shared a deep love for Polish history, consistent distrust of communist double-talk, and a vibrant sense of moral duty in favour of oppressed individuals.”

Vaughan received a Fulbright academic grant to Poland and later accepted a professorship at Jagiellonian University in Krakow. In 2007 Vaughan helped found the Trans-Atlantic Studies program at Jagiellonian University-his classes include the History of the Cold War, History of International Relations, Polish and Russian Literature, and Science Fiction and Social and Political Metaphor.

== Notes ==
Vaughan's grandmother was the first woman to ride in the Calgary Stampede. The Dutch-Polish stoner surfer band Los Santos Duderinos sampled Vaughan's voice from his “H Frame” YouTube channel for their soon-to-be released song "Pulse".
