= Transatlantic studies =

Transatlantic studies refers to the relatively recent educational discipline studying the economic, cultural, political, and social linkages between Atlantic countries, often the United States and Europe.

== Criticism ==
The scholarly tendency has been critiqued by some as an iteration of Eurocentrism, as Jeffrey Herlihy-Mera notes in "Transatlantic Approaches": "Engaging prefixes like multi-and trans-as a method to shift attention toward intellectual duality—that is, imagined connections between imagined communities—often repeats the marginalization of traditionally silenced peoples. We might describe the field of African, American, and European tracts as dedicated to a horizontalized cultural history—its fertilizations, exchanges, translations, contacts, and mixtures—but there is a looming danger of the subfields merging into an approach that results in the same dilemmas as other hyphens and prefixes."

== See also ==
- MA program in Transatlantic Studies, Jagiellonian University
