= Beta Kappa =

American collegiate fraternity (1901–1942)

- ΒΚ
- Founded: October 15, 1901; 125 years ago Hamline University
- Type: Social
- Former affiliation: NIC
- Status: Merged
- Merge date: April 14, 1942
- Successor: Theta Chi (Mostly)
- Scope: National
- Member badge
- Colors: Purple and Gold
- Symbol: Coiled serpent, Lamp, Crossed swords
- Flower: Yellow rose
- Publication: Beta Kappa Journal
- Chapters: 47
- Members: 6,000+ lifetime
- Headquarters: Saint Paul, Minnesota; United States

Beta Kappa (ΒΚ) was an American college fraternity that was founded in 1901 at Hamline University in Saint Paul, Minnesota. It established 47 chapters in the United States before merging with Theta Chi in 1942.

== History ==
Beta Kappa was formed at Hamline University in Saint Paul, Minnesota on October 15, 1901, with the name The Knights of Beta Omicron Sigma Kappa. Eventually, this somewhat unwieldy name was colloquially shortened to Beta Kappa, maturing into a local fraternity that continued for twenty-one years before beginning a period of rapid expansion. Its founders were Edward T. Marlatte, Daniel Paul Rader, Albert T. Spencer, and Charles H. Wallace. Beta Kappa was incorporated in 1912.

In 1922, the Beta chapter was established at the University of Washington. The fraternity's grand convention held its first meeting in 1923 in Saint Pail. The Gamma chapter was established at the Nebraska Wesleyan University in 1924.

The fraternity established a committee on expansion in 1925. In quick succession, Beta Kappa established 47 chapters with a total membership of over 5,000. An award cup was presented annually for the best chapter scholarship and national relations.

Beta Kappa became a junior member of the National Interfraternity Conference in 1926, and a full member in 1928. In 1929, it had initiated 2,173 members. Membership dropped during the Great Depression; by 1940, only 25 of its 47 chapters were still active. The start of World War II further weakened the fraternity with a reduction in membership. In 1942, it had 22 chapters. Beta Kappa's leadership decided to seek a merger with another national fraternity.

Beta Kappa merged with Theta Chi on April 14, 1942, with three exceptions released to join other national groups. The mother chapter at Hamline University was granted the chapter name, Beta Kappa chapter, to honor its rank as a former Alpha chapter. The merger added 6,000 members and seventeen new chapters to Theta Chi; two Beta Kappa chapters were merged into existing chapters.

== Symbols ==
Beta Kappa's badge was shaped like a diamond in black enamel, longer from top to bottom, with 24 pearls on its perimeter. It held a small, white circular disk in the center with a coiled serpent; above was a lamp, and below were two crossed swords. On the sides of the disk were the Greek letters "Β" and "Κ".

The fraternity's colors were purple and gold. Its flower was a yellow (golden) rose. It magazine was The Journal of Beta Kappa, established in 1924.

== Governance ==
Beta Kappa was governed by a grand convention that met biennially. At these annual meetings, the fraternity elected its grand executive council, consisting of seven members. The grand executive council oversaw operations between grand conventions. The first grand convention was held in 1923 in Saint Paul, followed by a meeting in 1925 in Saint Paul; a 1927 meeting in Cleveland, Ohio; and a 1929 meeting in Jamestown, New York.

In 1925, the fraternity established a national office in Oakland, California. It moved to Tucson, Arizona in 1927 and to Oxford, Ohio in 1929.

== Chapters ==
The chapters of Beta Kappa were as follows.

Chapter	Charter date and range	Institution	Location	Status	Ref.
Alpha	October 15, 1901 – April 15, 1942	Hamline University	Saint Paul, Minnesota	Merged (ΘΧ)	(Note: The chapter originated as Beta Omicron Sigma Kappa (local), remaining so for 21 years, when it became a national fraternity. It became the Beta Kappa chapter of Theta Chi with the national merger.)
Beta	1922–1936	University of Washington	Seattle, Washington	Inactive	
Gamma	1923–1933	Nebraska Wesleyan University	Lincoln, Nebraska	Inactive	(Note: Chapter formed from Sigma Gamma Xi (local), established in 1923.)
Delta	1924–1932	University of California	Berkeley, California	Inactive	(Note: Chapter formed from Oricum (local), established in 1921.)
Epsilon	1925 – April 15, 1942	Middlebury College	Middlebury, Vermont	Merged (ΘΧ)	(Note: Chapter formed from Chi Kappa Mu (local), established in 1921. At the dissolution of the small national Beta Psi in 1934, it gained additional members. It became the Beta Mu chapter of Theta Chi with the national merger.)
Zeta	1925 – April 15, 1942	University of Cincinnati	Cincinnati, Ohio	Merged (ΘΧ)	(Note: Chapter formed from Sigma Delta Pi (local), established in 1913. It became the Beta Omicron chapter of Theta Chi with the national merger.)
Eta	1925–1934	Bucknell University	Lewisburg, Pennsylvania	Inactive	(Note: Chapter formed from Phi Theta Sigma (local), established in 1920. It died out before the merger; an unaffiliated Theta Chi chapter was established on campus in 1947.)
Theta	1925–1934	Tufts University	Medford, Massachusetts	Inactive	(Note: Chapter formed from Beta Tau (local), established in 1920. It died out before the merger; a Theta Chi chapter was established on this campus in 1957, absorbing another local named Beta Chi (local).)
Iota	1925 – April 15, 1942	University of Nevada	Reno, Nevada	Merged (ΘΧ)	(Note: Chapter formed from Phi Gamma (local), established in 1922. It became the Beta Phi chapter of Theta Chi with the national merger.)
Kappa	1925 – April 15, 1942	University of Illinois	Champaign and Urbana, Illinois	Merged (ΘΧ)	(Note: Chapter formed from Alpha Phi Omega (local), established in 1920. In 1940, the chapter absorbed the Alpha chapter of Delta Alpha Epsilon, formed in 1923. It joined the Rho chapter of Theta Chi with the national merger.)
Lambda	1926 – April 15, 1942	Oregon State University	Corvallis, Oregon	Merged (ΘΧ)	(Note: Chapter formed from Theta Epsilon (local), established in 1919. It joined with the Sigma chapter of Theta Chi with the national merger.)
Mu	1926–1931	University of Wisconsin	Madison, Wisconsin	Inactive	(Note: Chapter formed from Beta Sigma Pi (local), established in 1924.)
Nu	1926–1934	Miami University	Oxford, Ohio	Inactive	(Note: Chapter formed from Alpha Delta Mu (local), established in 1925. It went inactive before the merger. An unrelated Theta Chi chapter was established on campus in 1948.)
Xi	1926	Allegheny College	Meadville, Pennsylvania	Merged (ΘΧ)	(Note: Chapter formed from Phi Alpha Kappa (local), established in 1922. It became the Beta Chi chapter of Theta Chi with the national merger.)
Omicron	1926–1935	University of Maine	Orono, Maine	Inactive	(Note: Chapter formed from Phi Omega Delta (local), established in 1923.)
Pi	1926 – April 15, 1942	Monmouth College	Monmouth, Illinois	Merged (ΘΧ)	(Note: Chapter formed from Xi Gamma Delta (local), established in 1915. It became the Beta Pi chapter of Theta Chi with the national merger.)
Rho	1926 – April 15, 1942	Illinois Wesleyan University	Bloomington, Illinois	Merged (ΘΧ)	(Note: Chapter formed from Pi Mu Epsilon (local), established in 1919. It became the Beta Rho chapter of Theta Chi with the national merger.)
Sigma	1927–1942	Auburn University	Auburn, Alabama	Withdrew (ΦΚΤ)	(Note: Chapter formed from Kappa Phi (local), established in 1921. With the national merger into Theta Chi, this chapter withdrew and became the Alpha Lambda chapter of Phi Kappa Tau .)
Tau	1927–1940	Pennsylvania State University	University Park, Pennsylvania	Inactive	(Note: Chapter formed from Delta Kappa Sigma (local), established in 1921.)
Upsilon	1927–1937	University of Denver	Denver, Colorado	Inactive	(Note: Chapter formed from Omicron Sigma (local)i, established in 1924.)
Phi	1927–1934	Boston University	Boston, Massachusetts	Inactive	(Note: Chapter formed from Psi Nu (local), established in 1920.)
Chi	1927–1933	University of Virginia	Charlottesville, Virginia	Inactive	(Note: Chapter formed from Alpha Phi Epsilon (local), established in 1921.)
Psi	1927 – April 15, 1942	Birmingham–Southern College	Birmingham, Alabama	Merged (ΘΧ)	(Note: Chapter formed from Kappa Alpha Chi (local), established in 1926. It became the Beta Xi chapter of Theta Chi with the national merger.)
Omega	1928–1935	University of Pennsylvania	Philadelphia, Pennsylvania	Inactive	(Note: Chapter formed from Phi Delta Tau (local), established in 1922.)
Alpha Alpha	1928–1935	Ohio State University	Columbus, Ohio	Inactive	(Note: Chapter formed from the Varsity Club (local), established in 1901.)
Alpha Beta	1928–1933	Wabash College	Crawfordsville, Indiana	Inactive	(Note: Chapter formed from Phi Sigma Alpha (local), established in 1914.)
Alpha Gamma	1929–1942	Georgia Tech	Atlanta, Georgia	Withdrew (ΛΧΑ)	(Note: Chapter formed from Chi Beta Sigma (local), established in 1927. With the national merger into Theta Chi, this chapter withdrew and became the Beta Kappa Zeta chapter of Gamma Chi Alpha.)
Alpha Delta	1929–1941	Mississippi State University	Starkville, Mississippi	Inactive	(Note: Chapter formed from Delta Sigma Tau (local), established in 1926.)
Alpha Epsilon	1929–1939	University of Arizona	Columbus, Ohio	Inactive	(Note: Chapter formed from Phi Gamma Psi (local), established in 1928.)
Alpha Zeta	1929 – April 15, 1942	University of Tennessee at Chattanooga	Chattanooga, Tennessee	Merged (ΘΧ)	(Note: Chapter formed from Chi Alpha Nu (local), established in 1925. It became the Gamma Alpha chapter of Theta Chi with the national merger.)
Alpha Eta	1930 – April 15, 1942	Presbyterian College	Clinton, South Carolina	Merged (ΘΧ)	(Note: Chapter formed from the Epsilon chapter of Chi Tau, established in 1924. It became the Beta Psi chapter of Theta Chi with the national merger.)
Alpha Theta	1930 – April 15, 1942	University of Southern California	Los Angeles, California	Merged (ΘΧ)	(Note: Chapter formed from Rho Alpha Sigma (local), established in 1927. It became the Beta Tau chapter of Theta Chi with the national merger.)
Alpha Iota	1930–1940	Denison University	Granville, Ohio	Inactive	(Note: Chapter formed from Phi Kappa Epsilon (local), established in 1926.)
Alpha Kappa	1930–1940	Utah State University	Logan, Utah	Inactive	(Note: Chapter formed from Omega Tau (local), established in 1922.)
Alpha Lambda	1930–1935	University of Florida	Gainesville, Florida	Inactive	(Note: Chapter formed from Pi Alpha Sigma (local), established in 1927.)
Alpha Mu	1931 – April 15, 1942	Furman University	Greenville, South Carolina	Merged (ΘΧ)	(Note: Chapter formed from Psi Chi (local), established in the 1920s. It became the Gamma Beta chapter of Theta Chi with the national merger.)
Alpha Nu	1931 – April 15, 1942	Case Western Reserve University	Cleveland, Ohio	Merged (ΘΧ)	(Note: Chapter formed from Sigma Tau Delta (local), established in 1909. It became the Beta Nu chapter of Theta Chi with the national merger.)
Alpha Xi	1932–1933	University of Utah	Salt Lake City, Utah	Inactive	(Note: Chapter formed from Psi Rho Lambda (local), established in 1926.)
Alpha Omicron	1933–1936	Hamilton College	Clinton, New York	Inactive	(Note: Chapter formed from Chi Beta Sigma (local), established in 1923.)
Alpha Pi	1934–1936	Cornell University	Ithaca, New York	Withdrew (ΑΤΩ)	(Note: Chapter formed from the Zodiac Club (local), established in 1904. The chapter withdrew and merged into Alpha Tau Omega.)
Alpha Rho	1934–1941	Western Colorado University	Gunnison, Colorado	Inactive	(Note: Chapter formed from Sigma Delta Phi (local), established in 1924. It died out before the merger. An unrelated Theta Chi chapter was charted on campus in 1947.)
Alpha Sigma	1934 – April 15, 1942	Lehigh University	Bethlehem, Pennsylvania	Merged (ΘΧ)	(Note: Chapter formed from Omega Sigma Phi (local), established in 1928. It became the Beta Sigma chapter of Theta Chi with the national merger.)
Alpha Tau	1935 – April 15, 1942	University of Akron	Akron, Ohio	Merged (ΘΧ)	(Note: Chapter formed from Chi Theta Tau (local), established in 1921. It became the Beta Lambda chapter of Theta Chi with the national merger.)
Alpha Upsilon	1935 – April 15, 1942	California State University, Fresno	Fresno, California	Merged (ΘΧ)	(Note: Chapter formed from Sigma Chi Alpha (local), established in 1921. It became the Beta Upsilon chapter of Theta Chi with the national merger.)
Alpha Gamma	1936–1942	Michigan State University	East Lansing, Michigan	Withdrew (ΣΧ)	(Note: Chapter formed from the Phylean Club (local), established in 1911. With the national merger into Theta Chi, this chapter withdrew and became the Gamma Psi chapter of Sigma Chi.)
Alpha Chi	1938–1941	Kansas State University	Manhattan, Kansas	Inactive	(Note: Chapter formed from the Beta chapter of Phi Lambda Theta, which was established in 1923.)
Alpha Psi	1938 – April 15, 1942	Susquehanna University	Fresno, California	Merged (ΘΧ)	(Note: Chapter formed from the Epsilon chapter of Phi Lambda Theta, established in 1928. It became the Beta Omega chapter of Theta Chi with the national merger.)

== Notable members ==
- Paul Rader, college football coach and president of the Christian and Missionary Alliance

== See also ==
- Theta Chi
- List of social fraternities
