= California State University, Chico =

Public university in Chico, California

- Former names: Northern Branch State Normal School of California (1887–1921); Chico State Teachers College (1921–1935); Chico State College (1935–1972)
- Motto: "Today Decides Tomorrow"
- Type: Public university
- Established: 1887; 139 years ago
- Parent institution: California State University
- Accreditation: WSCUC
- Endowment: $97.9 million (2024)
- Budget: $261.8 million (2024-25)
- President: Stephen Perez
- Provost: Leslie Cornick
- Faculty: 848 (Fall 2024)
- Administrative staff: 1,061 (Fall 2024)
- Students: 14,581 (Fall 2024)
- Undergraduates: 13,392 (Fall 2024)
- Postgraduates: 1,189 (Fall 2024)
- Location: Chico, California, United States; 39°43′48″N 121°50′51″W
- Campus: Central Campus: 119 acres (48 ha) Total: 3,249 acres (1,315 ha); Midsize city
- Newspaper: The Orion
- Colors: Chico red, cornerstone gray, black, and white
- Nickname: Wildcats
- Sporting affiliations: NCAA Division II – CCAA
- Mascot: Willie the Wildcat
- Website: www.csuchico.edu

California State University, Chico (Chico State) is a public university in Chico, California, United States. It was founded in 1887 as one of about 180 "normal schools" founded by state governments in the 19th century to train teachers for the rapidly growing public common schools. Some closed but most steadily expanded their role and became state colleges in the early 20th century and state universities in the late 20th century. It is the second oldest campus in the California State University system. As of the fall 2020 semester, the university had a total enrollment of 16,630 students. The university offers 126 bachelor's degree programs, 35 master's degree programs, and four types of teaching credentials. Chico is a Hispanic-Serving Institution (HSI).

== History ==
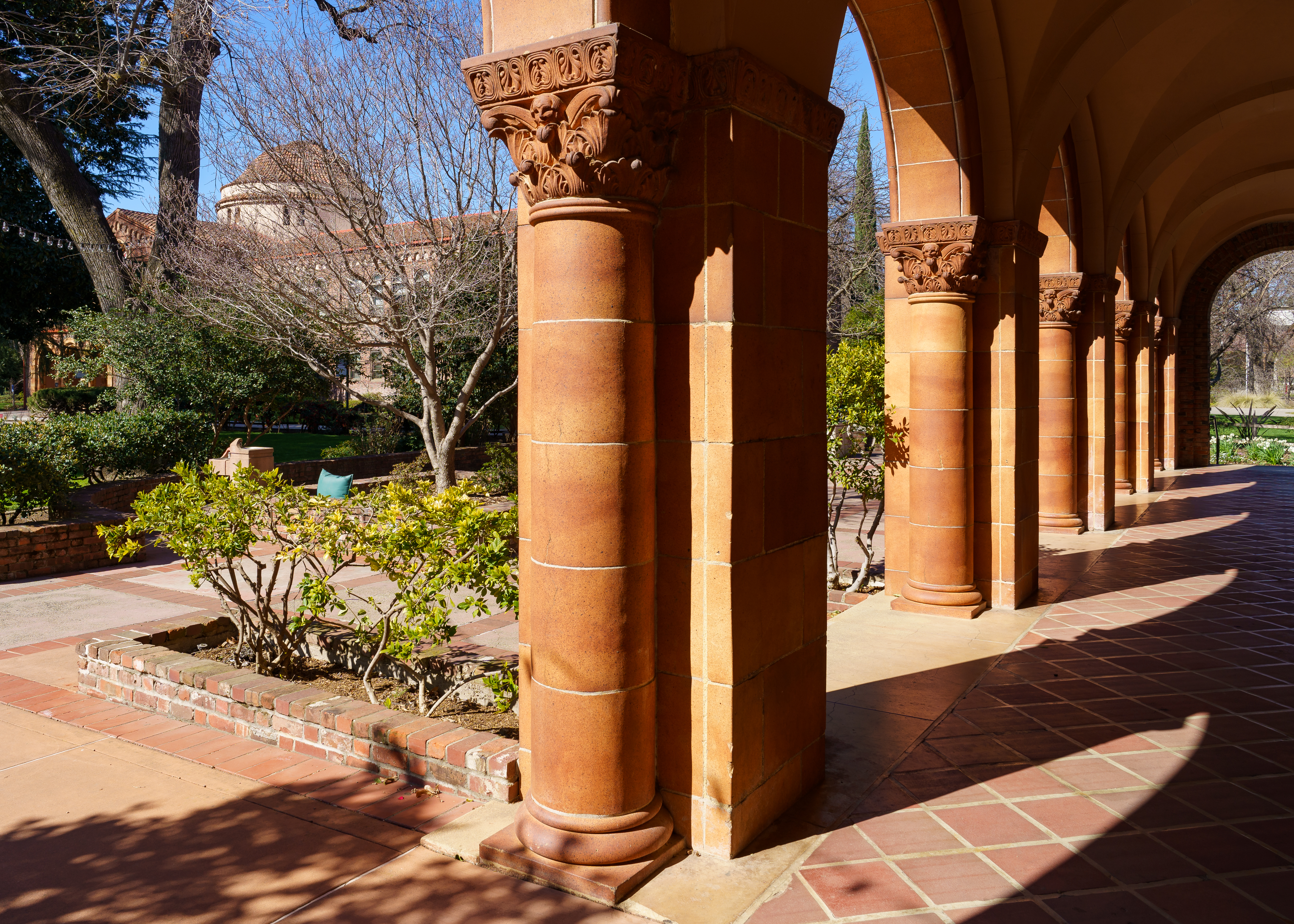
The historic campus of CSU Chico.

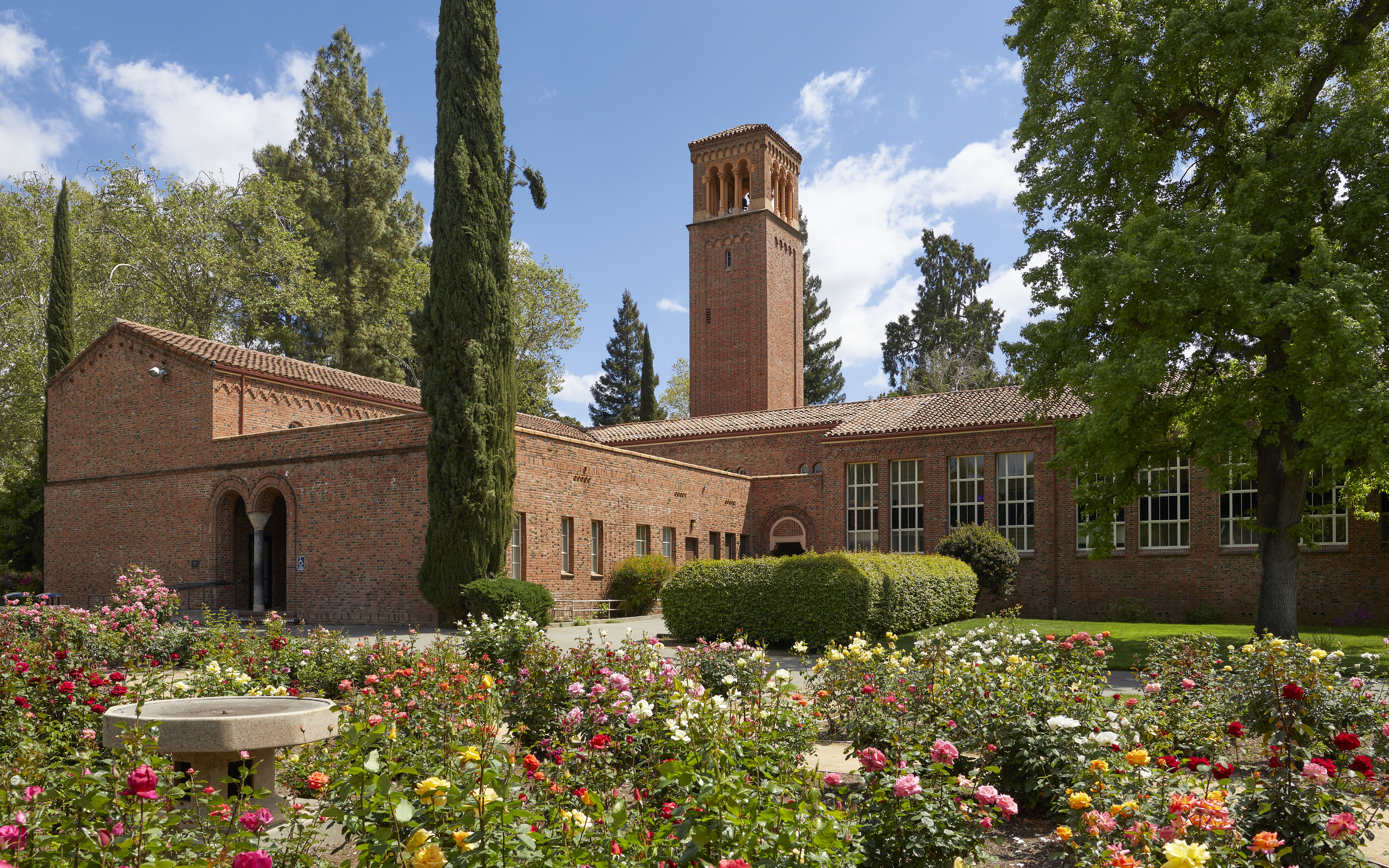
Trinity Hall as seen from George Petersen Rose Garden

On March 12, 1887, a legislative act was enacted to create the Northern Branch of the California State Normal School. Less than a month later, Chico was chosen as the location. In 1887, General John Bidwell donated 8 acres (3.2 ha) of land from his cherry orchard. On July 4, 1888, the first cornerstone was laid. On September 3, 1889, doors opened for the 90 enrolled students. The library opened on January 11, 1890, with 350 books. On June 20, 1891, the first graduation took place, a class of 15.

In 1910, Annie Kennedy Bidwell donated an additional 2 acres (0.81 ha) of land to be used for work with elementary agriculture. The next year Mrs. Bidwell donated an orange orchard lot 55 × 440 feet (130 m) as the children's playground, which is connected to the Training School. In 1921, legislation was enacted to change the school's name to Chico State Teacher's College. In 1922, Chico State Teacher's College added a junior college curriculum and awarded a certificate after two years. Also in 1922, Bidwell Mansion was turned into a women's dormitory. In 1923 the first college paper, The Collegian, was published. In 1924, the state Board of Education allowed the school to grant baccalaureate degrees. Also in 1924, the wildcat was chosen as the mascot. In 1927 a gym was built on the grounds of Bidwell Mansion. In 1929, the cornerstone for the new administration building was laid on top of Normal Building's original cornerstone.

In 1935, Bidwell Hall was turned into a recreation and student center—the first student union. Also in 1935 a legislative act changed the college name from Chico State Teachers College to Chico State College. In 1937 evening classes started on campus and athletic fields were purchased from the Chico Board of Education.

In 1948, dorms for 500 male students were set up on west side of Warner Street. The buildings were built during World War II and were used as bachelor quarters for a Marine Hospital in Klamath Falls, Oregon.

In 1950, California's governor allowed state colleges to grant Master of Arts degrees. In 1951 the college reorganized from 18 departments into seven divisions with chairmen. Then in 1956 a new flagpost and sign in front of Kendall Hall was donated by the class of 1956. In the following year, 1957, a new cafeteria was built and the rose gardens were planted. In 1958 the first "telecourse" was taught, Psychology 51.

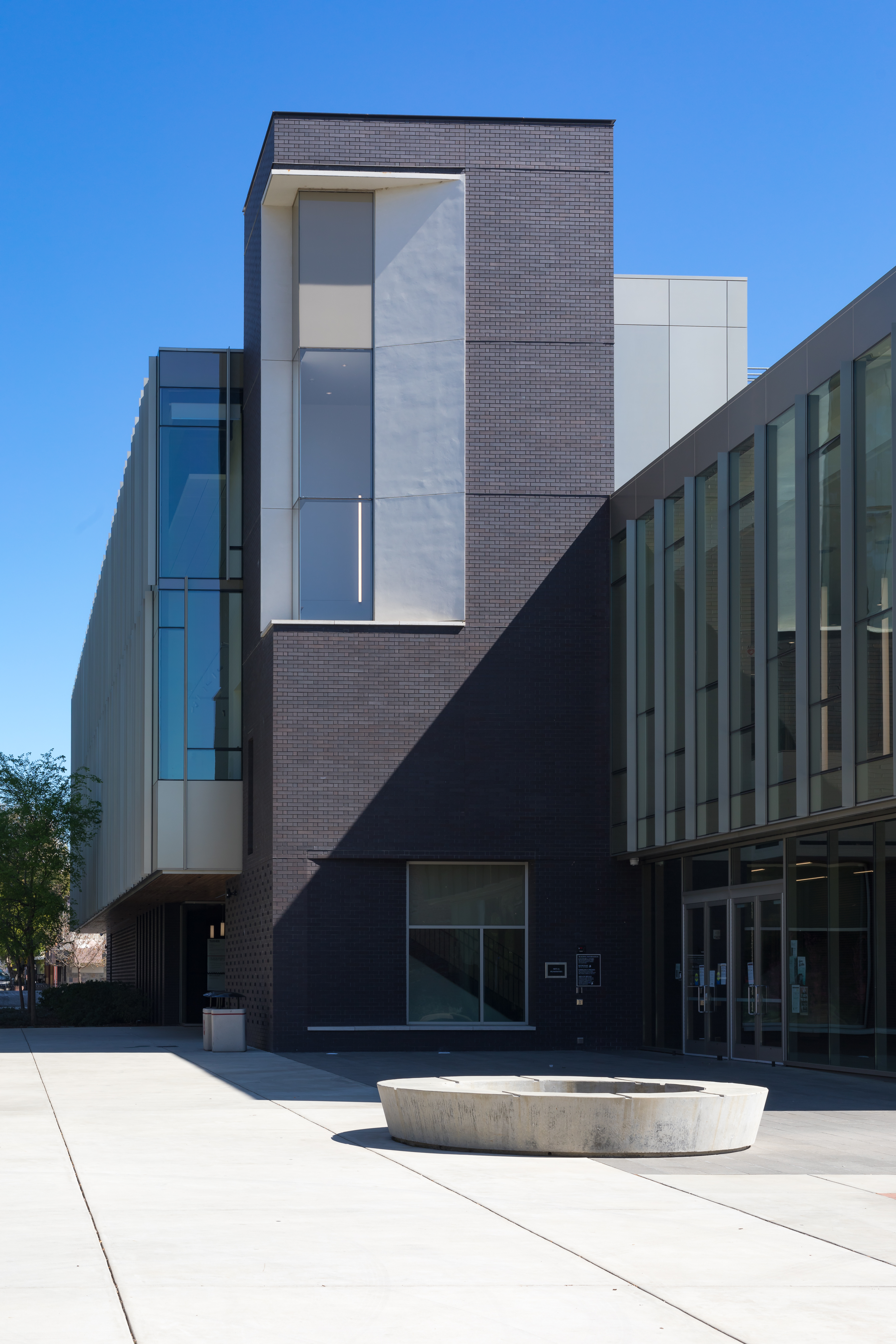
The Arts & Humanities Building is one of the newest buildings on campus. It opened in July 2016.

In 1972, Chico State College became California State University, Chico.

In 1975, broadcasts of classes through closed-circuit television were used for the first time by residents in Oroville, Marysville and Colusa. Also in 1975, The Orion, the campus student newspaper, published its first issue. In 1977, the other campus paper, The Wildcat, changed its name to Chico News and Review and moved off campus to become an independent publication. In 1978 bike riding was restricted on campus.

In 1987, Chico State was ranked as the top party school in the nation by Playboy.

CSU Chico opened its first sub-campus in Redding, affiliated with Shasta College, in 2007.

In 2005, student Matt Carrington was hazed to death at the Chi Tau (local) house, which had previously been expelled from the university in 2001 due to violations. Carrington died as a result of water intoxication during a hazing session involving the victim being forced to exercise and drink large quantities of water.

In 2010, the President of the Associated Student body, Joseph Igbineweka, was stabbed in a racially motivated attack.

In 2011, CSU, Chico received a Civic Learning Initiative Grant from the W. M. Keck Foundation to extend its efforts to establish civic engagement as a key component of students' academic success.

== Academics ==
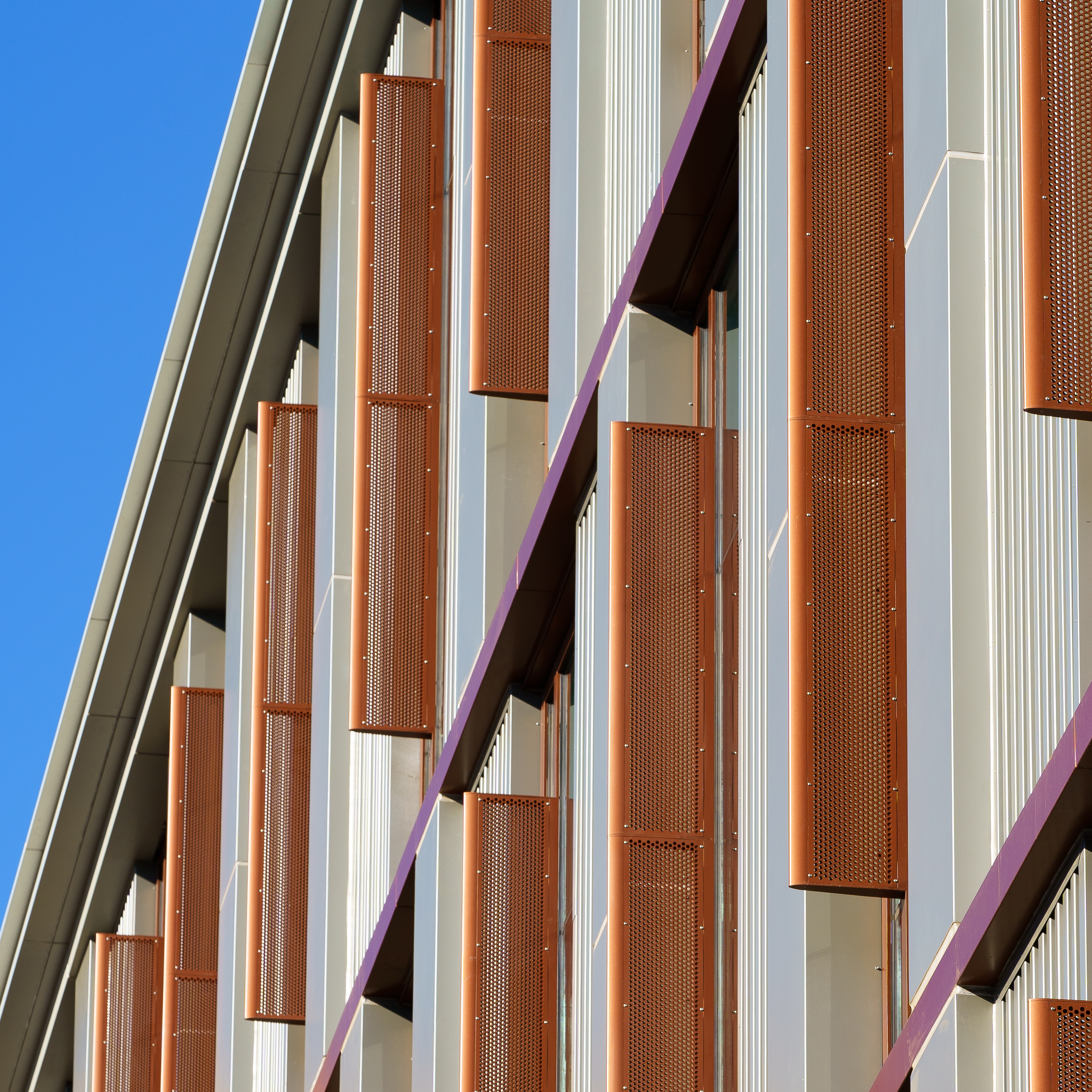
Facade of the new 110,200-square-foot Science Building

The university has more than 75 departments and offers more than 150 undergraduate degrees. It is organized into seven colleges and four schools:

- College of Agriculture
- College of Behavioral & Social Sciences
  - School of Social Work
- College of Business
- College of Communication & Education
  - School of Education
- College of Engineering, Computer Science, & Construction Management
- College of Humanities & Fine Arts
  - School of the Arts
- College of Natural Sciences
  - School of Nursing

The university's library, the Meriam Library, has several special collections of Native American and Californian history.

=== Rankings ===
Academic rankings

Master's
- Washington Monthly: 6

Regional
- U.S. News & World Report: 20

National
- Forbes: 204
- WSJ/College Pulse: 343

2025 USNWR Graduate School Rankings
Program	Ranking
Fine Arts	110
Social Work	172
Speech–Language Pathology	175
Public Affairs	200

According to the U.S. News & World Report 2025 college rankings, Chico State was ranked at 14th for "Best Colleges for Veterans", 11th in Top Public Schools, 23rd in Top Performers on Social Mobility, 62nd in Best Undergraduate Engineering Programs, and 218th in Nursing.

== Campus ==
The California State University, Chico campus consists of a 119-acre main campus, the 800-acre Paul L. Byrne Memorial University Farm, and 2,330-acres of ecological reserves. These reserves include the Big Chico Creek Ecological Reserve (BCCER) and the Butte Creek Ecological Preserve (BCEP).

=== Early construction ===
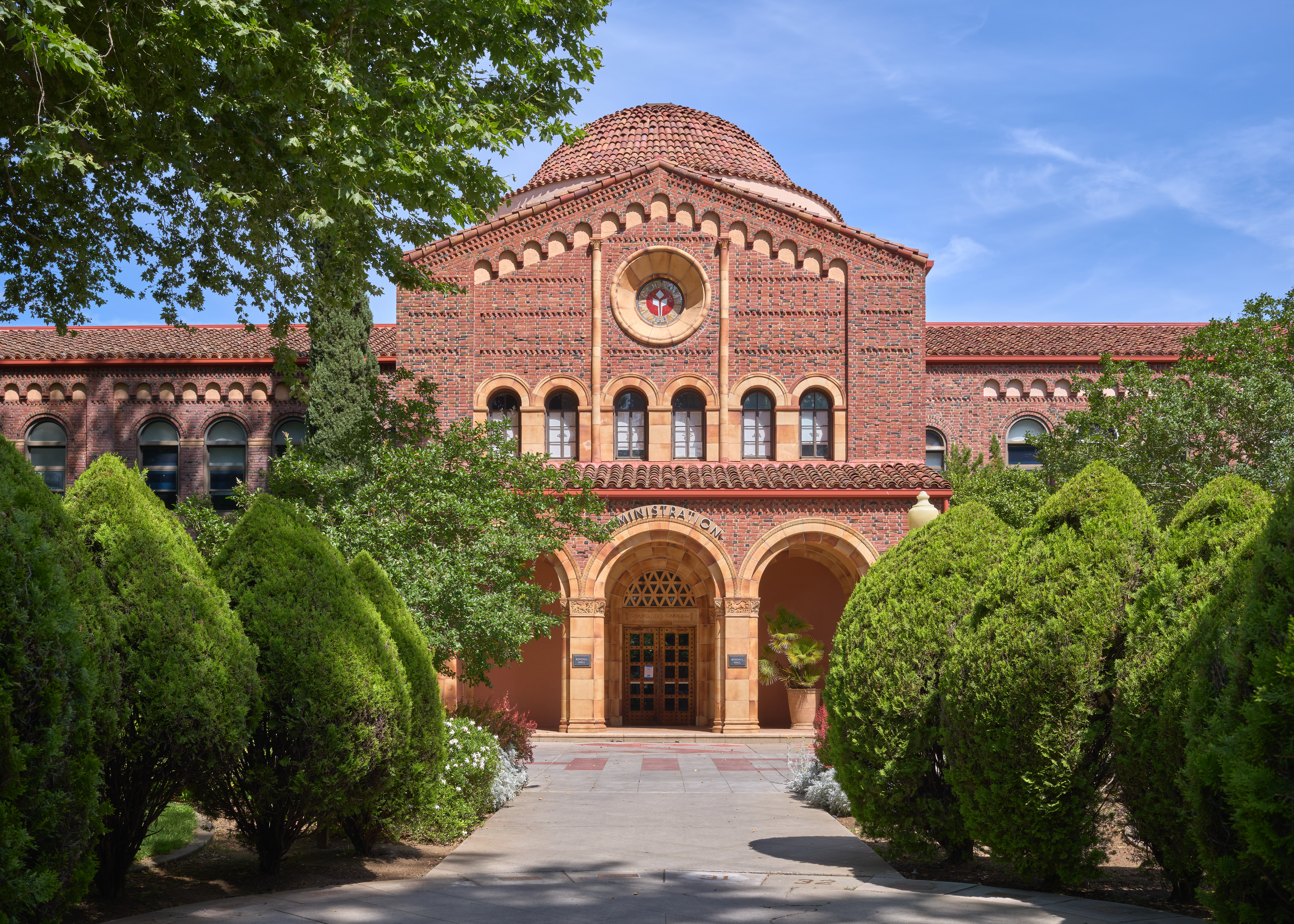
Kendall Hall in June 2023

The construction of the normal school building was begun in September 1887. It was a large brick building, consisting of three stories and full basement. It was of Romanesque design with Elizabethan gables and artificial stone trimmings. The building was destroyed by a fire in 1927. The current administration building Kendall Hall was built on the site of the normal school in 1929.

Colusa Hall, completed in 1921 is the oldest building on campus. Today it is used as a conference and public events facility.

Alfred E. Warren House, built by noted Californian architect Julia Morgan in 1922–23, serves as the university president's residence.

=== Arboretum ===
The Campus Arboretum is located along Big Chico Creek.

Nearby Bidwell Park includes 29 acres (12 ha) of a former arboretum, now run somewhat wild, which contains trees such as English oaks, hawthorn, cherry plum, bay laurel, cork oak, ponderosa, aleppo, and Monterey pines, willow, mulberry, linden, maple, catalpa, pine, and eucalyptus, collected from around the world.

=== Residence halls ===
Currently, the university can accommodate 2,150 or approximately 13% of the student body in seven on-campus residential halls. Most buildings on campus are named after California counties.

=== Meriam library ===
In 1959, Chico State College Library was built. The library was expanded and renamed to the "Learning Activities Resource Center" (LARC) in 1975. It was in 1985 when the library gained another expansion and its current name, Meriam Library. A fourth floor of the library was constructed in 1985.

== Student life ==
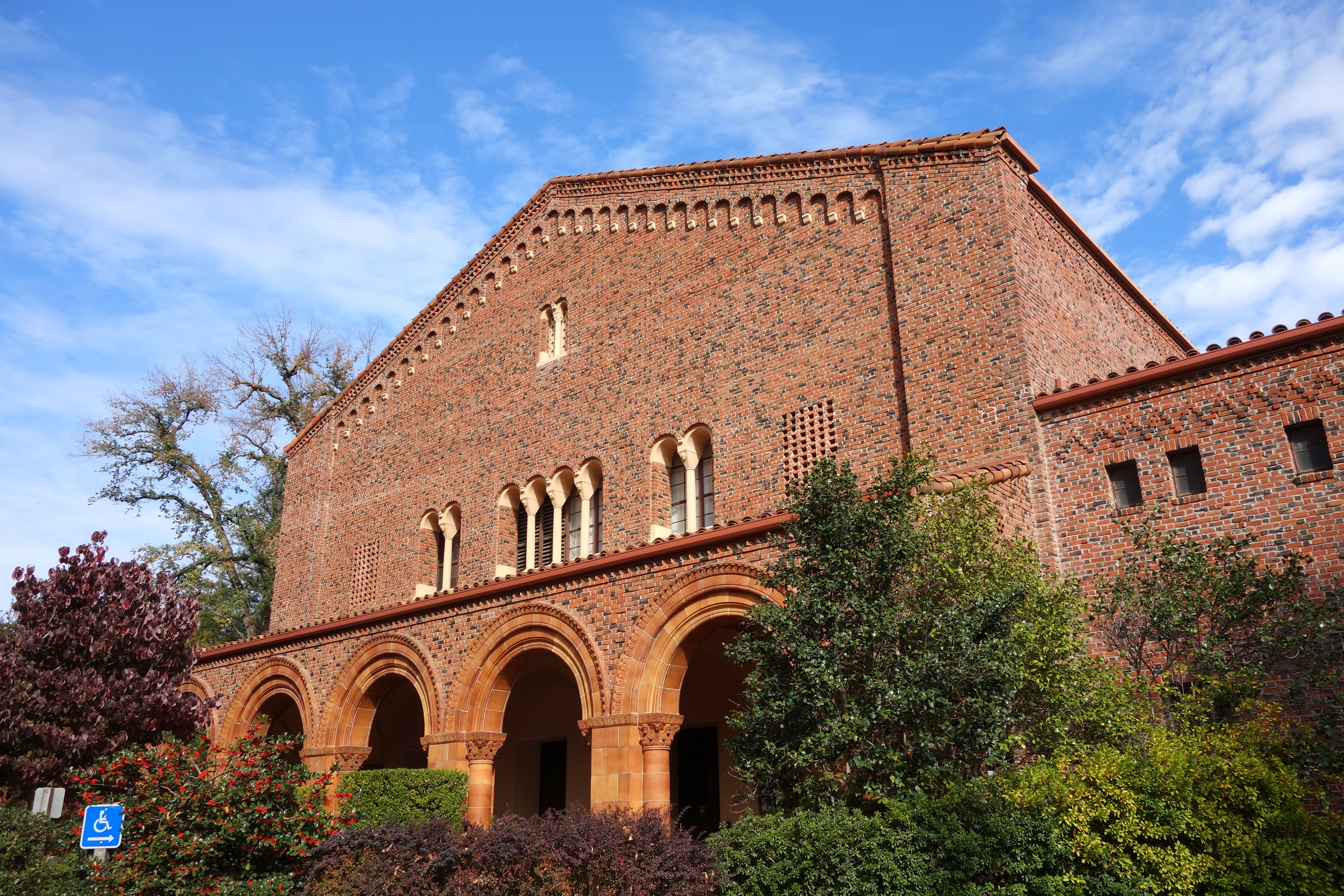
Chico State campus: Laxson Auditorium

=== Associated Students, Chico ===
Associated Students, Chico is the student government at California State University, Chico.

=== Office of Student Life and Leadership ===
Undergraduate demographics as of Fall 2023
Race and ethnicity	Total
White	67.9%
Hispanic	19.2%
Two or more races (Note: Other consists of Multiracial Americans & those who prefer to not say.)	10.1%
Asian	5%
Black	2.1%
American Indian/Alaskan Native	0.8%
Pacific Islander	0.5%
Economic diversity
Low-income (Note: The percentage of students who received an income-based federal Pell grant intended for low-income students.)	42%
Affluent (Note: The percentage of students who are a part of the American middle class at the bare minimum.)	58%

Student Life and Leadership, formally the Student Activities Office, incorporates three programs: Student Organizations and Leadership Education (SOLE), Fraternity and Sorority Affairs (FSA), and Recreational Sports.

=== Town Hall Meeting ===
Chico State has an annual event where Chico State students gather in a public area and discuss most current policy issues with their peers. Faculty members are also involved.

=== The Great Debate ===
The Great Debate was created to drive members of both the campus and the community to take part in a conversation about important issues. A different topic is chosen every semester.

=== Greek life ===
As of May 2017 Chico State has 30 fraternities and sororities, making up approximately 12 percent of the student population.

=== Demographics ===
Undergraduate admission statistics
	Fall 2025	Fall 2024	Fall 2023	Fall 2022	Fall 2021
First-time Freshmen
Applicants	22,542	23,611	22,910	22,137	19,990
Admits	20,528	21,623	20,864	20,347	17,086
Admit rate	91%	92%	91%	92%	85%
Enrolled	2,040	2,197	2,171	2,020	1,929
Yield rate	10%	10%	10%	10%	11%
Transfers
Applicants	8,281	8,341	8,393	7,083	8,377
Admits	6,290	6,563	6,377	4,192	4,428
Admit rate	76%	79%	76%	59%	53%
Enrolled	2,065	2,059	1,888	1,322	1,436
Yield rate	33%	31%	30%	32%	32%

Male to Female Percentage: 43:57%

CSU Chico along with CSU Bakersfield has the second largest enrollment percentage of Native Americans in the Cal State system.

=== Student media ===
KCSC Radio was founded in 1951. The university's student-run weekly newspaper, The Orion first began publishing in 1975. In 1989, The Orion won the National Pacemaker Award, the first of nine times the paper has won the top prize in college journalism. In 2009, The Orion won a National Pacemaker Award in the four-year non-daily newspaper category at the College Media Convention.

In 1997 Wild Oak Music Group, an independent record company, was founded and is run by the Music Industry students within the College of Humanities and Fine Arts.

== Athletics ==
The university's athletic teams are known as the Chico State Wildcats. The school sponsors soccer, basketball, golf, cross country, and track and field for both men and women. The school sponsors softball and volleyball for women, and baseball for men. The school's athletic director was Anita Barker. The school competes in Division II of the National Collegiate Athletic Association (NCAA) in the California Collegiate Athletic Association (CCAA). Since 1998, Chico State's athletic teams have won 99 NCAA Championship berths, 40 CCAA titles, 24 West Region titles, and 15 NCAA national titles. The Wildcats softball team won the first AIAW Division III national championship in 1980, led by pitcher Kathy Arendsen. Chico excels in cross country and track and field in the California Collegiate Athletic Association.

The Wildcats of Chico State earned six team NCAA championships at the Division II level. NCAA Division II individual championships by Scott Bauhs (2008) Men's cross country and J. J. Jakovac (2002, 2004) and Kyle Souza (2011) Men's Golf Championships.

- Men's Team (6)
  - Baseball (2): 1997, 1999
  - Golf (1): 1966
  - Swimming and diving (3): 1973, 1974, 1976

== Sustainability ==
The Chico State Motto, "Today decides tomorrow"

Chico State made The Princeton Review's 2011 "Guide to Green Colleges", honoring campuses that "demonstrate a strong commitment to sustainability in their academic offerings, campus infrastructure, activities, and career preparation."

== Noted people ==
=== Notable alumni ===
Name	Known for	Relationship to Chico
Annette Abbott Adams	First female Assistant Attorney General of the United States	
Nelson Briles	Former Major League Baseball player	
Donald J. Butz	United States Air Force major general	
John Canzano	Sports Writer	BA in English, 1995
Richard Campbell	Musician	
Don Carlsen	Former NFL referee retired 2012	
Doug Chapman	Actor	BA, 1994
Rocky Chávez	served in the California State Assembly	BA in English, 1973
Raymond Carver	Author	
Clay Dalrymple	Former Major League Baseball player	
Mark Davis	Owner Las Vegas Raiders	
Amanda Detmer	Actress	
Big Poppa E	Professional slam poet	Attended 1994–2000 (Journalism)
Clair Engle	United States Senator	BA, 1930
Horace Dove-Edwin	Olympian	MA in exercise science, 1999
Joddie Gleason	College basketball coach	
Ken Grossman	Co-founder Sierra Nevada Brewing Company	
Brandon Harkins	Professional golfer	
Joseph Hilbe	Statistician and philosopher	BA in Philosophy
Dominik Jakubek	Goalkeeper for Major League Soccer	BA Liberal Studies 2009
Troy Johnson	Food critic, TV judge of Food Network shows	BA Speech Communications and Poetry 1997
Mat Kearney	Columbia recording artist	Attended Chico State for 2 years
Adnan Khashoggi	Saudi businessman	
Sandra Lerner	Co-founder of Cisco Systems	BA Political Science 1975
Michael Messner	Sociologist, Professor at the University of Southern California	BA, 1974; MA, 1976
Tirin Moore	Neuroscientist and Professor at Stanford University / HHMI	BA, 1990
Bob Mulholland	Political strategist	
Troy Neiman	Baseball player	
Matt Olmstead	Writer and television producer	
Kathleen O'Neal Gear	Historian and archaeologist	BA and MA
Maureen O'Toole	Olympic silver medalist	
Michael Polenske	Entrepreneur & vintner	Bachelors in Finance
Lubna al Qasimi	Minister for Economy and Planning of the United Arab Emirates	BS in Computer Science
Ed Rollins	Political strategist	BA, 1968
Thom Ross	Artist	degree in fine arts, 1974
Gene Scott	Ordained minister and religious broadcaster	BA and MA
Carolyn Shoemaker	Astronomer	
Joshua Singleton	Television installer & video game designer (animated series Close Enough character)	
Glynnis Talken	Author	BA
Dale Thayer	Major League Baseball player	
Mark Thoma	Economist	BA, 1980
Mike Thompson	Member of the United States Congress	
Mark Ulriksen	Painter	
Johannes van Overbeek	Race car driver	
Patrick Vaughan	Historian	
Tamilee Webb	Actress and fitness pioneer	BA, MA 1996
Bill Wattenburg	Radio host, author, inventor	
Chris Wondolowski	Forward for Major League Soccer	
Don Young	Former member of the United States Congress	BA, 1958

=== Faculty ===
Name	Known for	Relationship to Chico
John Gardner	Author	Professor of English
Michael Gillis	Historian	Lecturer in history
Carolivia Herron	Author and scholar	Professor of English
Lloyd Ingles	Zoologist	Professor of zoology
Troy Jollimore	Poet	Professor of Philosophy
Janja Lalich	Sociologist	Professor of Sociology
Carolyn Ringer Lepre	Academic administrator	Professor of Journalism
Harold Lang	Dancer and actor	Professor of Dance, 1970–1985
Peveril Meigs	Geographer	Professor of Geography, 1929–1942
Nicholas Nagy-Talavera	Historian	Professor of History, 1967–1991
Michael Perelman	Author	Professor of Economics
Sarah M. Pike	Author	Professor of Comparative Religion and Humanities
Gerald Scherba	Biologist	Professor of Biology
Valene L. Smith	Tourism studies	Professor of Anthropology, 1967–1998
Jane Wells Shurmer	Women's sports	Professor of Physical Education
Ivan Sviták	Philosopher, Critic, Poet	Professor of Philosophy, 1970–1990

== University presidents ==
The following persons led California State University, Chico:

No.	Image	Name	Term start	Term end	Refs.
Principals of Chico Normal School
1		Edward Timothy Pierce	1889	1893	
2		Robert F. Pennell	1893	1897	
Presidents of Chico State College
3		Carleton M. Ritter	1897	1899	
4		Charles C. Van Liew	1899	1910	
Acting		Elmer Isaiah Miller	1910	1910	
5		Allison Ware (Note: Ware took a leave of absence for military training and service in the U.S. Army from August 1917 until his resignation from the college was accepted in May 1918.)	1910	1917	
Acting		Elmer Isaiah Miller	1917	1918	
6		Charles Osenbaugh	1918	December 5, 1930 (Note: Died in office.)	
Acting		Clarence Knight Studley	December 6, 1930	January 31, 1931	
7		Rudolph D. Lindquist	February 1, 1931	July 31, 1931 (Note: Lindquist left Chico in August 1931 for a position at Ohio State University.)	
8		Aymer Jay Hamilton	1931	July 31, 1950	
9		George Glenn Kendall	1950	1966	
10		Robert Eugene Hill	1966	August 31, 1970	
Acting		Lew Dwight Oliver	September 1, 1970	June 1971	
Presidents of California State University, Chico
11		Stanford Cazier	1971	1979	
Acting		Robert L. Fredenburg	August 1, 1979	June 30, 1980	
12		Robin Wilson	July 1, 1980	July 31, 1993	
13		Manuel A. Esteban	August 1, 1993	June 30, 2003 (Note: Esteban took almost a year's leave before official retiring on August 1, 2004.)	
Acting		Scott McNall	July 1, 2003	January 31, 2004	
14		Paul Zingg	February 1, 2004	June 30, 2016	
12		Gayle E. Hutchinson	July 1, 2016	June 30, 2023	
13		Stephen Perez	July 1, 2023	present	

Table notes:
