= Water intoxication =

Potentially fatal overhydration

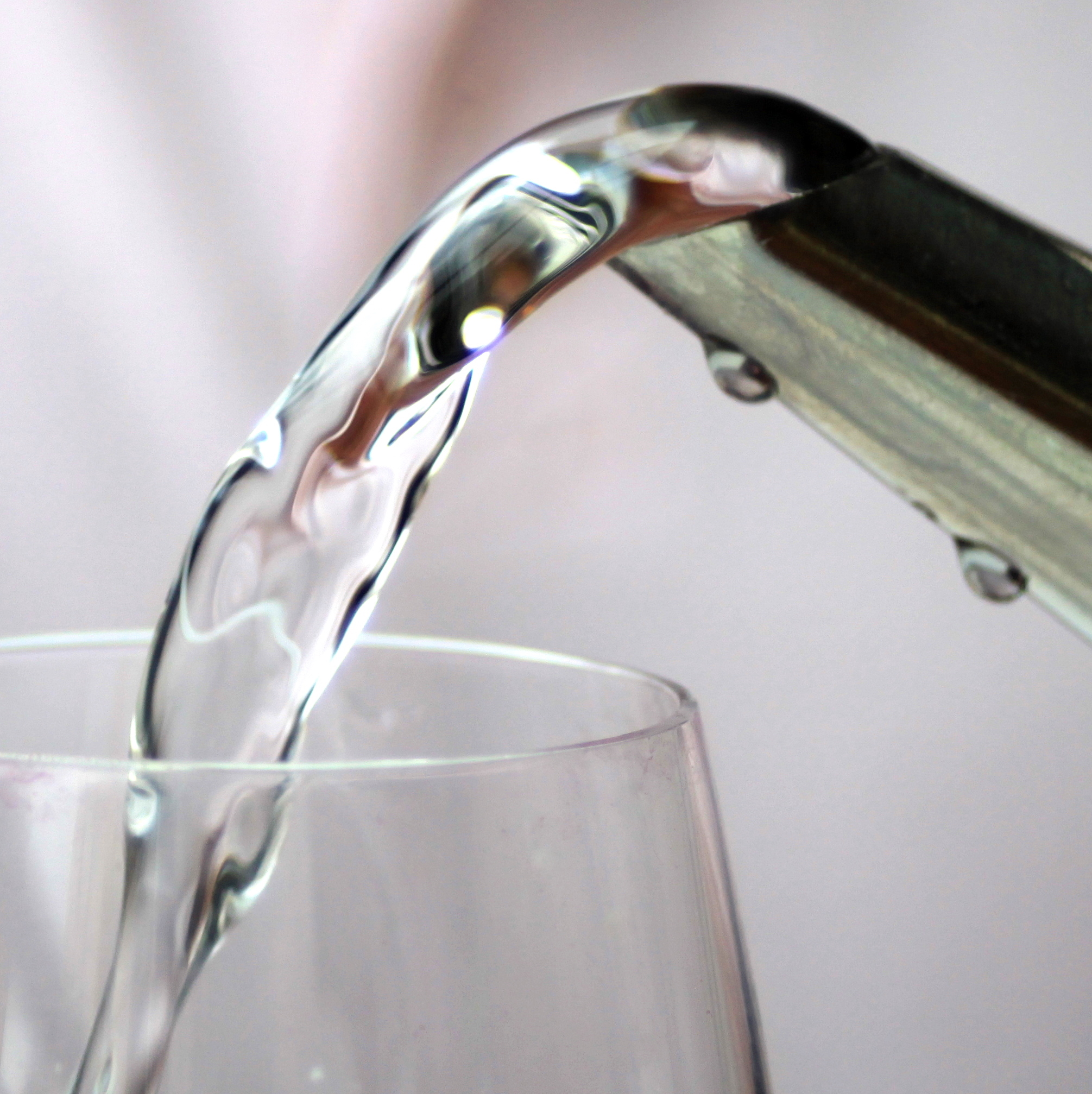
- Specialty: Toxicology, critical care medicine

Water intoxication, also known as water poisoning, hyperhydration, overhydration, or water toxemia, is a potentially fatal disturbance in brain functions that can result when the normal balance of electrolytes in the body is pushed outside safe limits by excessive water intake.

In normal circumstances, accidentally consuming too much water is exceptionally rare. Most deaths related to water intoxication in healthy individuals have resulted either from water-drinking contests, in which individuals attempt to consume large amounts of water, or from long bouts of exercise during which excessive amounts of fluid were consumed. In addition, water cure, a method of torture in which the victim is forced to consume excessive amounts of water, can cause water intoxication. Excess body water can also result from medical conditions or improper treatments, such as those causing hyponatremia.

Although water is considered one of the least toxic chemical compounds, with an LD_{50} exceeding 90,000 mg/kg (90 g/kg) body weight in rats, it can be considered a poison when over-consumed in a brief period; drinking six liters in three hours has caused the death of a human.

== Risk factors ==
=== Low body mass (infants) ===
It can be very easy for children under one year old (especially those under nine months) to absorb too much water. This is due to their small body mass; it is relatively easy for infants to take in a large amount of water relative to body mass and total body sodium stores.

=== Endurance sports ===
Marathon runners are susceptible to water intoxication if they drink too much while running. This occurs when sodium levels drop below 135 mmol/L, which can happen when athletes consume large amounts of fluid. This has been noted to be the result of the encouragement of excessive fluid replacement by various guidelines. This has largely been identified in marathon runners as a dilutional hyponatremia. A study conducted on runners completing the 2002 Boston Marathon found that thirteen percent finished the race with hyponatremia. The study concluded that the strongest predictor of hyponatremia was weight gain while racing (over-hydration), and hyponatremia was just as likely to occur in runners who chose sports drinks as those who chose water.

=== Military training ===
Hyponatremia and other physical conditions associated with water intoxication are more often seen in those participating in military training. One US Army study found 17 trainees were admitted to a hospital over a year's period for water intoxication while another found that three soldiers had died, leading to a recommendation that no more than 1–1.5 L of water should be consumed per hour of heavy sweating.

=== Overexertion and heat stress ===
Any activity or situation that promotes heavy sweating can lead to water intoxication when water is consumed to replace lost fluids. People working in extreme heat and/or humidity for long periods must take care to drink and eat in ways that help to maintain electrolyte balance. People using drugs such as MDMA (often referred to colloquially as "Ecstasy") may overexert themselves, perspire heavily, feel increased thirst, and then drink large amounts of water to rehydrate, leading to electrolyte imbalance and water intoxication – this is compounded by MDMA use increasing the levels of antidiuretic hormone (ADH), decreasing the amount of water lost through urination. Even people who are resting quietly in extreme heat or humidity may run the risk of water intoxication if they drink large amounts of water over short periods for rehydration.

=== Psychiatric conditions ===
Psychogenic polydipsia is a psychiatric condition in which patients feel compelled to drink excessive quantities of water, thus putting them at risk of water intoxication. This condition can be especially dangerous if the patient also exhibits other psychiatric indications (as is often the case), as the caretakers might misinterpret the hyponatremic symptoms.

=== Iatrogenic ===
When an unconscious person is being fed intravenously (for example, total parenteral nutrition) or via a nasogastric tube, the fluids given must be carefully balanced in composition to match fluids and electrolytes lost. These fluids are typically hypertonic, and so water is often co-administered. If the electrolytes are not monitored (even in an ambulatory patient), either hypernatremia or hyponatremia may result.

Some neurological/psychiatric medications (oxcarbazepine, among others) have been found to cause hyponatremia in some patients.

== Pathophysiology ==
At the onset of this condition, fluid outside the cells has an excessively low amount of solutes, such as sodium and other electrolytes, in comparison to the fluid inside the cells, causing the fluid to move into the cells to balance its osmotic concentration. This causes the cells to swell. The swelling increases intracranial pressure in the brain, which leads to the first observable symptoms of water intoxication: headache, personality changes, changes in behavior, confusion, irritability, and drowsiness. These are sometimes followed by difficulty breathing during exertion, muscle weakness and pain, twitching, or cramping, nausea, vomiting, thirst, and a dulled ability to perceive and interpret sensory information. As the condition persists, papillary and vital signs may result including bradycardia and widened pulse pressure. The cells in the brain may swell to the point where blood flow is interrupted resulting in cerebral edema. Swollen brain cells may also apply pressure to the brain stem causing central nervous system dysfunction. Both cerebral edema and interference with the central nervous system are dangerous and could result in seizures, brain damage, coma, or death.

== Prevention ==
Water intoxication can be prevented if a person's intake of water does not grossly exceed their losses. Healthy kidneys can excrete approximately 800 millilitres to one litre of fluid water (0.84–1.04 quarts) per hour. However, stress (from prolonged physical exertion), as well as disease states, can greatly reduce this amount.

== Treatment ==
Mild intoxication may remain asymptomatic and require only fluid restriction. In more severe cases, treatment consists of:

- Diuretics to increase urination, which are most effective for excess blood volume.
- Vasopressin receptor antagonists

== Notable cases ==
- 325 BC: Alexander the Great loses many companion travelers to excessive water intake during a march through the Gedrosian Desert.
- 1097: During the First Crusade, according to at least one chronicle, many Crusaders died after drinking too much from a river while marching to Antioch.
- 1991, Andy Warhol: Four years after his death, Warhol's family publicly accused the hospital where he had his gallbladder removed of causing his death by water intoxication administered post-operatively. A claimed autopsy weight of 68 kg (150 lb), with his weight being 58 kg (128 lb) when admitted, was cited as evidence that too much fluid had been given.
- 1995: Leah Betts, a British schoolgirl, died after drinking roughly 7 litres of water in less than 90 minutes. Though the media widely attributed her death solely to the ecstasy tablet she had taken at her 18th birthday party, an inquest determined her death was caused by water intoxication and hyponatremia.
- 2003: British actor Anthony Andrews survived a case of water intoxication. He was performing as Henry Higgins in a revival of the musical My Fair Lady at the time and consumed up to eight litres of water a day. He was unconscious and in intensive care for three days.
- 2005: American college student Matthew Carrington died from water intoxication during a Chi Tau hazing ritual at California State University. In response to Carrington's death, California passed Matt's Law, increasing penalties for hazing in the state, including felony charges.
- 2007: Jennifer Strange died after drinking nearly 2 US gallons (7.6 litres) of water in an attempt to win a Wii game console. The KDND radio station's morning show, the Morning Rave, held an on-air contest entitled "Hold Your Wee for a Wii," in which contestants were asked to drink as much water as they could without urinating. The DJs were made aware of the dangers but did not inform the contestants. KDND's parent company, Entercom Sacramento LLC, was subsequently ordered to pay $16,577,118 in damages to Strange's family.

== See also ==
- Dehydration
- Dihydrogen monoxide hoax
- Drowning
- Electrolyte imbalance
- Gastroenteritis
- Hyperkalemia / Hypokalemia
- Hypermagnesemia / Hypomagnesemia
- Hypernatremia / Hyponatremia
- Oral rehydration therapy
- List of unusual deaths
- Polydipsia
- Potomania
- The dose makes the poison
- Water urticaria
