= Matt's Law =

California, US law on hazing rituals

California State Legislature
- Long title: An act to amend Section 48900 of, and to repeal Sections 32050 and 32051 of the Education Code, and to add Section 245.6 to the Penal Code, relating to hazing.
- Enacted by: California State Legislature
- Enacted: May 30, 2006 (Senate); August 24, 2006 (Assembly, amended); August 30, 2006 (Senate, concurrence)
- Signed: September 29, 2006
- Introduced by: Tom Torlakson (D-7th-Antioch)

Matt's Law is a California law that allows for felony prosecutions when serious injuries or deaths result from hazing rituals. The bill amended the California Education Code and California Penal Code to change charges for some hazing rituals from misdemeanors to felonies, and for the first time gave prosecutors the ability to seek hazing charges against nonstudents.

The long title of the act was An act to amend Section 48900 of, and to repeal Sections 32050 and 32051 of the Education Code, and to add Section 245.6 to the Penal Code, relating to hazing.

It was introduced into the California State Senate by Tom Torlakson, a Democrat from Antioch, as Senate Bill 1454. SB 1454 passed the state Senate 34–2 on May 30, 2006. It passed the California State Assembly with amendments on August 24, 2006, and the Senate concurred with the bill as amended on August 30, 2006. It was signed into law by Governor Arnold Schwarzenegger on September 29, 2006.

Matt's Law was named in memory of Matt Carrington, a 21-year-old California State University, Chico student from Pleasant Hill, California. Carrington died in the basement of a fraternity house located two blocks from campus.

Prior to the enactment of Matt's Law, hazing (even in the case of death) was a misdemeanor as part of California's education code, rather than punishable under the state's penal code. Matt's Law prevents unaffiliated fraternities from using the argument that they cannot be punished for hazing, simply because they are not student organizations. The law also gives prosecutors clear authority to bring charges against anyone or any organization involved in hazing, not just currently enrolled students.

== Carrington's case ==
On February 2, 2005, Carrington died as a direct result of a hazing ritual performed at Chico State University in Chico, California. In the basement of the fraternity house of local fraternity Chi Tau, Carrington was forced to drink water and perform calisthenics with fans blowing on him. This water intoxication ritual, which reportedly dated back over 20 years at the local chapter, caused swelling of his brain, seizures, and heart failure. Court testimony reported that members of the fraternity delayed calling for emergency help for over an hour.

Four students pleaded guilty to crimes related to the incident. Media from all over the United States came to the Butte County courtroom to hear the sentencing, including reporters and camera crews from Dateline NBC and Inside Edition.

James DeVilla Abrille, 22, pleaded guilty to misdemeanor hazing, Jerry Ming Lim, 25, and John Paul Fickes, 20, both pleaded guilty to being accessories to involuntary manslaughter, and Gabriel John Maestretti, 22, pleaded guilty to involuntary manslaughter. These were the first felony charges brought for hazing in the United States.

== See also ==
- List of hazing deaths in the United States
