= Theta Chi =

North American collegiate fraternity

- ΘΧ
- Founded: April 10, 1856; 170 years ago Norwich University
- Type: Social
- Affiliation: FFC
- Former affiliation: NIC
- Status: Active
- Scope: North America
- Motto: "An Assisting Hand"
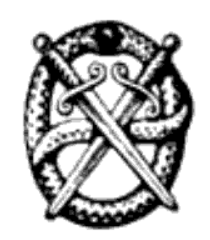
- Member badge
- Colors: Military Red and White
- Symbol: Rattlesnake
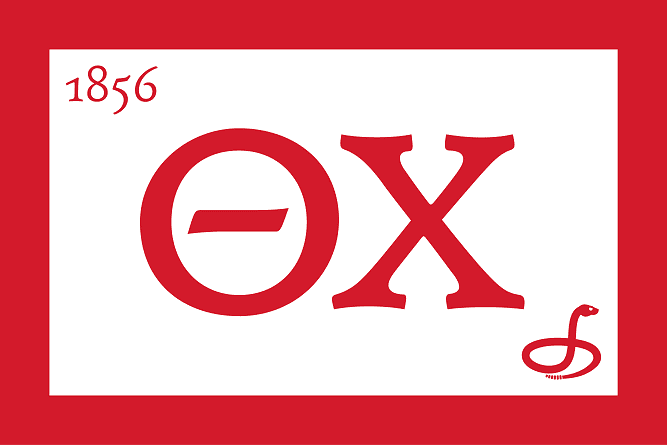
- Flag
- Flower: Red carnation
- Publication: The Rattle
- Chapters: 150 active 246 chartered
- Colonies: 8
- Members: 8,900 active 215,000 lifetime
- Headquarters: 865 W. Carmel Drive; Carmel, Indiana 46032; United States
- Website: thetachi.org

Theta Chi (ΘΧ) is an international men's college fraternity. It was founded on April 10, 1856, at Norwich University, which was then located in Norwich, Vermont. It has initiated more than 215,000 members and has over 8,900 collegiate members across North America.

== History ==
=== Founding ===
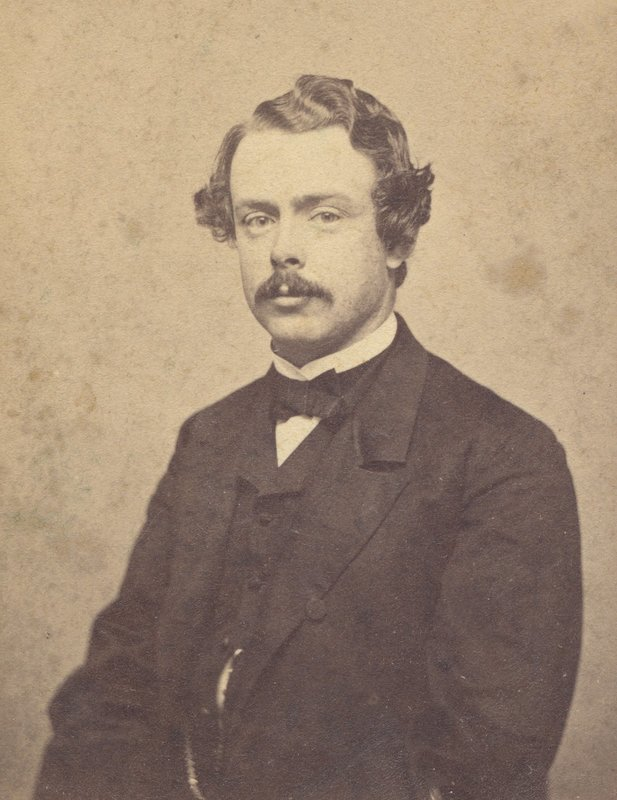
Fredrick Norton Freeman

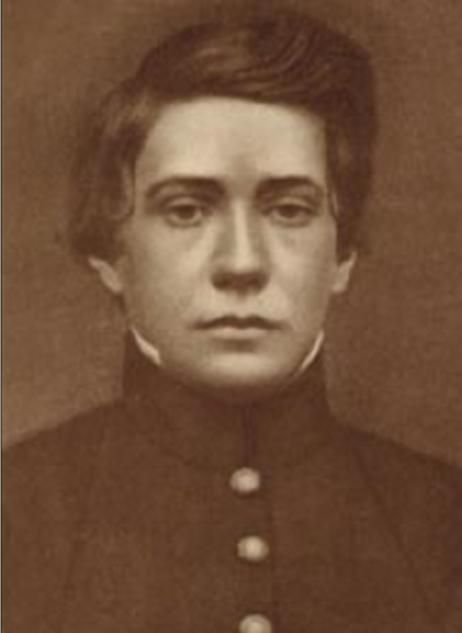
Arthur Chase

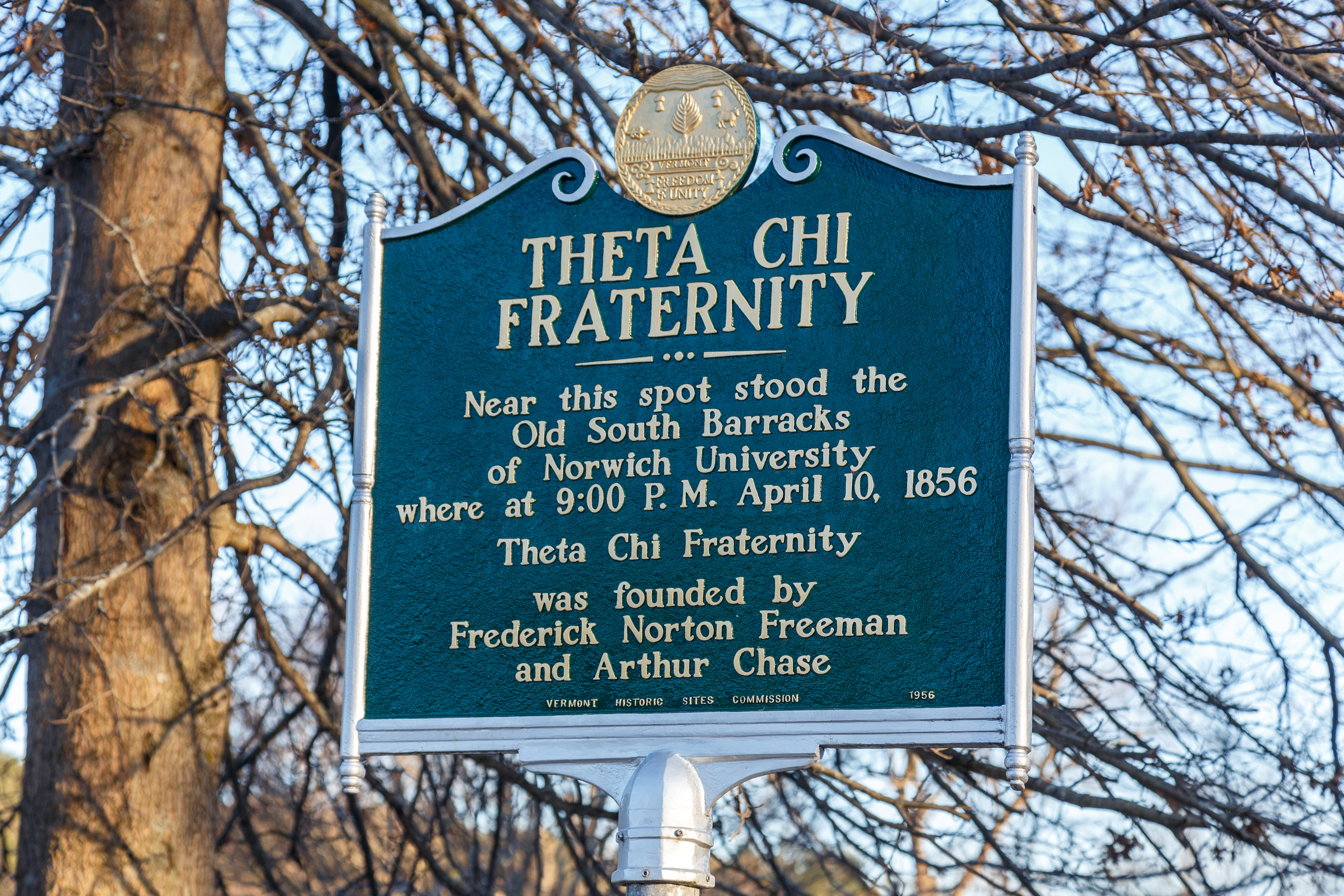
Historical sign in Norwich

Theta Chi was founded on April 10, 1856, at Norwich University in Norwich, Vermont, by two military cadets, Frederick Norton Freeman and Arthur Chase. A third man, Egbert Phelps, is considered to be the "assistant founder" for lending his help and advice to Freeman and Chase after transferring to Union College in 1854 (he was a member of Chi Psi fraternity). The first initiates after the founders were Edward Bancroft Williston and Lorenzo Potter, both initiated on April 11, 1856.

When Freeman and Chase founded Theta Chi, they spelled out its purpose in its constitution. Article I stated that the objects of Theta Chi were to "bind by closer bonds the members to each other and the mutual assistance of each of its members;" "the advancement and carrying out of any measures at the institution in which it shall be established which shall be of importance to its members," and "the mutual benefit and improvement of all its members."

Theta Chi's early history is closely connected to the history of Norwich University. In 1866, a fire devastated the university, destroying the Old South Barracks, where the fraternity had been founded. This disaster prompted the university to move from Norwich to its present location in Northfield, Vermont. In 1873, the university nearly closed due to financial reasons; however, fraternity member Charles Dole, then serving as a professor at the university, met all of the university's financial obligations from his own pocket, saving the institution. In the fall of 1881, Norwich University was reduced to only twelve students and Theta Chi's membership was reduced to one collegiate member, James M. Holland. In November of that year, Phil S. Randall and Henry B. Hersey approached Holland and insisted that they be allowed to join Theta Chi; Holland agreed, which saved the fraternity from extinction.

=== Expansion ===
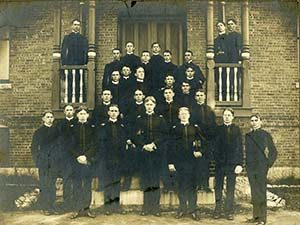
Theta Chi's chapter at Norwich University in 1902

With the help of member Charles Dole, who was serving in the Vermont State Legislature, Theta Chi was incorporated under the laws of Vermont on November 22, 1888. Alpha chapter acquired its first chapter house in 1890. There were early efforts to expand Theta Chi to Dartmouth College and Union College, but the anti-expansion sentiment among members of the Alpha chapter and unstable conditions at the university forced it to remain a single entity for 46 years.

On December 13, 1902, the Beta chapter was installed at the Massachusetts Institute of Technology after member Park Valentine Perkins transferred there from Norwich and petitioned Alpha for a charter. A Grand Chapter was organized in 1908 to direct the fraternity and promote its growth.

On April 14, 1942, Theta Chi's chapters merged with Beta Kappa with the exception of the chapter at Georgia Tech in Atlanta, which chose to become a chapter of Lambda Chi Alpha. The merger brought sixteen collegiate chapters and over 6,000 collegiate and alumnus members into the fraternity's ranks. Unlike other men's college fraternity mergers, Beta Kappa was completely absorbed into Theta Chi with no changes to the name or ritual.

The Foundation Chapter of Theta Chi Fraternity, Inc. was established in 1953 as a charity to provide educational scholarships and assistance. In 1965, the Zeta Gamma chapter was installed at the University of Alberta in Edmonton, Alberta, Canada, making Theta Chi an international fraternity.

== Symbols ==
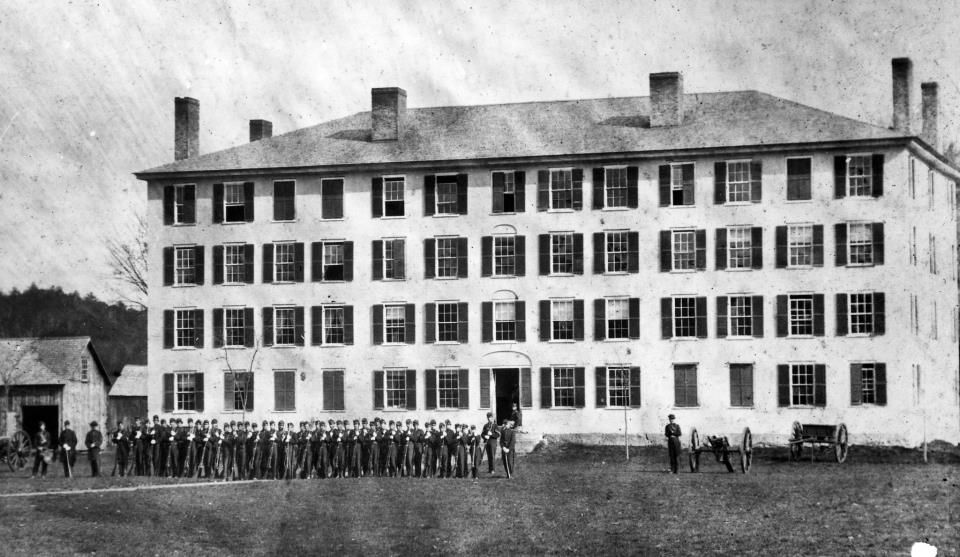
Old South Barracks

The Greek motto of Theta Chi is Θηρόποσα Χείρ, which is translated as "An Assisting Hand." Theta Chi's motto was secret from the founding in 1856 until the 1930s, at which time it was made public and incorporated into the fraternity's Coat of Arms. The fraternity's maxim is "Alma Mater First and Theta Chi for Alma Mater," and refers to one of the founding ideals of the fraternity: loyalty to one's college or university over the course of one's lifetime.

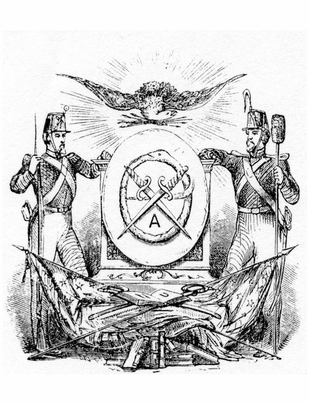
Theta Chi's original Coat of Arms

The fraternity's coat of arms official description in heraldic phraseology goes as the following: "Or, on a bend gules, a nowed serpent between two swords, points downwards, palewise all the first. On an esquire's helmet the Crest, an eagle displayed or." The true meaning of the coat of arms is known only to brothers of the fraternity. According to The Manual of Theta Chi, the original design for the coat of arms was suggested by Freeman, and members of Alpha chapter used his ideas to develop an official image. The coat of arms has undergone over a dozen modifications since, with the current design being approved in 1939.

Theta Chi's badge consists of a rattlesnake in the shape of the Greek letter "theta" and two swords which form the letter "chi." All badges are gold with the eye of the rattlesnake containing a ruby. Egbert Phelps designed the original badge. Freeman ordered the first badges from a Boston jeweler on April 12, 1856, and they were first worn on June 9, 1856.

The fraternity's colors are military red and white. Its flower is the red carnation. The national alumni publication is The Rattle. Theta Chi celebrates it Founders Day on April 10.

=== Creed ===
Frank Schrenk (Kappa, 1915) wrote the Creed of Theta Chi.

I believe in Theta Chi, its traditions and its ideals. Born of sturdy manhood, nurtured by resolute men, ennobled by high and sacred purpose, it has taken its place among the educational institutions of America as a promoter of knowledge, an advancer of culture and a builder of character.

It inspires true friendship: teaches Truth, Temperance and Tolerance, extols virtue, exacts harmony, and extends a Helping Hand to all who seek it.

I believe in the primacy of Alma Mater; in the usefulness of my Fraternity, in its influence and its accomplishments and I shall do all in my power to perpetuate its ideals, thereby serving my God, my country and my fellow-man.

=== Monument ===
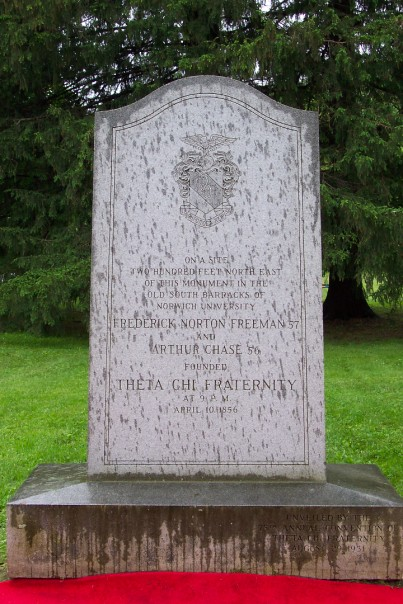
Theta Chi monument

On August 29, 1931, the day of Theta Chi's 75th Anniversary Convention, a stone monument was dedicated at Norwich, Vermont. The Monument of Theta Chi is a remembrance of the founding of Theta Chi Fraternity. The inscription appears as follows:

On a site
two hundred feet north east
of this monument in the
Old South Barracks of
Norwich University
Frederick Norton Freeman '57
and
Arthur Chase '56
founded
Theta Chi Fraternity
at 9 p. m.
April 10, 1856

== Philanthropy ==
Theta Chi's preferred philanthropies are the United Service Organizations (USO), Wounded Warrior Project, the Children's Miracle Network, the American Red Cross, Relay for Life, The Kyle Charvat Foundation, and Habitat for Humanity.

== Chapters ==
Theta Chi currently has 151 active chapters and five colonies across the United States and Canada.

== Notable members ==
Theta Chi has initiated over 215,000 members since its founding.

== Local chapter or member misconduct ==
In 1997, Binaya Oja died participating in a drinking pledging ritual at Clarkson University. Pledges were to drink until they vomited. His family filed a wrongful death lawsuit against the fraternity.

In 2008, Harrison Kowiak suffered a fatal injury while playing a capture-the-flag-like game as part of initiation at Lenoir–Rhyne University. In his family's wrongful death lawsuit filed against the fraternity, it was reported Kowiak's head struck the concrete when he was tackled.

In 2010, the Delta Xi chapter of Theta Chi at Valparaiso University had their national recognition revoked for a hazing incident which also resulted in the chapter's suspension from the university. As of 2023, the Theta Chi house in Valparaiso, Indiana still exists and its property is still owned by Theta Chi.

In 2012, Philip Dhanens died due to alcohol poisoning after drinking 37 shots of hard liquor with his fellow pledge brothers at Fresno State University. Three Theta Chi members were arrested and charged for his death following the incident, and as of 2020 the chapter is still inactive.

In 2018, a Theta Chi member and student died due to alcohol poisoning at the University of California, Santa Cruz. The organization was disbanded from the university.

In 2018, a Theta Chi pledge at Drake University sued the fraternity on the local and national levels after a hazing drinking incident left him near death.

In 2019, a Theta Chi member at the University of Arizona sued for medical expenses and severe loss of eyesight after a hazing incident on April 12, 2019. In the claim the pledge cited being beaten and forced to exercise on broken glass while members played loud Nazi music and beat the pledges. During this period a glass of habanero sauce was thrown into the pledge's eyes where he suffered chemical burns, chemosis, and a corneal abrasion.

In February 2021, a petition with over 10,000 signatures to suspend the Theta Chi chapter at the University of Massachusetts Amherst emerged after the fraternity hosted several large parties, which were allegedly the cause of higher numbers of COVID cases on the UMass campus. The chapter was put on an interim suspension, but no other punishments were given out.

In October 2021, the Theta Chi chapter at the University of Massachusetts Amherst was the center of a student protest after claims that a female student was drugged and raped at a party circulated on various social media platforms. A protest that attracted a crowd of over 300 students turned violent when car windows were broken and a resident of the Theta Chi house was hit with a bottle. Another petition that had over 30,000 signatures pushed administration to suspend the chapter, but the chancellor at the time, Kumble Subbaswamy, said without an official complaint or report, there was no way for them to properly investigate the incidents.

In December 2022, the Theta Chi chapter and school at Rutgers University–New Brunswick was sued by a freshman who was allegedly forced into drinking life-threatening amounts of alcohol as a pledge and fell down several flights of stairs, which resulted being hospitalized with severe injuries. Shortly after the lawsuit was filed, the letters on the housing for the Theta Chi chapter were taken down.

== See also ==
- List of social fraternities
