= Chi Tau (local) =

Social fraternity at Chico State University, California

- ΧΤ
- Founded: May 1, 1939; 87 years ago Chico State Teachers College
- Type: Social
- Affiliation: Independent
- Status: Defunct
- Defunct date: 2005
- Scope: Local
- Chapters: 1
- Headquarters: Chico, California; United States

Chi Tau (ΧΤ) was a local fraternity at California State University, Chico that landed in the media spotlight following the 2005 hazing death of Matthew Carrington. It was established in 1939, became a chapter of Delta Sigma Phi in 1956, separated from Delta Sigma Phi in 2001 to become a local fraternity, and went inactive in 2005.

== History ==
Chi Tau was founded as a fraternity at Chico State Teachers College (now California State University, Chico) on May 1, 1939, and operated as an unaffiliated organization. Its faculty advisor Earl C. Hald, followed by Lorenzo McHenry in 1942. Fraternity members held social events and collected scrap metal to support the war effort during World War II.

In 1954, the fraternity decided to affiliate with a national fraternity. It was chartered as the Delta Alpha chapter of Delta Sigma Phi on December 20, 1955. It was the first fraternity at Chico State to affiliate with a national fraternity.

In the 1950s, the fraternity sponsored a Christmas party for children, held social events, and sponsored an homecoming queen candidate. The fraternity was housed in the three-story Magnolia Manor on the corner of West Fourth and Chestnut Streets, a property leased for the fraternity by the Delta Sigma Phi national fraternity. The chapter's alumni governing board purchased a house for the chapter on West Fourth Street in 1991.

Delta Sigma Phi headquarters suspended the chapter in 2001 due to a series of alcohol violations; the university also expelled it. The chapter continued to operate as a rogue (unsanctioned, unrecognized) fraternity, reverting to its original name of Chi Tau. Chi Tau continued to occupy the former Delta Alpha chapter house, owned by the alumni association.

The local fraternity was known for parties, alcohol, and violence; in part because it was not held to the policies or standards of other nationally-affiliated fraternities or the campus administration. In the fall of 2003, the Interfraternity Council (IFC) at Chico State pushed for the city to remove the group's Greek letters from the front of their house because the Chi Tau organization was giving other, legitimate, Greek groups on campus a bad reputation.

== Symbols ==
The Greek letters Chi Tau were selected to represent the words "character" and "tolerance."

== Hazing death ==
In the fall of 2004, 21 year old transfer student Matthew Carrington pledged Chi Tau, along with his friend Mike Quintana. Chi Tau forced the pledges to spend the final week, known by the fraternity as "Inspiration Week," or more commonly by the pledges as "Hell Week", in the basement of the fraternity house. The 10-foot by 20-foot basement was a cold, damp room littered with cigarette butts and writing on the walls, including the phrase "In the basement, no one can hear you scream."

=== Day 1 ===
Matt's time in the chapter house's basement began on January 30, 2005. On that day, a sewer line in the house burst, flooding the basement with several inches of sewage-contaminated water. Pledges were forced to do push-ups and sit-ups in the sewage and sleep in small cubby holes that had been cut into the basement wall.

=== Day 2 ===
The "Pledge Olympics" got underway around 11 p.m. on January 31, 2005. Pledges were forced to run up and down the stairs and play wiffle ball inside the house. Due to extremely cold conditions, they were allowed to sleep in the main portion of the house instead of the basement.

=== Day 3 ===
The events of February 1, 2005 lasted into the early hours of Wednesday morning. Carrington and Quintana were instructed to stand on one foot on a wooden bench, wearing only T-shirts, jeans, and socks, while Chi Tau members quizzed them on fraternity history. If an incorrect answer was given, they were told to drink as much water as possible from a five-gallon Alhambra bottle or do push-ups on the floor. Cold water was also poured on them while being blasted by fans. They had to ask permission to urinate on themselves and were eventually told to take their shirts off with basement temperatures in the range of 30 to 39 °F (−1 to 4 °C).

Near 2 a.m., active Chi Tau members, Gabriel Maestretti, John Paul Fickes, and James DeVilla Abrille, arrived at the house after a night of heavy drinking. Maestretti passed out on a couch in the basement. Around 2:30 a.m., the pledges, already in poor condition, were told they were done. However, Maestretti woke up and decided he would take over the initiation event instead of allowing the pledges to leave the basement or sleep. Fickes and Abrille joined in on the events that would follow. They ignored other members of the fraternity who came down to the basement on two occasions and told the three to stop. At one point, Carrington dropped the five-gallon bottle and spilled water on one of the three actives. He was forced to do more push-ups as punishment.

Carrington collapsed around 3:40 a.m. and went into a seizure that lasted nearly one minute. Chi Tau members changed Carrington out of his wet clothing and laid him on the couch after wrapping him in a sleeping bag. Quintana noticed that Carrington had stopped breathing around 5 a.m. He performed CPR on Carrington until paramedics arrived and transported him to Enloe Medical Center, where he died soon after arrival on February 2, 2005. The official cause of death was cardiac dysrhythmia and cerebral edema, or brain-swelling, due to water intoxication. Hypothermia also contributed to the death.

=== Aftermath ===
In response to the death of Carrington, California passed Matt's Law, which allowed for felony prosecutions of hazing deaths. Before the passing of Matt's Law, crimes stemming from hazing were only prosecutable as misdemeanors.

Due to the passage of Matt's Law, the death of Carrington resulted in the first felony charges brought for hazing in the United States. Maestretti pleaded guilty to involuntary manslaughter, DeVilla Abrille pleaded guilty to misdemeanor hazing, and Fickes and Jerry Ming Lim both pleaded guilty to being accessories to involuntary manslaughter. All four men were given jail sentences ranging from ninety days to one year, with Maestretti receiving a sentence of one year. At his sentencing, Maestretti said, "I did what I did out of a misguided sense of building brotherhood, and instead I lost a brother. I will live with the consequences of hazing for the rest of my life. My actions killed a good person, and I will be a felon for the rest of my life, and I'll have to live with that disability, but I'm alive and Matt's not."

After Carrington's death, Chico State University temporarily placed all Greek recruitment on suspension. Chi Tau was shut down, and its building was sold.

== See also ==
- Hazing in Greek letter organizations
- List of hazing deaths in the United States
