= Military history of Asian Americans =

Aspect of United States military history

Asian Americans, who are Americans of Asian descent, have fought and served on behalf of the United States since the American Revolutionary War. During the American Civil War Asian Americans fought for both the Union and the Confederacy. Afterwards Asian Americans served primarily in the U.S. Navy until the Philippine–American War.

At the beginning of the 20th century, Asian Americans began to attend U.S. military academies, and the first Asian Americans were awarded the Medal of Honor. World War I saw Asian Americans serving as "non-whites" in the National Army. After World War I, Asian American service fell into obscurity until World War II when significant contributions by Japanese, Chinese, Filipino, and Korean Americans were documented.

With the desegregation of the U.S. military in 1948, segregated Asian American units ceased to exist, and Asian Americans served in integrated armed forces. Asian American combatants in the Korean and Vietnam conflicts were awarded the Medal of Honor, and Asian Americans have continued to serve into the present day.

== 18th century ==
=== American Revolutionary War ===
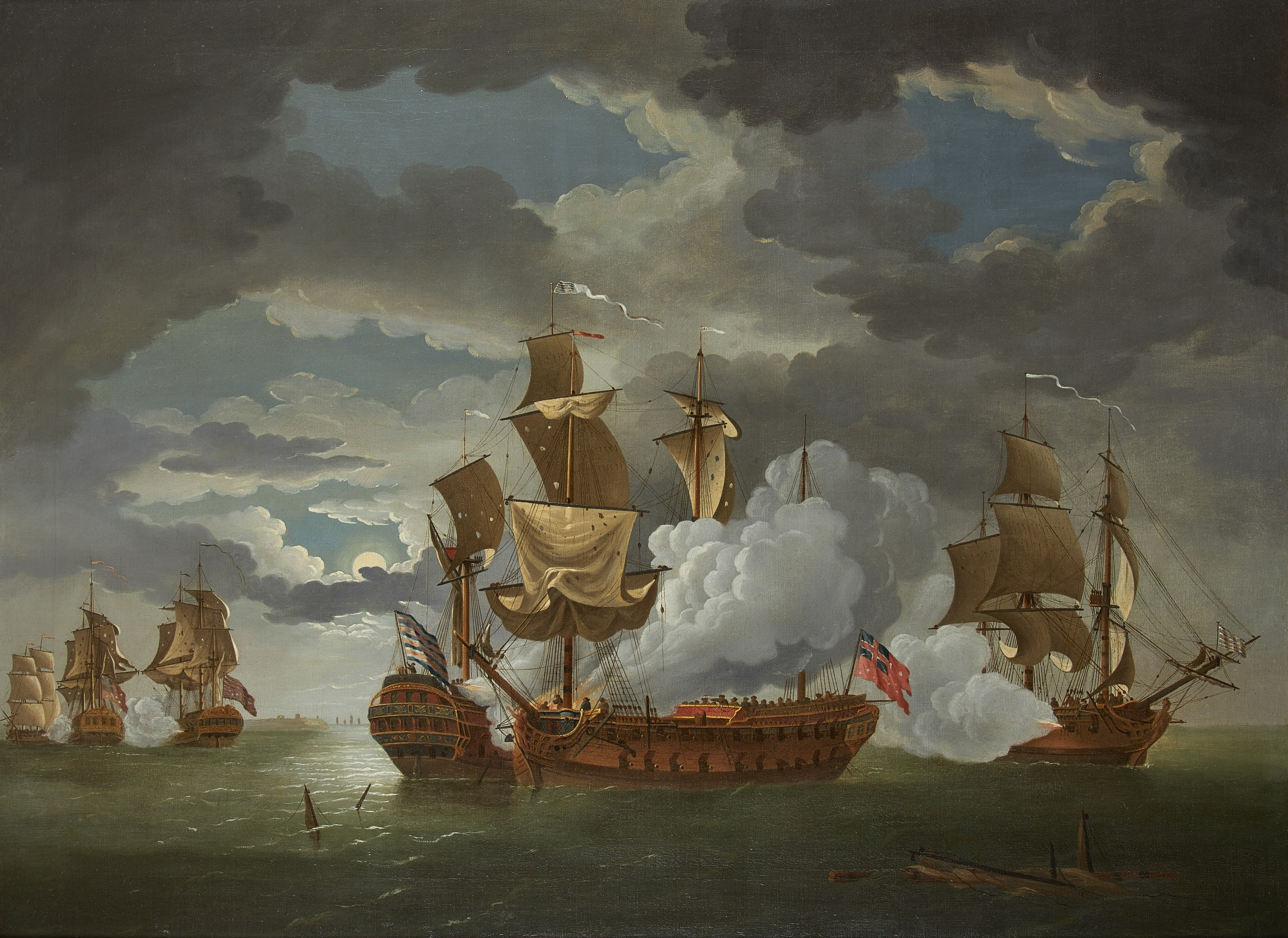
The Battle of Flamborough Head, fought in 1779 off the East Coast of England, involved Malay sailors making up one of the many ethnicities serving onboard Captain John Paul Jones' flagship the USS Bonhomme Richard

Historian Daniel Sieh states that Asian Americans during the American Revolutionary War, while few, were fairly widespread throughout the colonies, numbering at least a hundred during the 1770s and 1780s. Asian Americans during the Revolution largely served as "sailors, servants, and enslaved people." In the diaries of American naval captain John Paul Jones, Malays were listed as one of the ethnicities who were part of the crew of the USS Bonhomme Richard during the Battle of Flamborough Head in 1779.

Another four Asian Americans, who are well-documented, are also known to have fought in the American Revolution (two serving with the American Continentals and two with the British).

== 19th century ==
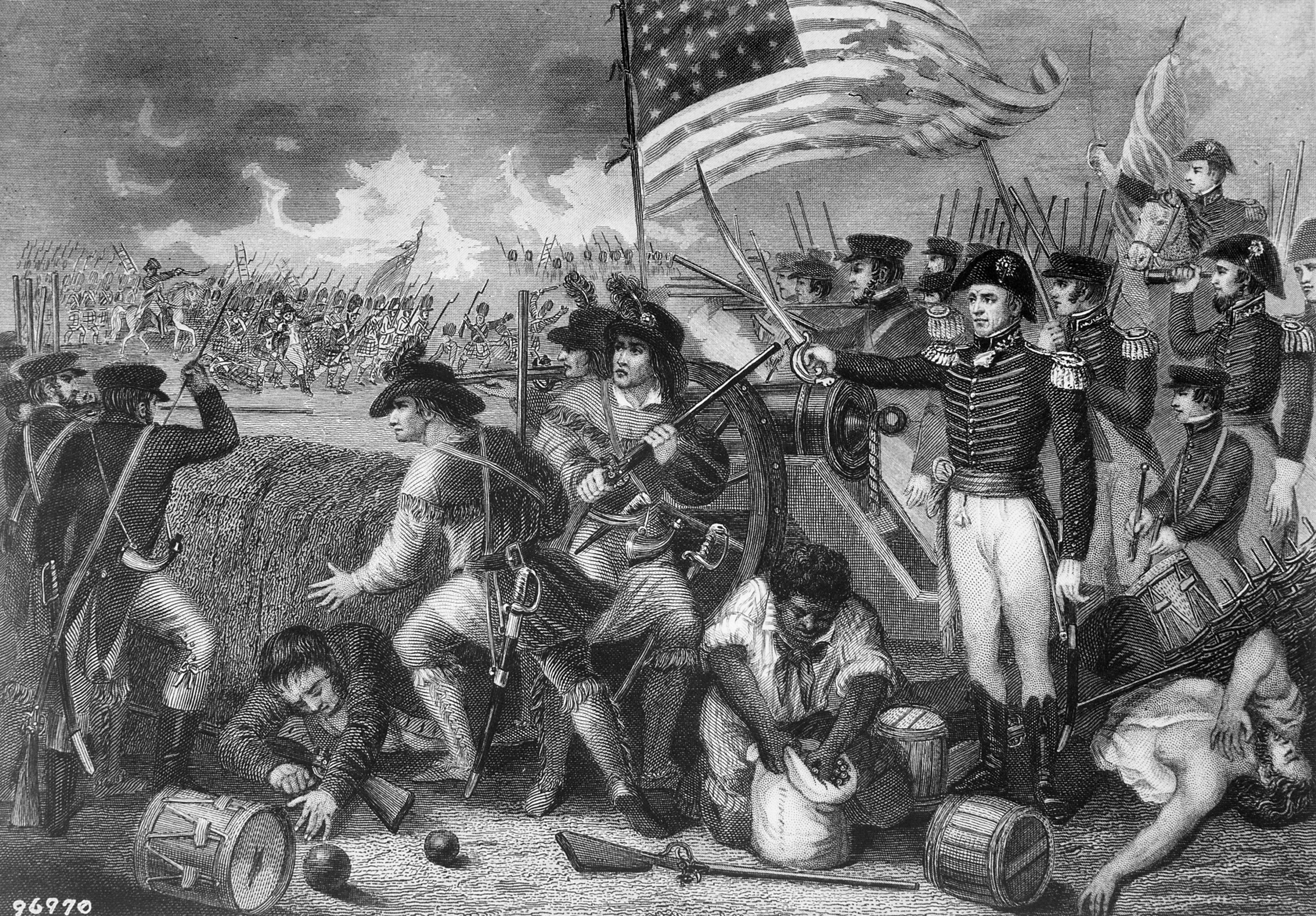
An engraving of Andrew Jackson commanding the American artillery batteries at the Battle of New Orleans in 1815. Filipino Americans were the earliest recorded Asian-Americans to serve in the United States Army.

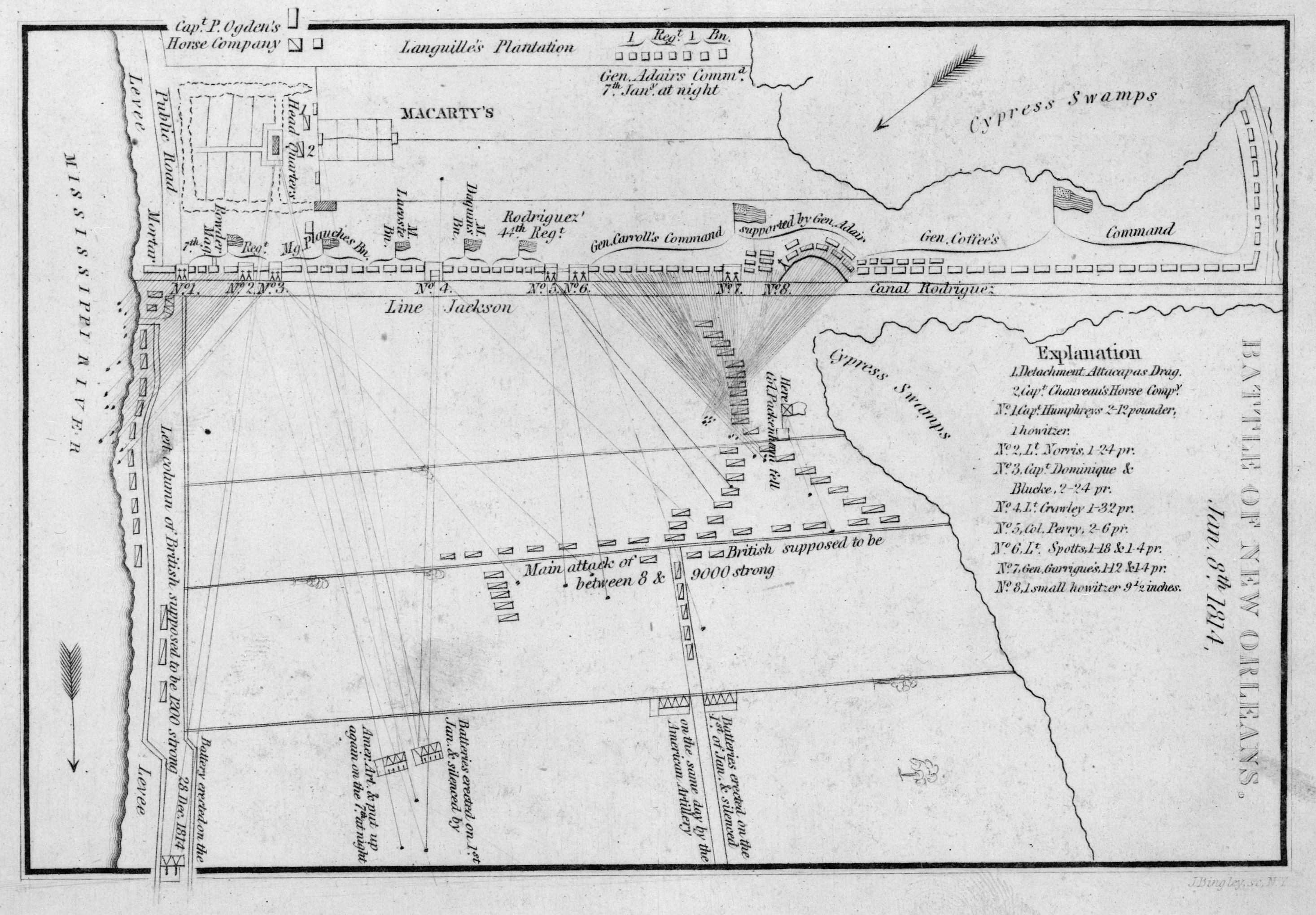
Map of the Battle of New Orleans, where Filipino Americans, known as "Manilamen", played a decisive role in 1815 during the War of 1812 in manning the artillery defenses, which allowed American forces to repulse enemy forces during the battle.

=== War of 1812 ===
During the War of 1812, General Andrew Jackson recorded that "Manilamen" had fought under his general command in defense of New Orleans, under the direct command of Jean Baptiste Lafitte. Following the war, at least one Filipino American, Augustin Feliciano, continued to serve in the U.S. Navy. From the end of the War of 1812 to the beginning of the American Civil War, Asian Americans were not recorded in the annals of U.S. military history.

=== American Civil War ===
Many more Asian Americans served in the forces of both sides of the Civil War, being born in various places including Amoy, Batavia, Bombay, (Note: The city of Bombay was, and under its modern name of Mumbai. During the British Raj, it was the seat of government of the Bombay Presidency. It is possible that "Bombay" in the source refers not only to the city itself, but also to that much larger region which made up the presidency.) Borneo, Burma, Calcutta, Canton, (Note: Canton has multiple meanings. The source is unspecific, but only two of the meanings relate to Asia (more precisely, to China). Those are the old romanized names of the city of Canton (modern Guangzhou), which was the capital of the province of Canton (modern Guangdong). It is unclear whether the narrower or the broader meaning was intended.) Changchow, (Note: There are two cities, both in China, whose names were at one time romanized as Changchow: Changzhou in Jiangsu Province and Zhangzhou in Fujian Province. Both are sizable port cities. The source does not say which one, or both, was meant.) Ceylon, China, East Indies, Goa, Kingdom of Hawaii, Hong Kong, India, Japan, Java, Lahore, Manila, Malaya, Mauritius, Moulmein, the Philippines, Siam, Singapore, and Sumatra.

Indian-American Charles J. Simons, an Anglo-Indian, was awarded the Medal of Honor, for his actions during the American Civil War in the Battle of the Crater in 1864.

Below is listed in alphabetical order.

==== Burmese Americans ====
William C. Lutter, born in Moulmein, Burma circa 1840, enlisted in New York for one year as a United States Navy sailor in September 1862. He served onboard the USS Mohican.

==== Chinese Americans ====
Chinese immigrants served the Union cause by enlisting in both in the Union Army and Navy, while some immigrants served with the Confederacy in Louisiana. Pictured is Corporal Joseph Pierce, a Chinese Union soldier born in Canton, who served in the 14th Connecticut Infantry Regiment, Company F, fighting in the Battles of Antietam and Gettysburg.

In 1861, a Chinese American by the name of John Tomney joined the New York Infantry, eventually dying of wounds received at the Battle of Gettysburg in 1863.

Joseph Pierce (his chosen name) was brought to the U.S. from China by his adoptive father, Connecticut ship captain and Far East trader Amos Peck. Pierce enlisted on 26 July 1862 and was mustered into the Fourteenth Regiment, Company F of the Connecticut Volunteer Infantry that became part of the Second Brigade of the Third Division, Second Army Corps of the Army of the Potomac. From 1862 to 1865, Pierce fought in pivotal battles of the war, fighting in major campaigns from Antietam to Gettysburg to Lee's surrender at Appomattox Court House. Pierce achieved the highest rank of any Chinese American to serve in the Union Army, reaching the rank of corporal. Pierce's picture hangs in the Gettysburg Museum. In 2007, the U.S. House of Representatives passed a resolution honoring the actions of Pierce and other Asian-Pacific Islander soldiers of the Civil War.

Edward Day Cohota was born in Shanghai, China, and was "adopted" by the captain of the merchant ship Cohota, Sargent S. Day. He served in the 23rd Massachusetts Infantry during the American Civil War. After the war, he rejoined the Army and served for 30 years. Cohota believed he was a U.S. citizen by virtue of having served in the Union Army, but his service had not automatically conferred citizenship upon him, and the passing of the Chinese Exclusion Act in 1882 kept him from becoming a naturalized citizen.

William Ah Hang, a Chinese American, became one of the first Asian Americans to enlist in the U.S. Navy in 1863. In total more than 50 Chinese Americans fought, on both sides, in the Civil War. Of those who served, only a handful received recognition of their service in the form of pension, benefits, or citizenship. An exception was Ching Lee, who took the alias Thomas Sylvanus and served in the 81st Pennsylvania Regiment.

==== Filipino Americans ====
Filipinos served the Union cause while some enlisted with the Confederates in Louisiana, serving in the Confederate Army. The majority of Filipino recruits during the war served in the Union Navy. Pictured is Corporal Felix Cornelius Balderry, one of two Filipinos to serve in the Union Army was born in the Philippines, belonged to the 11th Michigan Volunteer Infantry Regiment, Companies A and F, fighting in the Battles of Resaca and Kenesaw Mountain, and the siege of Atlanta.

Filipino American, Felix Cornelius Balderry, served in the Union's Michigan 11th Infantry. Other Filipino Americans served in the U.S. Navy aboard the Little Ada, the Conemaugh, and other ships.

There are accounts of Filipino Americans serving in Louisiana with the Confederacy during the Civil War; one served aboard the C.S.S. Alabama, and some served in the Louisiana Zouaves.

More than a hundred documented Native Hawaiians also served in the Civil War, however due to poor record keeping of non-white combatants, the origin of some participants like Prince Romerson have been claimed by both the Filipino and Native Hawaiian communities as many are listed under anglicized names such as "John Boy" with no other information other than as being from "The Sandwich Islands" with dark eyes, hair and complexion.

==== Indian Americans ====
A number of individuals from India and the Indian subcontinent served during the American Civil War.

Anthony F. Gomez, who was born in Lahore in 1837 as Conjee Rustumjee Cohoujee Bey to an aristocratic Parsi family, joined the United States Navy in 1863 after settling in Brooklyn, New York and converting to Christianity, serving during the Civil War. After the Civil War, he moved to San Francisco in 1867, married a local woman, and worked for the Navy until his death in 1911 from pneumonia.

Charles J. Simons, born in Bombay, was awarded the Medal of Honor for his actions at the Battle of the Crater. He enlisted as a sergeant in 1861 and was assigned to Company A, 9th New Hampshire Infantry Regiment in 1862. He was promoted to Second Lieutenant in 1864 and First Lieutenant in early 1865. He died in 1914 in Chicago, Illinois.

==== Indonesian Americans ====
A number of individuals from Indonesia served during the American Civil War.

John Brown, a 27 year old from Java enlisted three years with Company F, 40th New York Infantry Regiment in 1861. He was discharged for disability in April 1862.

==== Thai Americans ====
The famous "Siamese Twins", Chang and Eng Bunker, owned slaves and a farm in Mount Airy, N.C. Their oldest sons — cousins Christopher Wren Bunker and Stephen Decatur Bunker, born to Chang and Eng, respectively — joined the 37th Virginia Cavalry Battalion. In 1864, Christopher Bunker was captured and imprisoned at Camp Chase, where he caught smallpox. After the war, both Christopher and Stephen settled in Mount Airy.

George Dupont migrated to the US from Siam in 1860 and served in Company B, 13th New Jersey Infantry Regiment during the Civil War. He saw action at the Battles of Antietam, Chancellorsville, Gettysburg, and Sherman's March to the Sea. He became a naturalized American citizen after the war and moved back to Thailand to become a drill master for the then newly-created Royal Siamese Army. He received a pension for an injury he received post-war. He died in 1900 in Siam and was buried in the Bangkok Protestant Cemetery in Bangkok, Thailand.

Antone Henry served in the United States Navy as an ordinary seaman from 1864 for three years. He was born in 1844 in either Roto (near Guam) or Siam. He served on the USS Ohio and the USS Colorado.

=== 19th century Asian American military academy graduates ===
In the late 1860s, Asians were accepted into the United States Naval Academy at Annapolis. Matsumura Junzo was the first to graduate in 1873. Matsumura was a foreign national, and like the other Asian graduates who attended around this time who went on to serve their own nations' militaries, upon graduation he served in the Imperial Japanese Navy, eventually reaching the rank of captain. Nearly forty years passed before the first Asian American U.S. nationals followed in the footsteps of these foreign nationals and were accepted into the various U.S. military academies.

=== Spanish–American War ===
Another lull in recordings of Asian American service followed the end of the Civil War until the Spanish–American War. When the USS Maine sank in Havana Harbor, seven of the casualties were Japanese Americans and one was a Chinese American. Later in the war it was recorded that Japanese Americans served aboard U.S. warships in the Battle of Manila Bay; the Philippine–American War, previously known as the Philippine Insurrection, followed.

== 20th century ==
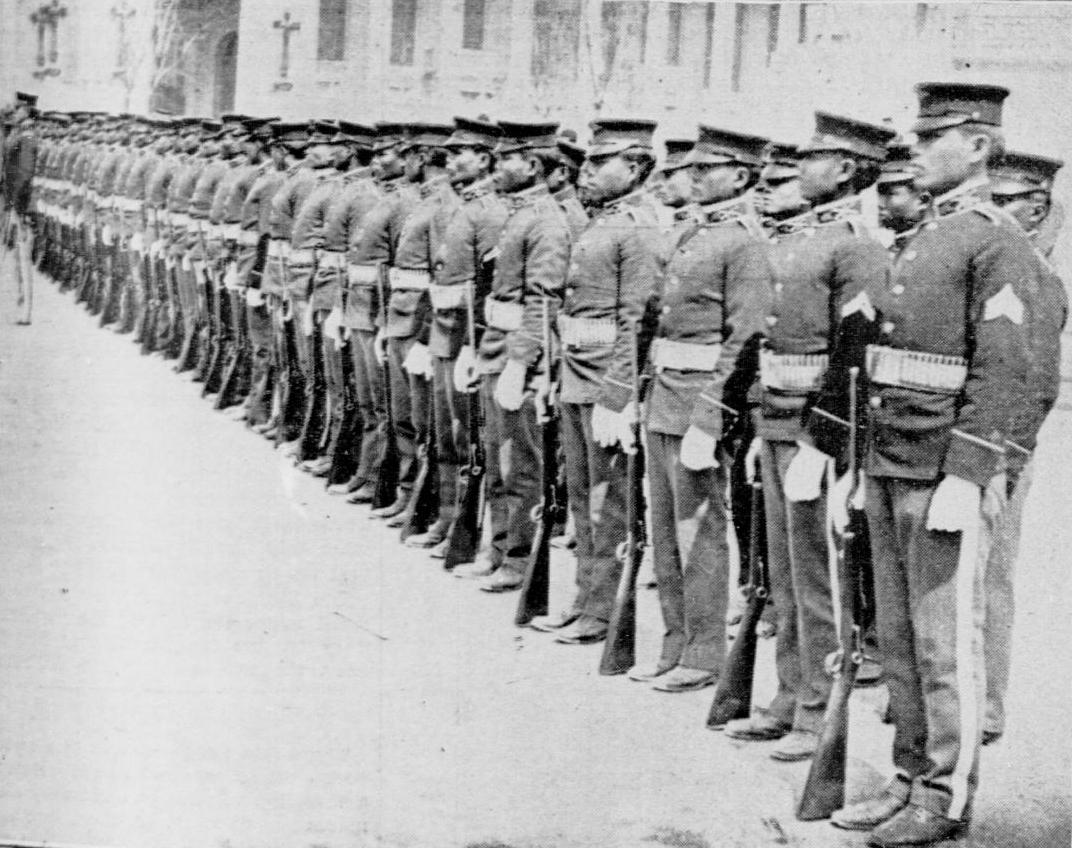
Formation of Filipinos in the U.S. Army Philippine Scouts in the Philippine Islands a territory of the U.S. in 1905

=== Philippine–American War and Moro Rebellion ===
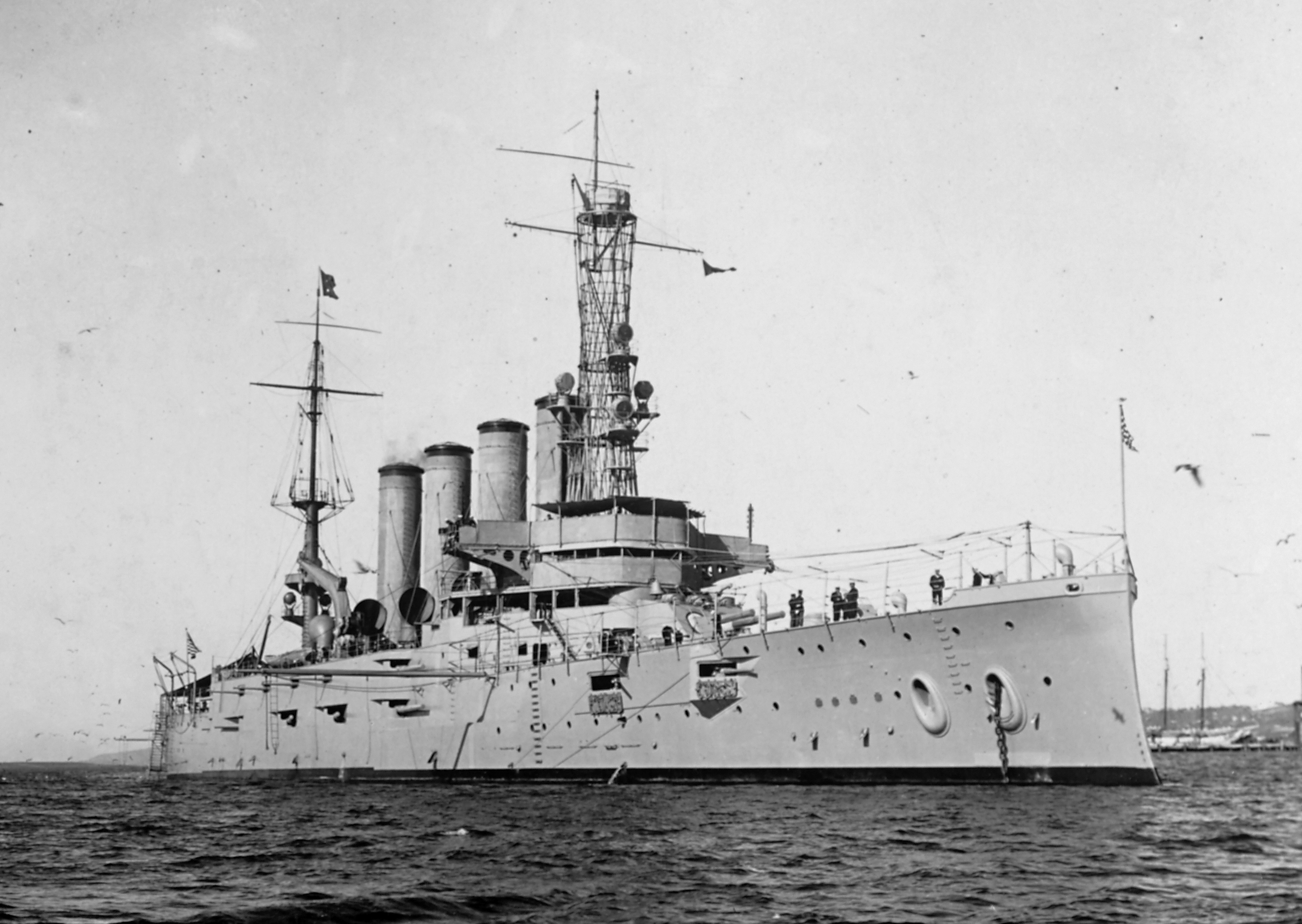
USS San Diego in 1915

In 1901, the Philippine Constabulary and Philippine Scouts were initially founded to assist the U.S. against the forces of the First Philippine Republic and the insurgency that followed after its collapse. That same year President William McKinley signed an executive order to allow 500 Filipinos to enlist in the U.S. Navy. From these routes of enlistment came the first Asian American recipients of the Medal of Honor. Private Jose Nisperos, a Philippine Scout, protected his party from Moros; for this action, he received the Medal of Honor in 1911. In 1915, Fireman Second Class Telesforo Trinidad, along with Ensign Robert Webster Cary, was awarded the Medal of Honor for saving fellow crewmembers when the boiler of the USS San Diego exploded. As of 2011, Trinidad has been the only Asian American recipient of the naval version of the Medal of Honor. During the Presidency of William Howard Taft, Filipino Stewards began to serve in the White House, a practice that would continue into the end of the 20th Century, to include during the Presidency of Bill Clinton.

=== 20th century Asian American military academy graduates ===
Vicente Lim was one of the first Asian Americans to graduate. A Filipino American and U.S. national from the Philippines, Lim graduated from West Point in the class of 1914 and was commissioned as a second lieutenant in the Philippine Scouts. He was the first of a handful of Filipinos accepted into West Point under a quota system that required one Filipino to be appointed in each class, with no more than four being enrolled at any one time.

In 1916, Filipinos Americans began to be accepted into Annapolis; the first batch would enroll in 1919. The graduates lost their status as U.S. nationals in 1935, and many went on to serve in the fledgling Armed Forces of the Philippines.

=== Mexican Expedition ===
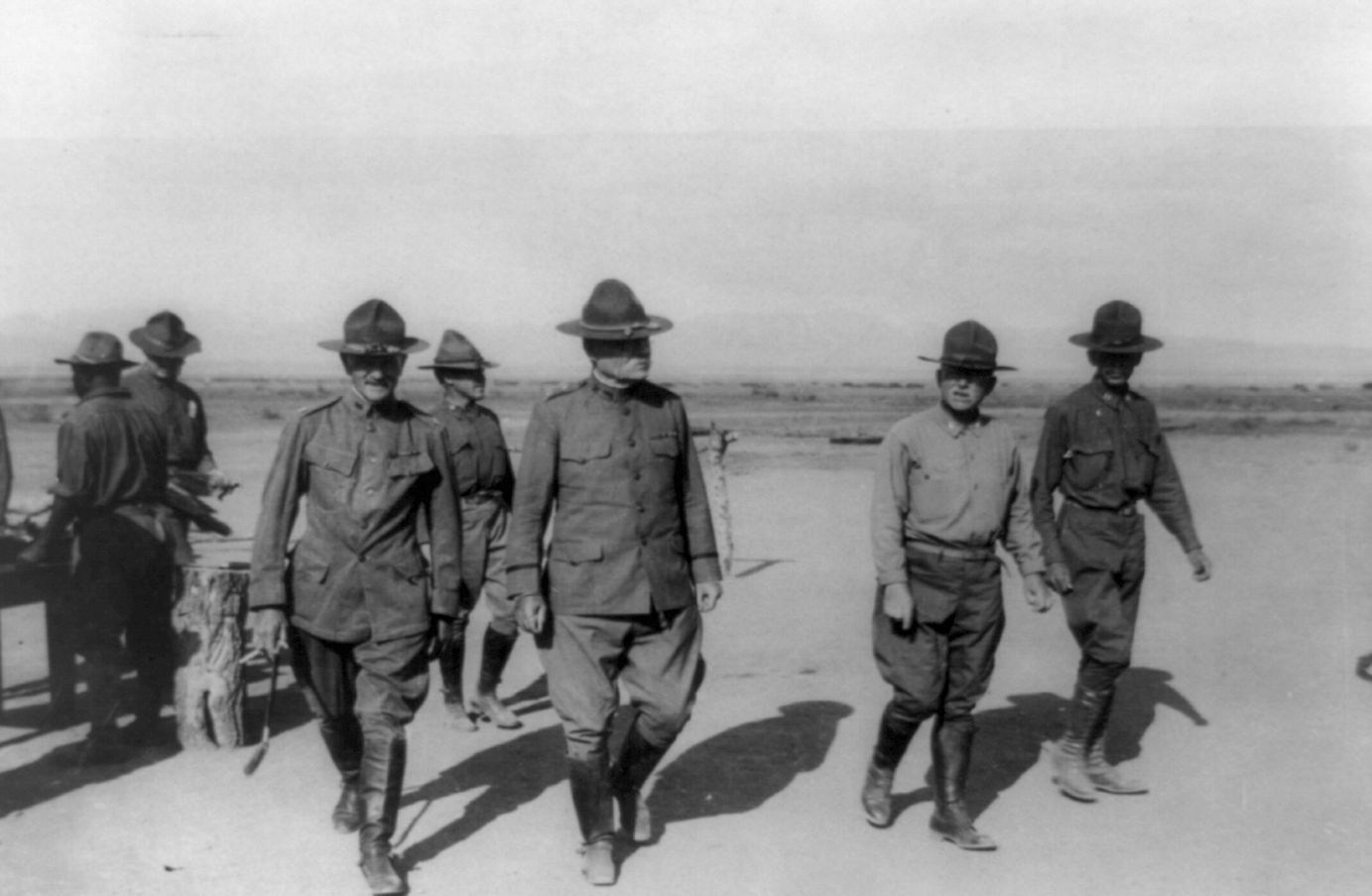
U.S. Army General John J. Pershing during the 1917 Mexican Punitive Expedition searching for Pancho Villa where a large number of Chinese Mexican American soldiers participated.

In the early 20th century, while the rest of the world was engulfed in the depths of World War I, the U.S. was looking to its south. Mexico had been embroiled in a civil war since 1910, and in 1916 the violence spilt north over the border when Pancho Villa raided Columbus, New Mexico, killing 16 Americans. This culminated with a U.S. response, officially known as the Mexican Expedition, led by Major General John Pershing. A large number Chinese Mexicans assisted U.S. forces in Mexico during the expedition and upon its completion in early 1917, they were threatened with hanging by Villa. Despite the provisions of the Chinese Exclusion Act, Pershing sought permission for these people to be allowed to resettle in the U.S. A total of 527 eventually entered the country, settling mostly in San Antonio, and they later became known as "Pershing's Chinese".

=== World War I ===
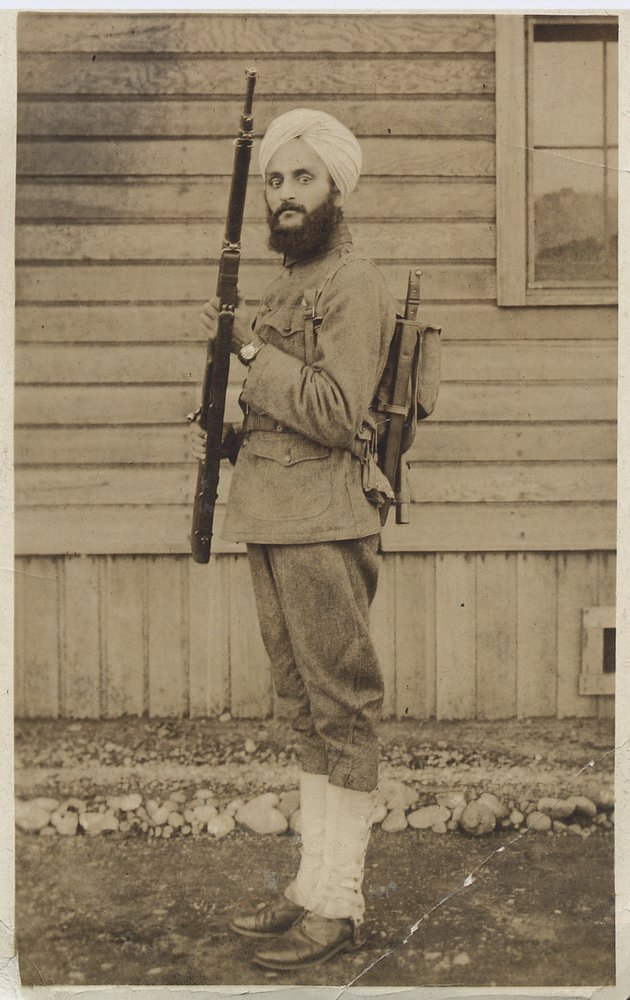
During World War I, Indian American Bhagat Singh Thind, who served in the U.S. Army, was promoted to sergeant and was stationed at Camp Lewis, Washington in 1918. Thind, a Sikh, was the first U.S. serviceman to be allowed for religious reasons to wear a turban as part of their military uniform.

In April 1917, the U.S. entered World War I on the side of the Allies. The U.S. Insular Government of the Philippine Islands created its own national guard units to join the effort, but did not see combat. The units were demobilized at Camp Thomas Claudio in 1918. Within the United States, a draft was started, and alongside Hispanic and Native Americans, Asian Americans were drafted as "non-whites" filling out the "white quota" in the National Army. The majority of Asian Americans did not see combat. Indian American Bhagat Singh Thind served in the U.S. Army and was stationed at Camp Lewis, Washington in 1918. Thind a Sikh was the first U.S. serviceman to be allowed for religious reasons to wear a turban as part of their military uniform. A few saw combat. Private Tomas Mateo Claudio, who had studied at the University of Nevada and became the first, and only, Filipino American to die during the war, being killed at Château-Thierry in 1918; Private Henry Chinn who was killed in action in the Argonne Forest while serving in the "Lost Battalion"; Sergeant Sing Kee, another member of the Lost Battalion, who was awarded the Distinguished Service Cross; and Sergeant Major Tokutaro Nishimura Slocum who served in the 328th Infantry Regiment, 82d Infantry Division. In the Navy, the number of enlisted Filipinos peaked at more than 5,700 by the end of the war. Several thousand Chinese, Japanese, Korean, Vietnamese, and Filipinos eventually served in the U.S. military during World War I.

Many Asian American military veterans were allowed to become naturalized citizens. For instance, some Filipino participants were allowed to become naturalized citizens. but others had to overcome numerous legal obstacles. For example, although many Japanese aliens in America volunteered during World War I under the belief that they would be eligible for naturalization, 400 Japanese immigrant veterans in Hawaii who were initially allowed to be naturalized in 1919 had their citizenship rescinded in 1922. Notably, Hidemitsu "Harry" Toyota, who had served in the US Army for seven years, had his petition for naturalization brought before the US Supreme Court, but in 1925 the court ruled in Hidemitsu Toyota v. United States that "a person of the Japanese race may not be naturalized". It was not until 1935, with the passage of the Nye-Lea Act, that the 400 Japanese immigrant veterans who had had their citizenship revoked, along with 100 other Asian immigrants, were successfully naturalized. Another example, Cesario Agudo Buensuceso (a Filipino American who resided in Chicago after the war), initially attempted to naturalize after serving during World War I, but was denied in 1924; it was not until after World War II that he was able to naturalize.

=== Interwar period ===
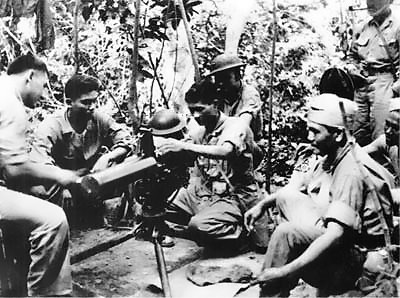
Filipino aviation cadets being trained by a U.S. Marine on use of a M1917 Browning machine gun in the Philippine Islands

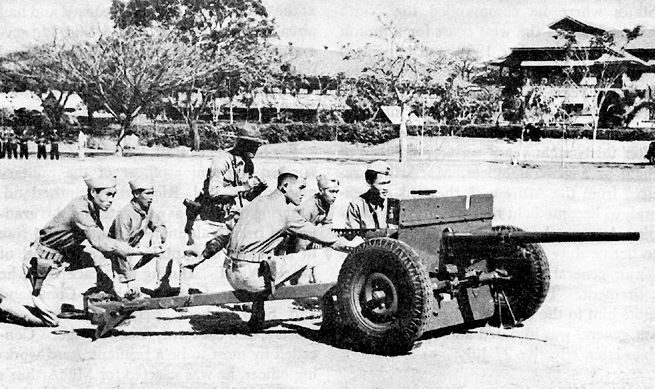
U.S. Army Philippine Scouts at Fort William McKinley, Philippine Islands firing a 37mm anti-tank gun in training.

During the interwar period, U.S. forces were involved in several minor actions, including the Russian Civil War and multiple events in the Caribbean that have since become known as the Banana Wars; also, the Yangtze Patrol was directly and indirectly affected by the Second Sino-Japanese War and other events. Between 1918 and 1933, at least 3,900 Filipino Americans served in the U.S. Navy at any given time as mess stewards, having largely replaced African Americans in that rating. Up to World War I, Filipino sailors were able to serve in a range of occupations in the U.S. Navy; however, after World War I, a rule restricted Filipinos to the ratings of officer's steward and mess attendant. These restrictions did not extend to the Insular Force, which was limited to 500 individuals from Guam or the Philippines.

In 1934, Gordon Pai'ea Chung-Hoon became the first Asian American U.S. citizen to graduate from the Naval Academy, and the first Asian American West Point graduate, Wing Fook Jung, graduated in 1940. In 1940, Japanese Americans were the largest ethnicity of Asian Americans, followed by (in order of population) Chinese Americans, Filipino Americans, Hindu Americans, and Korean Americans.

In 1937, the Second Sino-Japanese War began. A Chinese American, Arthur Chin, had gone to China in 1934 and joined the Republic of China Air Force, and flew as a fighter pilot. During the war Chin becoming the first American flying ace of World War II, with eight victories. He was later awarded the Distinguished Service Cross and the Air Medal.

In September 1939, war broke out in Europe following the German invasion of Poland. The U.S. officially remained neutral, but Americans became involved in combat while serving in other countries' militaries in units such as the Flying Tigers in China and the Eagle Squadrons that served with the Royal Air Force shortly after the Battle of Britain; U.S. forces also provided logistic support through the cash and carry program, and by undertaking convoy escort duties in the Atlantic. Following the Japanese attack on Pearl Harbor in December 1941, the U.S. officially declared war, and from that point on Asian Americans were on the front lines as U.S. civilians. Asian Americans from Oahu, including Japanese Americans, assisted with aid efforts following the attack. On the other side of the Pacific Ocean, Philippine Commonwealth forces, under U.S. command since July 1941, prepared for an attack that would come nine hours later.

=== World War II ===
==== Japanese Americans ====
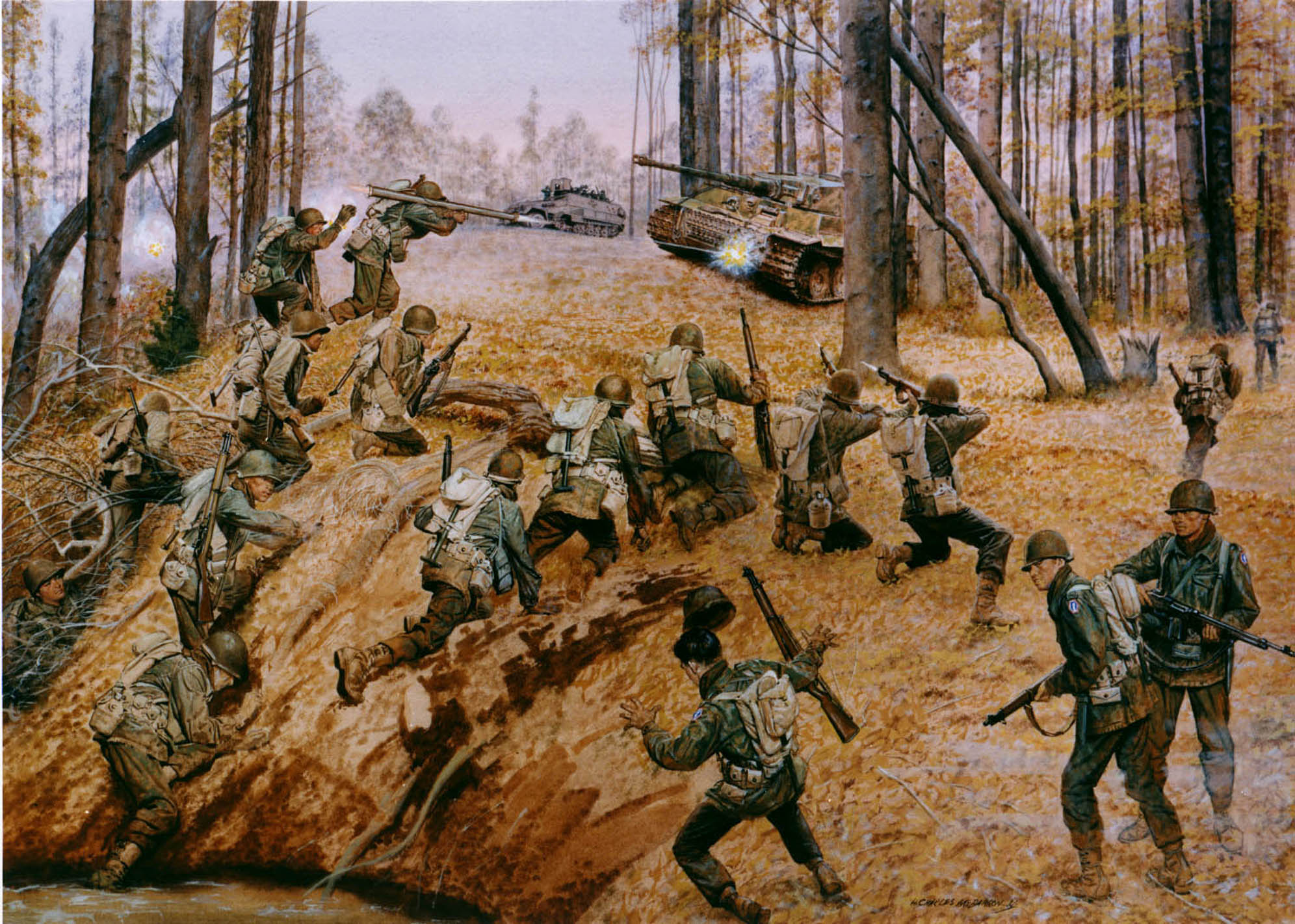
Don Troiani painting depicting Asian American soldiers of the Nisei Japanese-American U.S. Army 442nd Regimental Combat Team fighting in the Vosges mountains of Italy during World War II, where many received the Medal of Honor

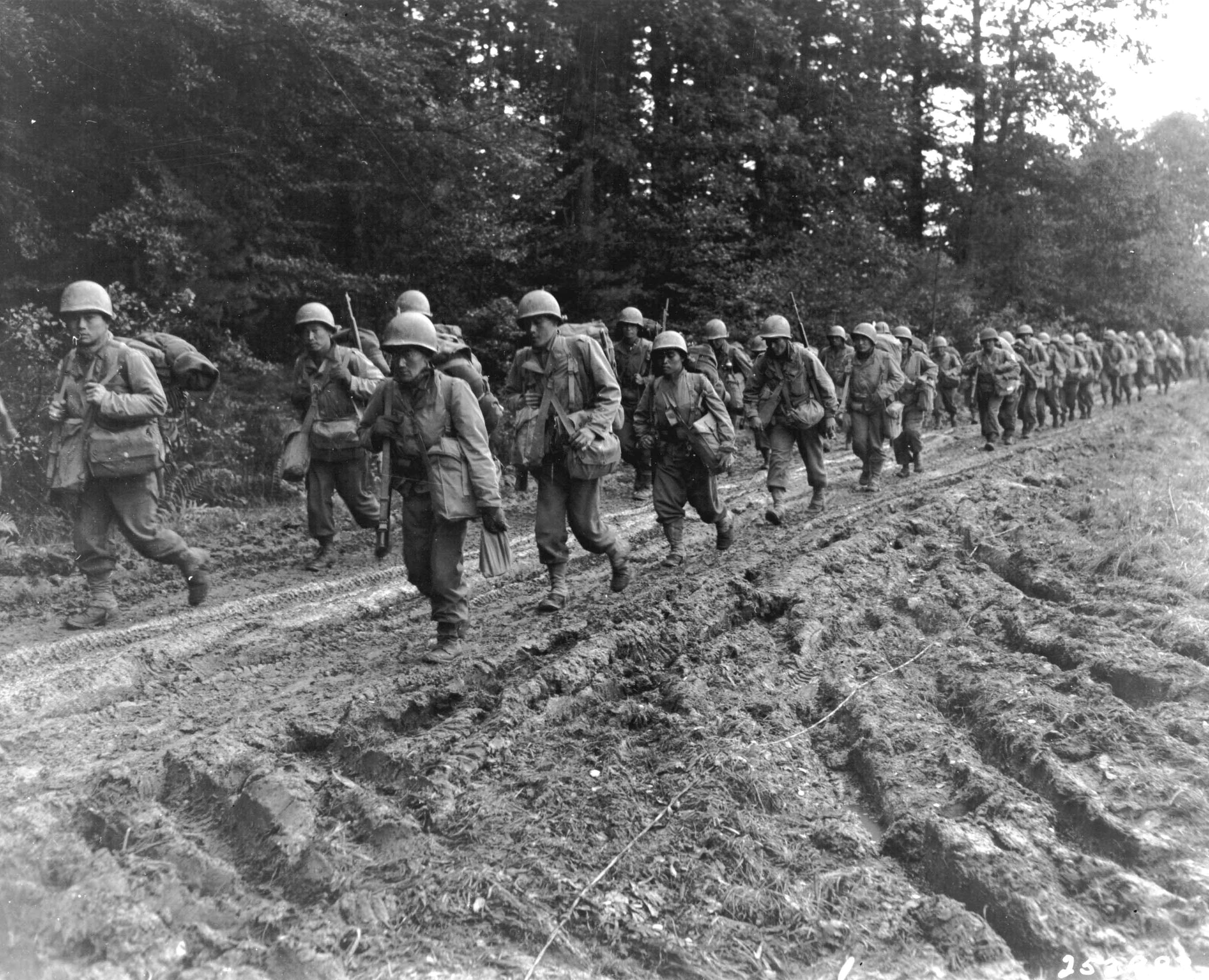
U.S. Army 442nd Regimental Combat Team marching in Chambois Sector, France, in late 1944

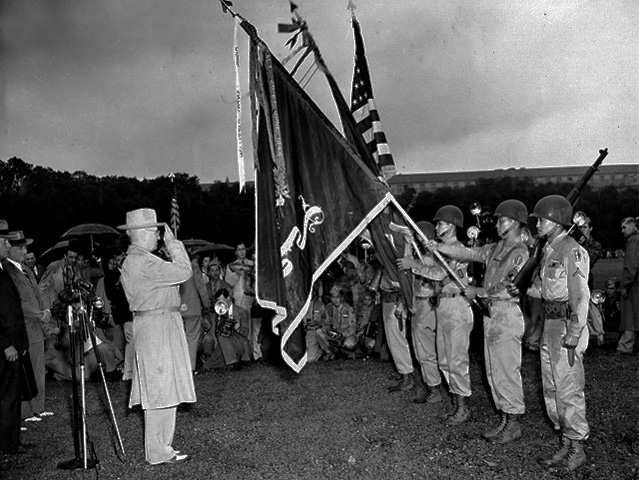
President Truman salutes the colors of the combined 100th Battalion and 442nd Infantry, during the presentation of the unit's seventh Presidential Unit Citation.

Following the attack on Pearl Harbor, Japanese Americans in the Hawaii National Guard activated and began to guard the beaches, clear rubble, donate blood and aid the wounded but three days later, they were disarmed because of their ancestry. The next day, however, they were authorized to rearm, but an uneasy tension lasted until 5 June 1942. At the same time, Japanese Americans who had been undertaking the ROTC program at the University of Hawaii, and who had been activated in the Hawaii Territorial Guard, were discharged on 19 January 1942. Many of these discharged soldiers formed a Corps of Engineers auxiliary, known as the "Varsity Victory Volunteers", in February 1942. On 5 June 1942, 1,400 Nisei of the Hawaii National Guard shipped out from Hawaii bound for Oakland and on 12 June, after docking, they were formed into the 100th Infantry Battalion. Afterwards, all Japanese American men, not already in the military, were classified as enemy aliens; this policy was reversed in 1943.

Eight months later the decision was made to raise an all-Nisei regiment, known as the 442nd Regimental Combat Team. Progress was slow at first, and another four months passed before the 442nd began training; two months after that, though, the 100th shipped out to Europe. Initially, the notion of employing Japanese American soldiers was rejected by General Dwight D. Eisenhower's staff at the Supreme Headquarters Allied Expeditionary Force, but they were eventually accepted by Lieutenant General Mark Clark's Fifth Army. While the 442nd was training in the U.S., the 100th sustained heavy losses, eventually earning the title the "Purple Heart Battalion." On 26 June 1944, two weeks after the 442nd arrived in Europe, the two Nisei units combined to form one single unit, but those who had been a part of the 100th wanted to keep their numerical designation, so they replaced the regiment's 1st Battalion. Keeping with the policy at the time, the unit was segregated, and large number of the other members of the 442nd RCT were previously interned Japanese Americans from the continental United States, commanded by mostly white officers. The combat chronicle of the regiment became a highly storied one, resulting in it becoming one of the most decorated units in the European Theater, taking part in numerous actions in Italy, France and Germany, including the liberation of Dachau concentration camp. (Note: In doing so, the 522nd Field Artillery Battalion, halted the death march from Dachau, two days after Hitler's suicide.)

The 442nd Regiment was the most decorated unit for its size and length of service in the history of American warfare. The 4,000 men who initially made up the unit in April 1943 had to be replaced nearly 2.5 times. In total, about 14,000 men served, earning 9,486 Purple Hearts. The unit was awarded eight Presidential Unit Citations (five earned in one month).

Additionally, Japanese Americans also contributed to the war effort in the Pacific Front serving in the Military Intelligence Service, helping with the decoding of Japanese intelligence and the rebuilding of occupied Japan; the first Asian American women to enter the U.S. military served within this unit through the Women's Army Corps. More than a dozen volunteers from the 442nd were selected to join the Office of Strategic Services and were selected for service in India and Burma, where they conducted covert operations, translation, interrogation, and signal intelligence. Over 33,000 Japanese Americans served in the military during World War II. Upon returning home, Japanese American service members found old prejudices remained.

In 1946, one of the 442nd's soldiers, PFC Sadao Munemori, was posthumously awarded the Medal of Honor for his actions during the regiment's service in Italy. His award was one of two made to Asian Americans during, or in the immediate aftermath of, the war, and the only one made to a Japanese American. However, in 2000, after a review of other medals awarded to the 442nd, 21 were elevated to Medals of Honor. One of those 21 was presented to Hawaiʻi Senator, and former captain, Daniel K. Inouye. On 5 October 2010, Congress created the Congressional Gold Medal recognizing the 442nd Regimental Combat Team and the 100th Infantry Battalion, as well as the 6,000 Japanese Americans who served in the Military Intelligence Service during the war.

==== Chinese Americans ====
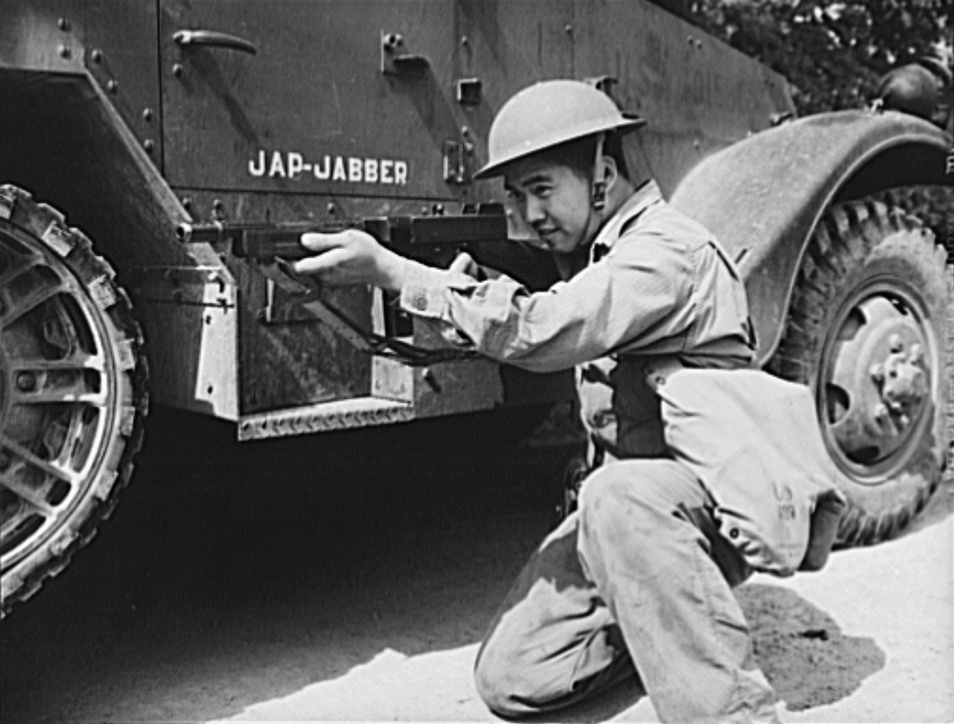
Chinese American soldier training at Fort Knox, Kentucky

It has been estimated that between 12,000 and 20,000 Chinese American men, representing up to 22 percent of the men in their portion of the U.S. population, served during World War II. Of those serving about 40 percent were not citizens, and unlike Japanese and Filipino Americans, 75 percent served in non-segregated units. Chinese Americans distinguished themselves from Japanese Americans, and suffered less discrimination. A quarter of those would serve in the U.S. Army Air Forces, some of which were sent to the Chinese-Burma-India theater for service with the 14th Air Service Group and the Chinese-American Composite Wing. Another 70 percent would go on to serve in the U.S. Army in various units, including the 3rd, 4th, 6th, 32nd and 77th Infantry Divisions. Prior to the war, the U.S. Navy had recruited Chinese Americans but they had been restricted to serve only as stewards; this continued until May 1942, when restrictions ceased and they were allowed to serve in other ratings. In 1943, Chinese American women were accepted into the Women's Army Corps in the Military Intelligence Service. They were also recruited for service in the Army Air Force, with a few later becoming civilian Women Airforce Service Pilots.

Captain Francis Wai of the 34th Infantry was posthumously awarded the Distinguished Service Cross for actions on the island of Leyte in late 1944; this awarding was later elevated to a Medal of Honor in the 2000 review. Wilbur Carl Sze became the first Chinese American officer commissioned in the Marine Corps.

==== Filipino Americans ====
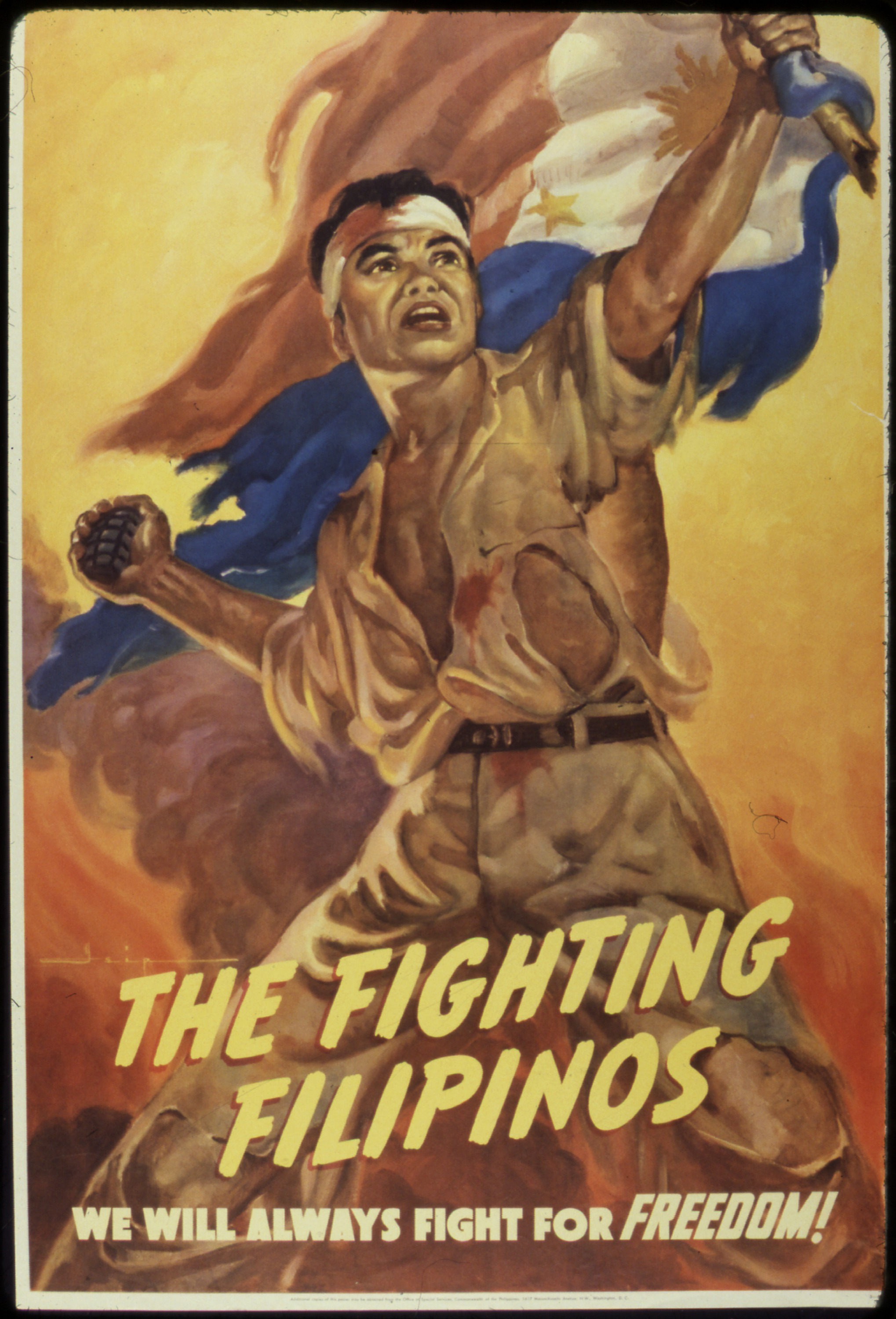
World War II propaganda poster depicting the Philippine resistance movement against the Japanese occupation of the Philippines.

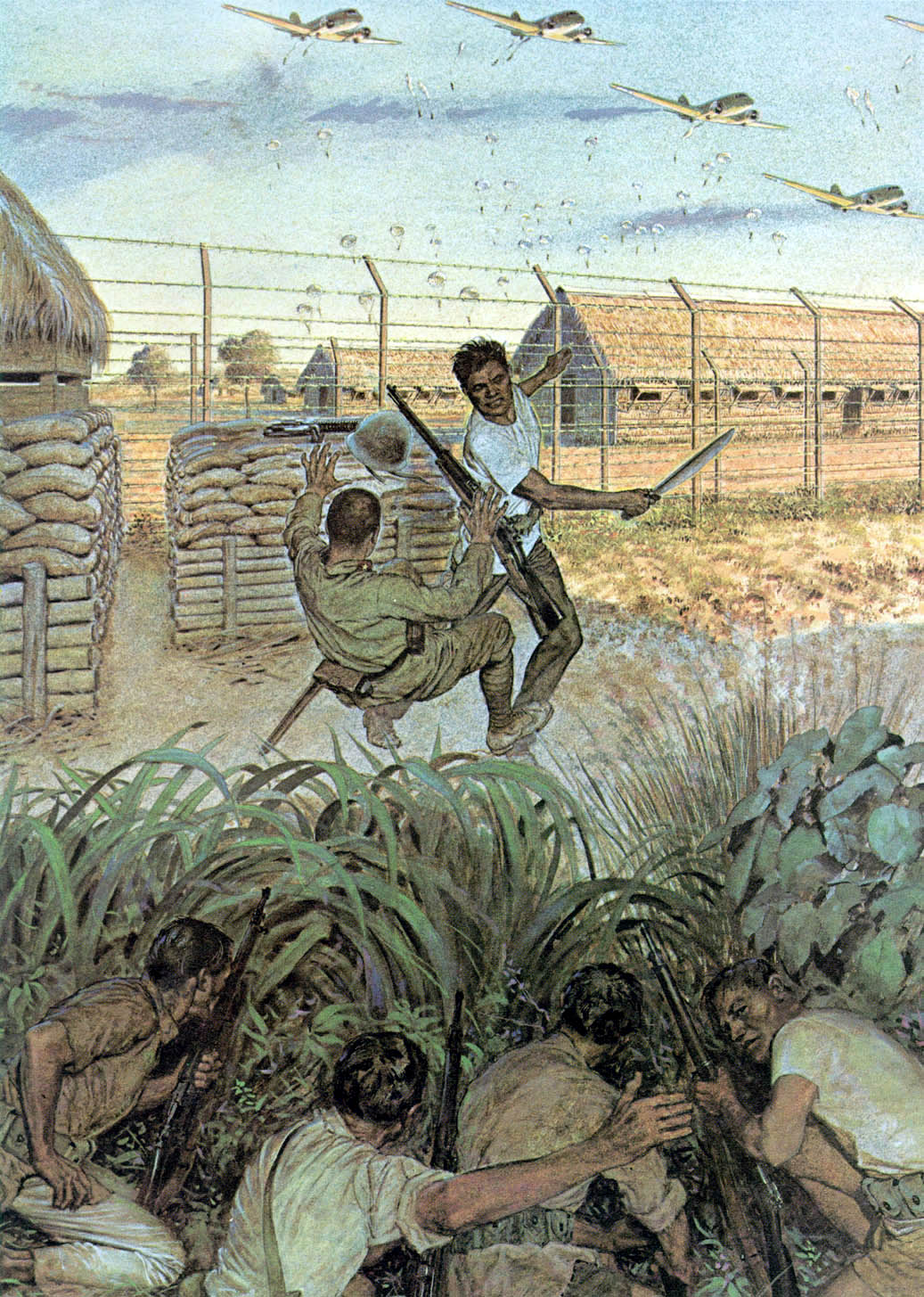
Don Troiani painting depicting the Filipino guerrillas' Raid at Los Baños during World War II

From the beginning, the Philippines was on the front lines of the new war, as it was attacked shortly after Pearl Harbor. Under the command of General Douglas MacArthur, initially plans were made to defend all of the islands, but following the Japanese landings on Luzon, the US reinstated War Plan Orange and a hasty withdrawal to the Bataan Peninsula followed, denying Japan the use of Manila Bay. In March 1942, under orders from President Franklin D. Roosevelt, MacArthur departed the Philippines. In April 1942, Major General Edward P. King surrendered his force as they could no longer keep up a sustainable defense. Of the 75,000 that surrendered, about 63,000 were Filipinos, and a thousand were Chinese Filipinos. Forced to march to San Fernando, Pampanga, in what later came to be called the Bataan Death March, between 5,000 and 10,000 Filipinos died along the way. A smaller force held out at Fort Mills; however, after an assault, Lieutenant General Jonathan Wainwright surrendered the USAFFE forces that remained in the Philippines in May 1942. Of those who surrendered, 23 were Filipino officers who had graduated from West Point; Japanese forces executed six of these Filipino prisoners of war, including Vicente Lim, who had by then reached the rank of brigadier general.

In the U.S., Filipinos were initially blocked from enlisting, until the laws were revised a day before Japan had begun its invasion back in the Philippines. Of the Filipinos who lived in California, two-fifths, or sixteen thousand Filipinos, attempted to enlist into the U.S. Army. Some would serve in non-segregated units, yet a segregated infantry battalion was established, which continued to grow and at its peak was split into two units known as the 1st and 2nd Filipino Infantry Regiments. These soldiers were subjected to discrimination during their time training at Camp Beale and Fort Ord, sometimes being mistaken for Japanese Americans when off base. Nevertheless, these units would serve with distinction similar to that of the 442d Infantry Regiment, although their deeds were not as well documented or widely known. By the end of the war, a total of 50,000 decorations, awards, medals, ribbons, certificates, commendations and citations had been awarded to personnel assigned to these two regiments for their service in the New Guinea and Philippines campaigns.

Back in the Philippines, some individual service members and units refused to heed orders to surrender. They began a guerilla campaign to resist the Japanese occupation and were later joined by paroled Filipino USAFFE soldiers, as well as Filipino civilians, and other Allied forces that had been inserted into the islands. Allied forces returned to the Philippines in significant numbers during the Battle of Leyte. These included the Filipino infantry units which had been reduced in size from their peak. Later that year the Philippine Division was reconstituted, and in 1945 those members who elected to remain in the Philippines at the end of the war were transferred to the PC AUS. In all approximately 142,000 Filipinos served during World War II. When recognized guerrillas are taken into account, the number of Filipinos who served increases to over 250,000, and possibly up to over 400,000. This number though is smaller than that recognized for serving in World War II by the Philippines.

Sergeant Jose Calugas became the third Asian American ever and first Asian American during World War II, to receive the Medal of Honor; he would not receive the medal until after the occupation had ended. Later, in the 2000 review of medals awarded to Asian Americans, First Lieutenant Rudolph Davila's Distinguished Service Cross was elevated to a Medal of Honor. While in New Guinea, Lieutenant Colonel Leon Punsalang became the first Asian American to command white troops in combat. For their actions in aiding Allied prisoners of war during the Japanese Occupation of the Philippines, Josefina Guerrero and Florence Finch were both awarded the Medal of Freedom; Finch later enlisted in the Coast Guard Women's Reserve after being liberated from the Philippines and taken to New York.

==== Korean Americans ====
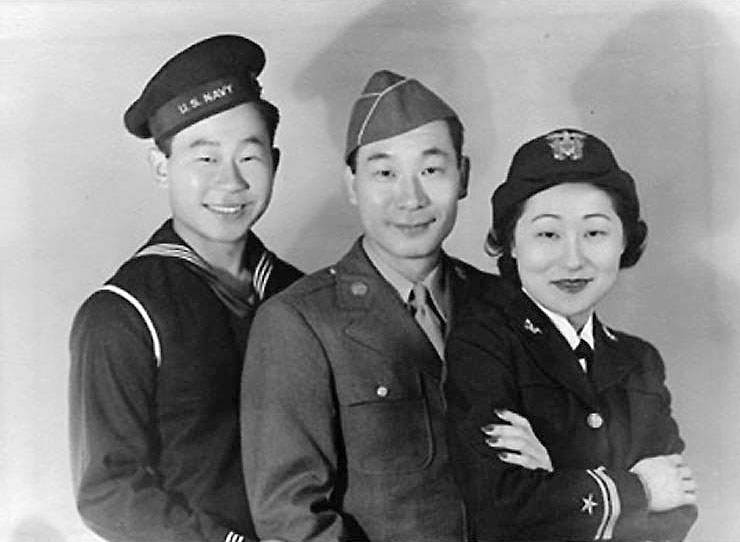
Ahn family portrait Korean Americans who served in World War II

After a treaty was signed in 1882, Koreans had begun migrating to the U.S. This came to an end when Japan annexed Korea in 1910. When the war began, Korean Americans were treated as enemy aliens, although this changed in 1943, when they were exempted from enemy alien status. About 100 enlisted in the U.S. Army over the course of the war, some of whom served as translators. Over a hundred joined the California State Guard in Los Angeles alone and formed a unit that became known as the "Tiger Brigade". Young-Oak Kim, who had initially been rejected by the Army before being drafted, served as an enlisted soldier in the engineers until he was selected for commissioning in 1943. He went on to serve in the mainly Japanese American 442nd Infantry Regiment, and he was subsequently awarded the Distinguished Service Cross for his actions at the Battle of Anzio. The only Korean American to be awarded that medal during the war, he also received a Silver Star and Purple Heart for actions earlier in the campaign. Fred Ohr, who initially enlisted as a trooper in the 116th Cavalry in 1938, became the only Korean American fighter ace of World War II, shooting down a total of six enemy aircraft and eventually rising to command the 52nd Fighter Group's 2d Fighter Squadron in the Mediterranean Theater of Operations. As of 8 March 2012, he is the only Korean American to achieve the status of ace, and for his actions, Ohr received several medals including the Silver Star with one bronze oak leaf cluster.

=== Cold War ===
==== Post World War II ====
After the surrender of Japan, World War II came to an end, and the U.S. military began to demobilize. Millions of service-members were transported home, including the 442nd Regimental Combat Team. In 1946, the regiment was reviewed by President Truman who awarded them their seventh Distinguished Unit Citation. They were subsequently deactivated, but they were reorganized a year later as part of the U.S. Army Reserve. That same year, Truman signed the Rescission Act of 1946, which denied Filipinos who served during World War II in the Commonwealth military and guerrillas, benefits that were afforded to other veterans. With the consent of the Philippine government, 50,000 Philippine Scouts were authorized by Congress, retained, and recruited. As part of the Philippine Division, this force undertook occupation duty on Okinawa until 1947, when the Philippine Scouts were disbanded by presidential order after Truman came to view them as a mercenary organization. In 1947, the signing of the U.S.-Philippine Military Bases Agreement formalized Filipino enlistment in the U.S. Navy without immigrant credentials. In 1948, Truman ordered the desegregation of the U.S. military.

==== Korean War ====
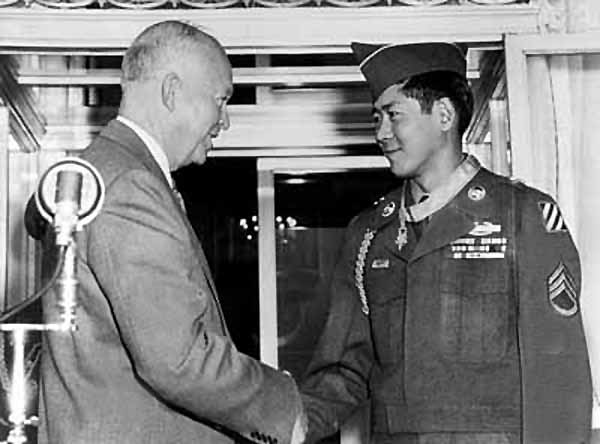
Staff Sergeant Hiroshi Miyamura, a Japanese American U.S. Army soldier and POW with President Eisenhower, after receiving the Medal of Honor in 1953 for meritorious service in the Korean War

Following Truman's order for the integration of the U.S. military, the majority of segregated Asian American units were disbanded by 1951. Many individuals continued to serve in integrated units following desegregation, although the exact number of Asian Americans who served during the Korean War has not been determined. Despite the official acceptance of the desegregation policy, some units, including the 100th Battalion, 442nd Infantry Regiment, and the 5th Regimental Combat Team, retained strong racial ties, with a predominant number of Asian Americans serving in these units. Of the 36,572 who died during the Korean War, 241 were Asian Americans.

One Asian American received the Medal of Honor for actions during the Korean War. This went to Japanese American Corporal Hiroshi Miyamura of the 7th Infantry Regiment; the awarding of the medal was initially made in secret, as at the time Miyamura was being held by North Koreans as a prisoner of war. Three brothers, Kurt Chew-Een Lee (the first Chinese American Marine officer), Chew-Mon Lee (an army infantry officer), and Chew-Fan Lee (an army medical service officer), all served in different units during the conflict and were awarded the Navy Cross, Distinguished Service Cross, and Bronze Star Medal respectively. Young-Oak Kim, having reenlisted and promoted to major, became the first ethnic minority to command a regular combat battalion, the 1st of the 31st Infantry. Walter Tsukamoto, who was first commissioned in 1927 and entered active duty in 1943, was sent from occupation duty in Japan to Korea in 1950 and was promoted to lieutenant colonel, the first Asian American to achieve that rank in the Army Judge Advocate General's Corps, served as the senior ranking judge advocate for X Corps and was awarded two Bronze Star Medals for his service in Korea.

==== Vietnam War ====
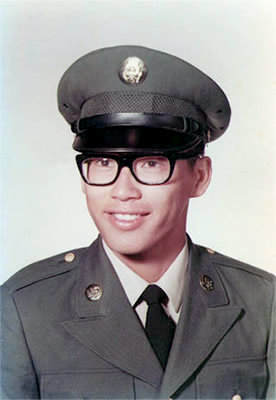
Corporal Terry Kawamura a Japanese American U.S. Army soldier was with the 173rd Engineer Company, 173rd Airborne Brigade posthumously received the Medal of Honor for actions in 1969 at Camp Radcliff, Bình Định Province, South Vietnam.

During the Vietnam War 35,000 Asian Americans served as part of the more than eight million U.S. service personnel that were deployed to South Vietnam, in fully integrated units. Three of them were posthumously awarded the Medal of Honor, including Corporal Terry Kawamura who was, as of March 2014, the last Asian American to receive that medal. During the conflict, in addition to the Asian American personnel who served in conventional units, the Army also formed a special forces team of Chinese, Filipino, Japanese, and Native American Rangers called Team Hawaii, as they could pass for Vietnamese and conduct long range reconnaissance. Discrimination and racism continued to be experienced by Asian Americans who served during the conflict. Their loyalty was questioned, and during basic training they were sometimes described as being similar to Viet Cong. In country, some were fired upon when mistaken for Viet Cong, and some had medical care delayed after being mistaken for North Vietnamese. Additionally, the Viet Cong especially targeted Asian American service members, sometimes putting a price on their heads. Proportionally, Asian Americans suffered fewer casualties compared to other ethnic groups in Vietnam, with a total of 139 Asian American servicemen dying during the conflict.

Many other then-future Asian Americans serve the military out of its normal ranks during the conflict. These included groups such as the Hmong and Laotians who fought alongside American service members in the Laotian Civil War, Vietnamese Americans who fought as members of the South Vietnam's armed forces, and Montagnard (also known as Degar) who assisted American forces.

Throughout the war, Filipino American sailors remained restricted to the rating of steward, with 80% of the almost seventeen thousand Filipino American sailors being stewards. In 1970, there were more Filipinos serving in the U.S. Navy than there were in the Philippine Navy; that same year, the number of Filipinos recruited into the United States Navy was reduced from the thousands per year down to 35 a month, while Filipinos re-enlistment rates were 95% (which made them eligible for naturalization). The rating restriction ended in 1973, after the U.S. Senate investigated civil rights issues in the U.S. Navy and opened all ratings to Filipino Americans. In the White House, Filipinos Navy stewards continued to serve as valets after the restriction was lifted, as late as into the 1990s. A few years later, in 1976, there were over seventeen thousand Filipino Americans in the U.S. Navy, including just under a hundred officers. By 1989, Asian Americans made up approximately 2.3 percent of the total armed services, slightly greater than their proportion of the total U.S. population at that time (1.6 percent).

=== Persian Gulf War ===
During the Persian Gulf War, many Asian Americans served in the U.S. military, with some filling senior officer positions, including Major General John Fugh who was promoted to the position of Army Judge Advocate General during the conflict. One Asian American service member died during the conflict.

In 1992, the U.S. Navy stopped recruiting Filipino nationals due to the end of the 1947 Military Bases Agreement.

== 21st century ==
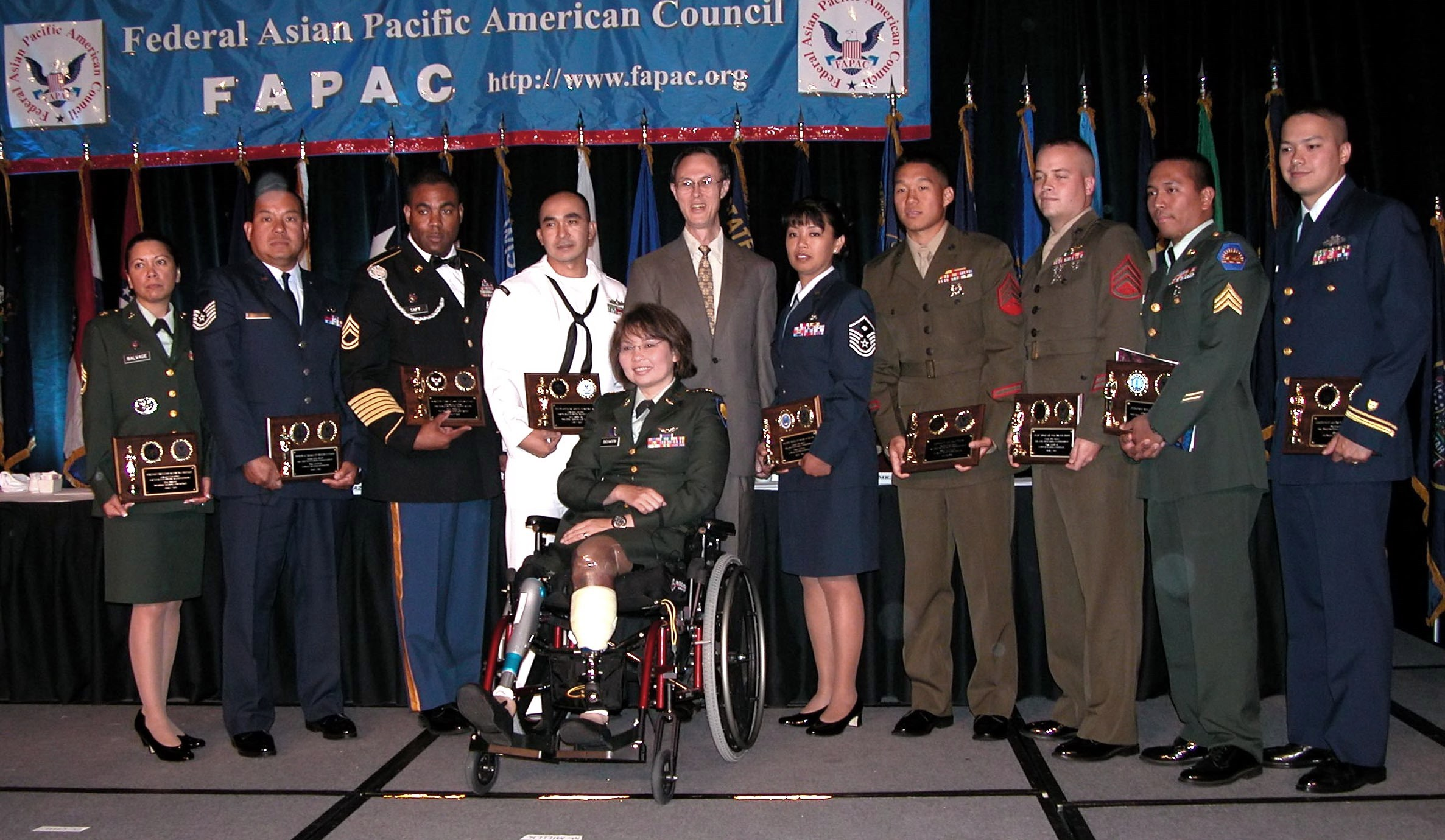
Asian American service members at a Department of Defense Asian Pacific American Heritage Month luncheon in Arlington, Virginia

Recent trends show that Asian Americans, particularly those from California, are enlisting at rates greater than their proportion of population; they are more likely to take up non-combat jobs. In 2009, the Army had Asian Americans serving as 4.4 percent of its commissioned officers, and 3.5 percent of its enlisted personnel. In 2008, Filipinos made up the largest immigrant population servicing in the U.S. Military, with Korean immigrants also serving in significant numbers. In 2010, Asian Americans made up 3.7 percent of active duty service members, mostly in the Army and Navy, and 3.9 percent of the officers. In 2012, there were about 65,000 immigrants serving in the U.S. armed forces; of those, about 23 percent were from the Philippines. Due to the numerous Filipinos serving in the Navy, when seen together, they've been described as the "Filipino Mafia". As of 2018, Filipinos made up the largest immigrant population serving in the U.S. Military. That same year, it was found that Asian Americans are over represented in the military compared to their proportion of the total population, and were increasingly choosing to become commissioned officers over choosing to enlist. Yet in 2013, it was found that Asian Americans are under represented in the Marine Corps, leading to a targeted effort to recruit more Asian Americans into the Corps.

=== War on terrorism ===
As of July 2026, out of the 2,346 deaths that have occurred in Operation Enduring Freedom, 62 have been Asian Americans (47 Soldiers, 8 Marines, 6 Sailors, and 1 Airman). As of July 2026, an additional 390 Asian American service-members have been wounded (307 Soldiers, 58 Marines, 18 Sailors, and 7 Airmen).

=== Afghanistan War ===
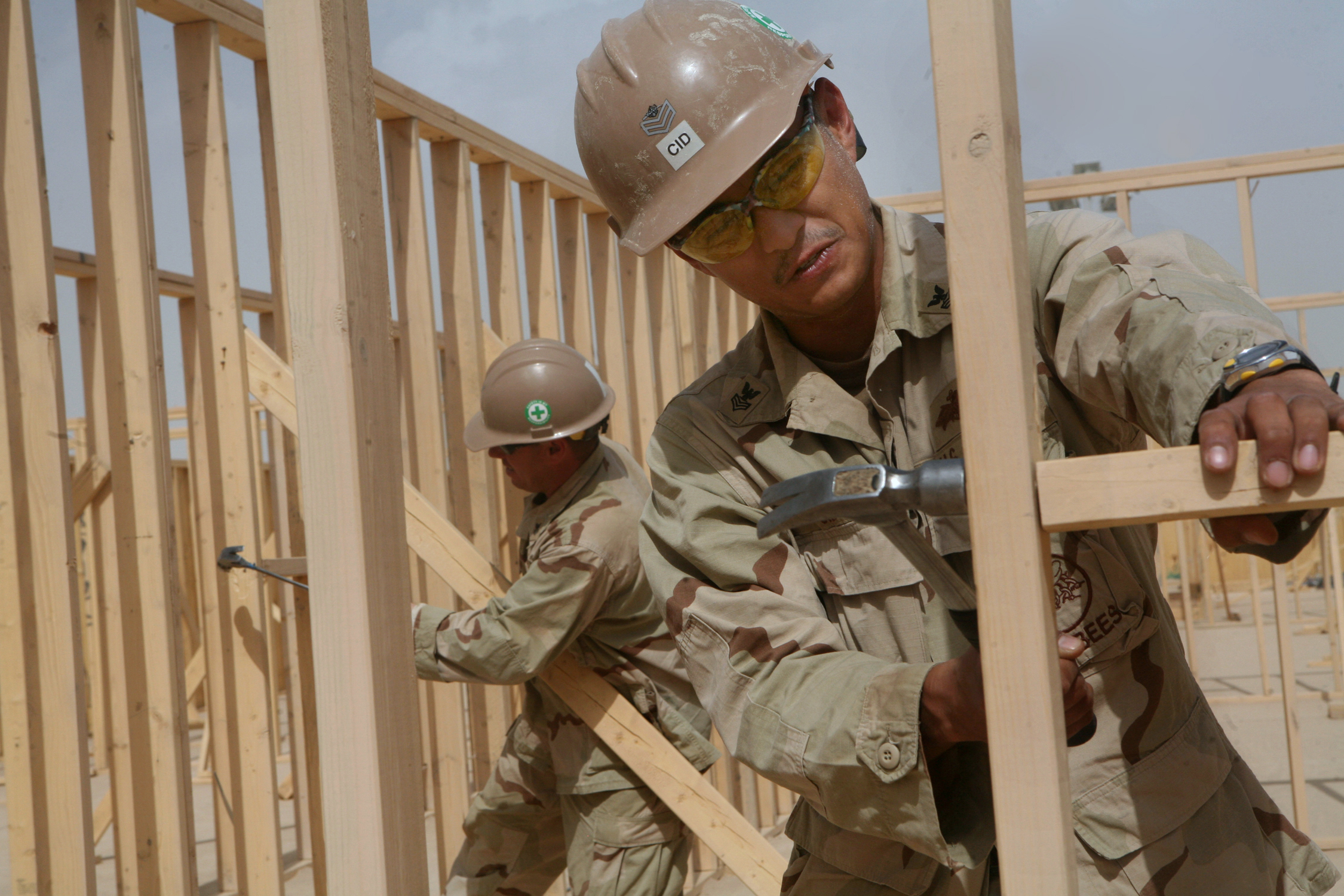
Two U.S. Navy Seabees who are Filipinos framing walls at Camp Leatherneck in Afghanistan

Asian American Marines were part of the first conventional units to enter into Afghanistan in late 2001; including Pakistani American marine LtCol Asad Khan. Khan would return to Afghanistan in command of 1st Battalion 6th Marines in 2004; only to be later relieved of command. In 2011, Private Danny Chen and Lance Corporal Harry Lew both committed suicide in Afghanistan following hazing; prosecution of several of their unit members followed. Also in 2011, Petty Officer third class Jonathan Kong, as a corpsman risked his life to save Corporal Michael Dawers who had been shot in a battle near the village of Kotozay; in 2014, Kong was awarded a Silver Star for his actions in 2011.

=== Iraq War ===
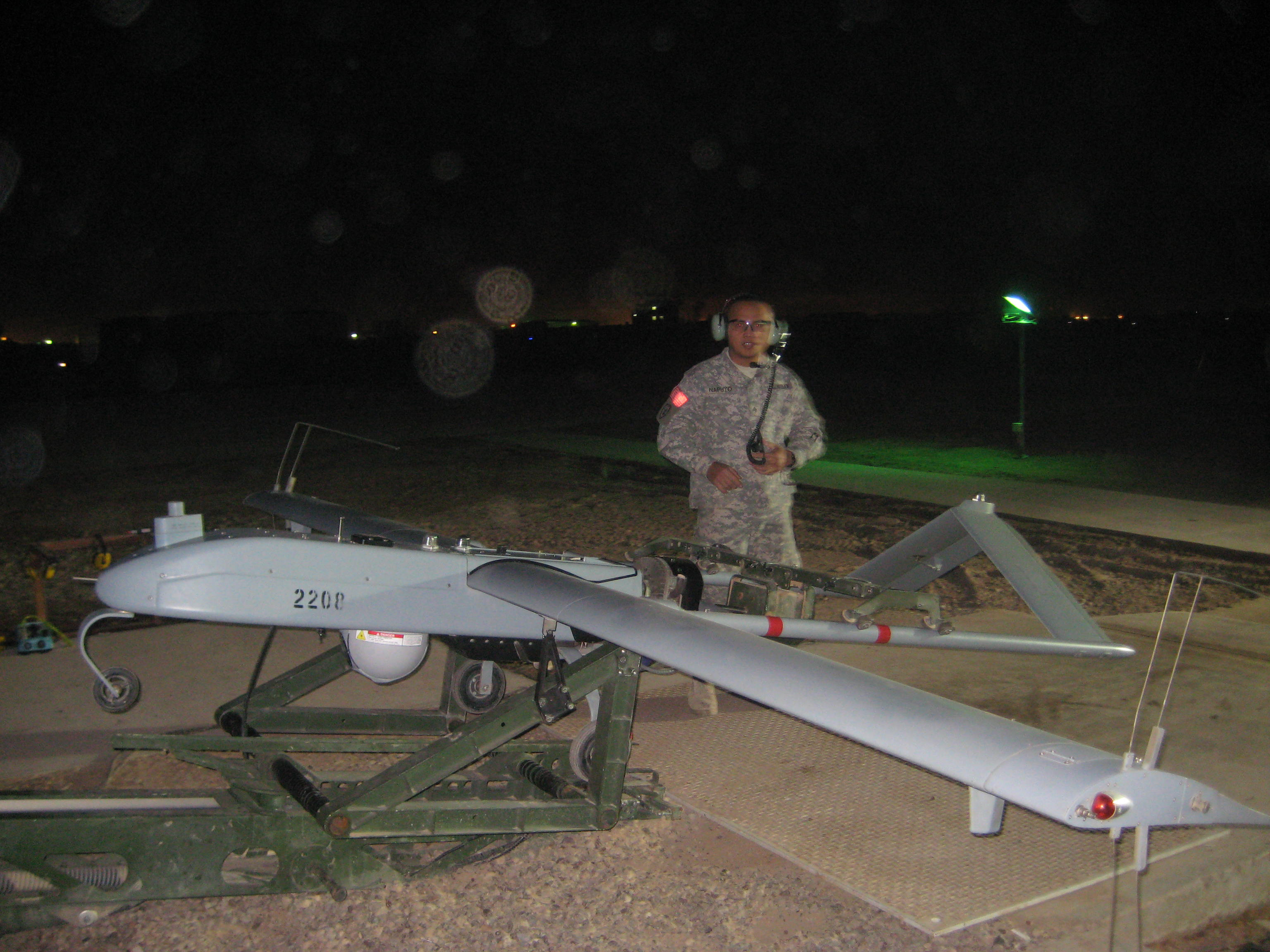
SGT Naputo with a RQ-7 at Camp Taji

Hundreds of Asian Americans have deployed to Iraq out of the 59,000 plus that are serving in active duty as of May 2009, with one study stating that 2.6 percent have been Asian American. The 100th Infantry Battalion (USAR) was activated in 2004 for its first deployment in Iraq, their first activation since the Vietnam War. At the end of that deployment the unit was authorized to wear the 442nd's sleeve insignia on the right shoulder, the first time this had occurred since World War II. The 100th Infantry Battalion was activated, and deployed to Iraq, for second time from 2008 to 2009. With Operation Iraqi Freedom and Operation New Dawn having ended, 78 Asian American service members died during the conflict. One of those who died was Staff Sergeant Emmanuel Legaspi, who was posthumously awarded the Silver Star Medal. Then Petty Officer Second Class Jonny Kim was awarded a Silver Star Medal for actions in 2006.

=== Iran War ===
An Asian American, Chief Warrant Officer 3 Robert Marzan, was killed in Kuwait during the 2026 Iran War. Additionally as of July 2026, an Asian American, has been wounded during the 2026 Iran war.

== Leadership ==
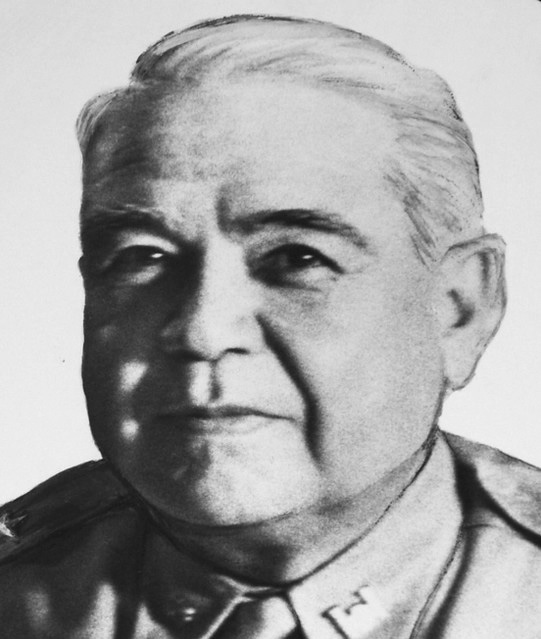
Brigadier General Albert Lyman, first Asian American general officer was of part Chinese and Hawaiian roots

The first Asian American general was Brigadier General Albert Lyman, who was part Chinese and Hawaiian American. He was followed by Rear Admiral Gordon Chung-Hoon, the first Asian American flag officer. The highest ranked is former Secretary of Veteran Affairs Eric Shinseki, who was a four-star general, and Army Chief of Staff.

In recent years, Asian Americans have been represented well at the military academies compared to their share of the national population. Although Asian/Pacific Islander Americans are 3.49% of the national population aged 18–24, they are about 9–10% of the classes of 2014 at West Point, the Naval Academy, and the Air Force Academy.

== In popular culture ==
The following television shows, movies, songs, and operas have depicted events that relate to this article:

- American Pastime
- An American Soldier
- Apocalypse Meow
- Bataan
- Captain America: The First Avenger
- Go for Broke!
- M*A*S*H episode:"Goodbye, Cruel World"
- Mr. Sunshine (South Korean TV series)
- Only the Brave
- The Great Raid
- The Karate Kid
- The Next Karate Kid
- The Steel Helmet
- The War
- We Were Soldiers
- Medal of Honor (TV series) episode: "Hiroshi 'Hershey' Miyamura"

== See also ==
- History of Asian Americans
- List of Asian Pacific American Medal of Honor recipients
- List of Asian Americans § Military
- Hawaii and the American Civil War
- Military history of the United States
- Military history of Pakistani Americans
- Military history of Sikh Americans
- Vietnamese American Armed Forces Association

=== Minority military history ===
- Military history of African Americans
- Hispanic and Latino Americans § Military
- Military history of Jewish Americans
- Native Americans in the American Civil War
- Native Americans and World War II

=== Asian American military units ===
- Alamo Scouts
- USS Lanikai
- USS Rizal
