= Chinese-American service in World War II =

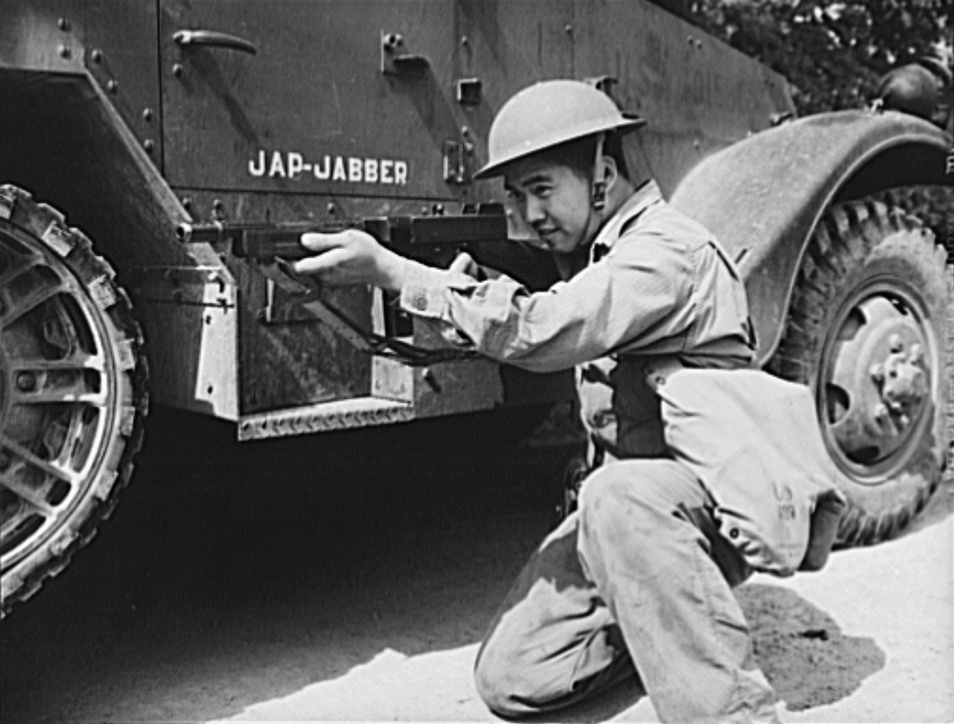
Chinese-American soldier training at Fort Knox, Kentucky

Many Chinese Americans enlisted in the United States military or served in defense industries during World War II. It has been estimated that around 12,000 to 15,000 Chinese American men, representing up to 20 percent of the Chinese American male population, served during the Second World War. Although the majority of Chinese American servicemen fought in non-segregated units (unlike other Asian American groups), all segregated units belonged to the 14th Air Service Group (the "Flying Tigers") or the 987th Signal Company. Chinese American women also served, including two Women Airforce Service Pilots and countless other women in defense industries. Service in World War II played a large role in increasing social acceptance for Chinese Americans, and many Chinese American veterans were able to expedite their naturalization and bring their foreign-born wives and children to the United States.

== Service ==
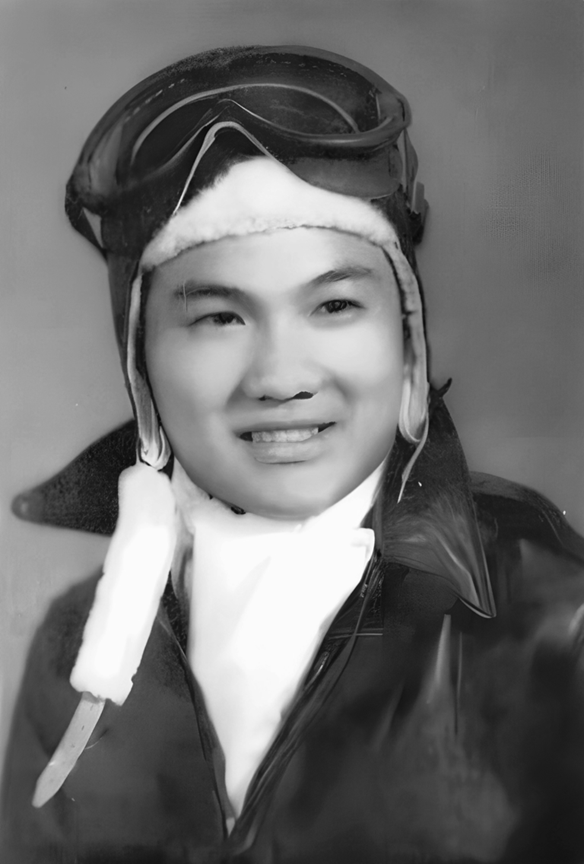
Chinese American Yuen Hop, who served as a staff sergeant in the 306th Bombardment Squadron during the Battle of the Bulge

=== Initial enlistment ===
Chinese Americans had been involved in raising relief for war victims since the Japanese invasion of China in 1937. Although Chinese Americans joined the draft before 1941, they were truly drawn in after the Japanese attack on Pearl Harbor and the United States. Chinese Americans were especially eager to serve, considering China's involvement and Generalissimo Chiang Kai-shek's call for overseas Chinese to fight for China. Many young Chinese American men saw enlistment as a path to acceptance and a way to express their patriotism and thus volunteered to serve in the military. Additionally, Chinese Americans were among the first to be drafted due to their lack of dependents on paper. Around 20% of Chinese American men served in the armed forces during the war, and approximately a quarter of those men served in the Army Air Forces. In the U.S. Navy, Chinese Americans had previously only served as stewards, but in 1942, restrictions ceased and they were allowed to serve in other ratings. An estimated 40 percent of Chinese-American soldiers were not native-born citizens.

=== Segregated units ===
Unlike many other Asian American groups, the majority of Chinese Americans in the armed forces served in non-segregated units. However, there were ten Chinese-American-majority units within the armed forces, nine of which were in the 14th Air Service Group. The last segregated unit was the 987th Signal Company. These units served in the China-Burma-India (CBI) theater, where the Army hoped that Chinese American servicemen would be able to bridge the gap between their own troops and their Nationalist allies.

==== The 14th Air Service Group and the Chinese-American Composite Wing ====
The origins of the 14th Air Service Group go back to before the United States entered the war, when the American Volunteer Group (AVG) assisted the Chinese military in fending off the Japanese military under General Claire Chennault. After the United States joined the war, the AVG became the 14th Air Service Group and Chennuault helped establish the Chinese-American Composite Wing (CACW), which consisted of white Americans, Chinese Americans, and Chinese Nationalists. Oral histories of Chinese Americans in the CACW indicate that many servicemen felt a gap between themselves. Chinese people living in China, and white Americans, especially Chinese Americans born in the United States. Notably, Chinese soldiers from Hawaii had difficulty with both white Americans and mainland Chinese Americans.

==== The 987th Signal Company ====
The 987th Signal Company was activated in 1943 and consisted entirely of Chinese-speaking soldiers, including officers. Although not much has been written about the 987th Signal Company, a veteran of the company named Wayne Hung Wong published a recounting of his experiences and stated that the purpose of the unit was to act as a liaison between American and Chinese troops in the CBI theater.

== Female service ==
=== Female military service ===
Many Chinese American women also served in a military capacity during World War II. Among these women, Hazel Ying Lee and Maggie Gee served as Women Airforce Service Pilots. Lee trained in Portland, Oregon after being rejected from the Chinese Air Force on account of her gender. Gee dropped out of the University of California at Berkeley to work at a shipyard and later drove to Texas to enlist as a pilot. Both women served under military command and ferried aircraft to servicemen at docks or training centers. The WASP pilots were not officially designated by the U.S. government as veterans until 1977; they collectively received the Congressional Gold Medal in 2010. Gee was in attendance. Many women also served in non-segregated units in clerical roles, such as Ruth Chan, who served in the Women's Air Corps.

=== Female defense workers ===
In addition to serving in the military, many Chinese American women worked in defense industries during World War II. During this period, some estimate that the shipyards of the Bay Area in California consisted of 15% Chinese American workers. This included women such as Maggie Gee and her mother, Jade Snow Wong, and others. Like American women of other ethnicities, Chinese American women played a key role in keeping defense industries aloft during the war.

== Social effects of Chinese American service in World War II ==
=== Citizenship and the repeal of Chinese exclusion ===
In 1943, Congress repealed the Chinese exclusion acts on the recommendation of President Franklin Delano Roosevelt. Although there were several reasons for the repeal of the acts, including the allyship between the United States and China, the service of Chinese Americans in both military and defense industry contexts contributed to the repeal. Soong Mei-ling, the wife of Generalissimo Chiang Kai-shek, claimed that ending Chinese exclusion would boost Chinese American morale and thus improve war efforts. Due to the repeal of Chinese exclusion, many Chinese Americans (including veterans) were able to be naturalized after many years of living in the United States.

=== Family reunion and the War Brides Act ===
Upon their return from the CBI front, many Chinese American servicemen took "war brides" from their home country. The passage of the War Brides Act in 1945 enabled these men to bring their wives home to the United States, including servicemen who were already married to women in China before their period of service. This enabled many family unions after the Second World War ended, though some incoming "war brides" still faced issues with immigration. The Ping Yuen East Housing Projects in San Francisco gave priority to war veterans who sought to build their families and participate in the "baby boom" of the 1950s.

=== Social mobility and the GI Bill ===
Chinese American veterans were able to obtain an education due to the G.I. Bill, much like other veterans of different ethnic groups. Additionally, Chinese Americans of both sexes were able to increase their employment in professional fields, likely due to the rehabilitated image of Chinese Americans during the war and the increased employment of Chinese American women. Between 1940 and 1950, professional employment among Chinese Americans tripled for men and quadrupled for women.

== Recognition ==
Captain Francis Wai of the 34th Infantry was posthumously awarded the Distinguished Service Cross for actions on the island of Leyte in late 1944; this awarding was later elevated to a Medal of Honor in the 2000 review. Wilbur Carl Sze became the first Chinese-American officer commissioned in the Marine Corps.

== Congressional Gold Medal ==
On May 4, 2017, Senators Tammy Duckworth, Thad Cochran and Mazie Hirono introduced S.1050 Chinese-American World War II Veteran Congressional Gold Medal Act and Representatives Ed Royce and Ted Lieu introduced a companion bill H.R.2358. Efforts to pass the bill were led by the Chinese American WWII Veterans Recognition Project. The bill was passed in the Senate on September 12, 2018, and in the House on December 12, 2018. President Donald Trump signed the bill, enacting it into law on December 20, 2018. On November 6, 2021, Chinese-American World War II veterans were awarded the Congressional Gold Medal at the Crane Building in Philadelphia, Pennsylvania. Ken Wong, Civilian Aide to Secretary of the Army-Pennsylvania East, hosted the ceremony honoring veterans Harry Jung, Raymond Lee, and Paul Toy, as well as over 40 families receiving medals on their loved ones’ behalf.

On Dec 9, 2020, Army Capt. Francis B. Wai, who was awarded the Medal of Honor, the highest military award given by the United States, also was recognized as a Gold Medal recipient. He was killed while saving fellow soldiers during an attack in the Philippines.

One of those honored was Elsie Chin Yuen Seetoo, whose nursing studies in Hong Kong were interrupted when the U.S. entered the war after the attack on Pearl Harbor in December 1941.

== See also ==
- List of Japanese American Servicemen and Servicewomen in World War II
- Lost Battalion (World War II)
- Day of Remembrance (Japanese Americans)
- Military history of Asian Americans
