= Changchow dialect =

Changchow dialect may refer to:

- Zhangzhou dialect, a Hokkien dialect spoken in and around Zhangzhou, Fujian, China
- Changzhou dialect, a Wu dialect spoken in and around Changzhou, Jiangsu, China

== See also ==
- Changchow (disambiguation)
