= Wilbur C. Sze =

First Chinese-American officer of the United States Marine Corps

Wilbur Carl Sze
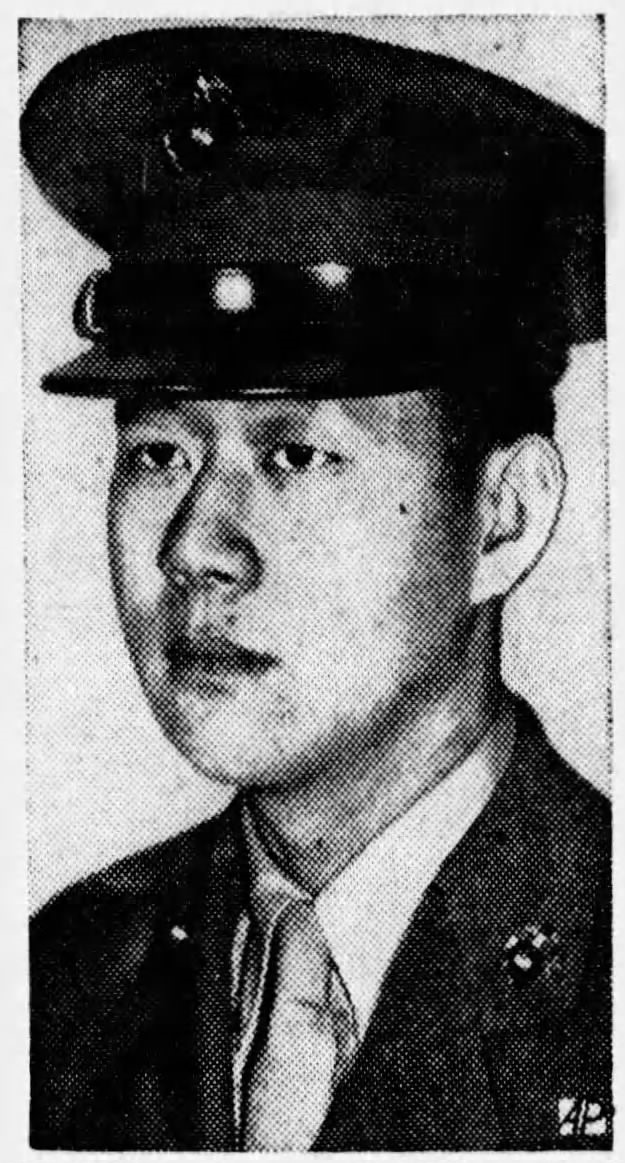
- Born: January 19, 1915; Washington, D.C.
- Died: December 15, 2009 (aged 94); Gaithersburg, Maryland
- Military career
- Allegiance: United States of America
- Branch: United States Marine Corps
- Service years: 1943–Unknown

Wilbur Carl Sze (January 19, 1915 – December 15, 2009) was the first Chinese-American to be commissioned as an officer in the United States Marine Corps.

== Early life and education ==
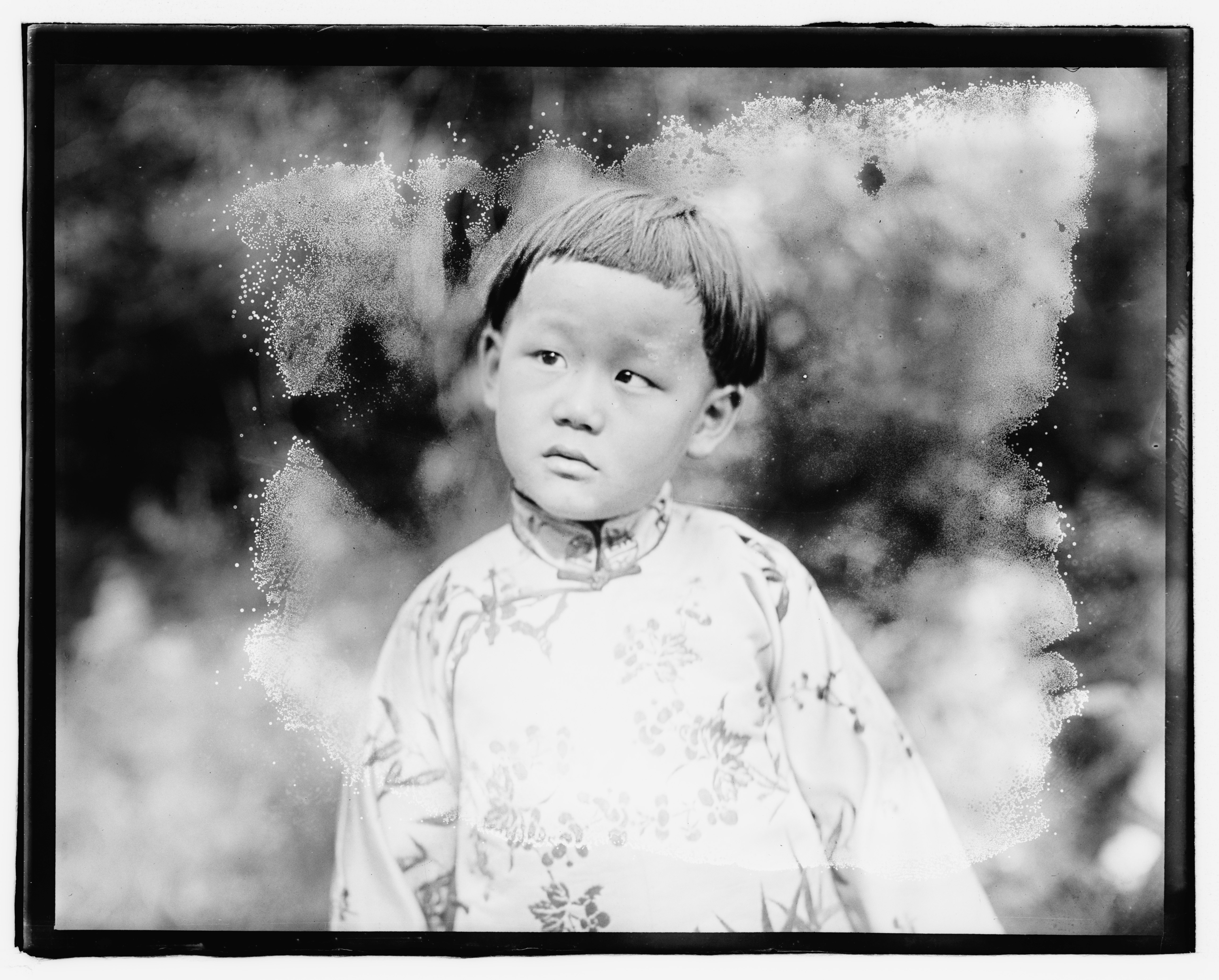
Wilbur Sze pictured in October 1919.

Wilbur Sze was born on January 15, 1915, in Washington, D.C. He was the son of Dr. Phillip Sze, a Chinese medical practitioner. His uncle was Alfred Sao-ke Sze, a prominent Chinese diplomat in the U.S. in the 1920s and 1930s. From 1920 to 1931 Wilbur lived in Shanghai, Republic of China. Upon returning to the United States, where he did not read, write, or speak English, he was enrolled in the Staunton Military Academy in Staunton, Virginia. In 1934, he transferred to Central High School in Washington, D.C., and later graduated in 1936. He next attended George Washington University where he studied electrical engineering. In 1937, the Empire of Japan invaded China which cut off the money he was receiving to attend school. Undeterred, he began working and attending classes at night. After eight years, he was able to attain his electrical engineering degree, graduating February 22, 1944.

== Marine Corps Service ==
On December 15, 1943, Second Lieutenant Wilbur Carl Sze became the first Chinese-American officer commissioned in the Marine Corps. In early August 1944, Lt Sze accompanied LtGen Robert Khe-Shang-Lim, Chief of the Supervising and Planning Committee of the Republic of China Army, on a tour of Marine Corps Base Camp LeJeune, North Carolina. From November 30, 1944, until January 29, 1945, Sze trained at and graduated from the Military Intelligence Training Center at Camp Ritchie, Maryland, placing him among the diverse ranks of the Ritchie Boys, a group of intelligence officers and enlisted men credited with obtaining much of the actionable intelligence on the Western Front.

Following the war, First Lieutenant Sze served as the aide-de-camp for Major General Keller E. Rockey, then Commanding General of the III Amphibious Corps while in Tientsin, China.

== Personal life ==
Sze was married to Mariana Yung-Kwa, the daughter of the former Chinese Consul in Washington D.C.

== See also ==
- Kurt Chew-Een Lee
- Military history of Asian Americans
- Chinese-American service in World War II
- Desegregation in the United States Marine Corps
