= Changchow =

Changchow is a former romanization of:

- Zhangzhou, a coastal city in southern Fujian, China
- Changzhou, a city on the Yangtze in southern Jiangsu, China

== See also ==
- Changchow dialect (disambiguation)
