= Francis B. Wai =

United States Army captain (1917–1944)

Francis Brown Wai
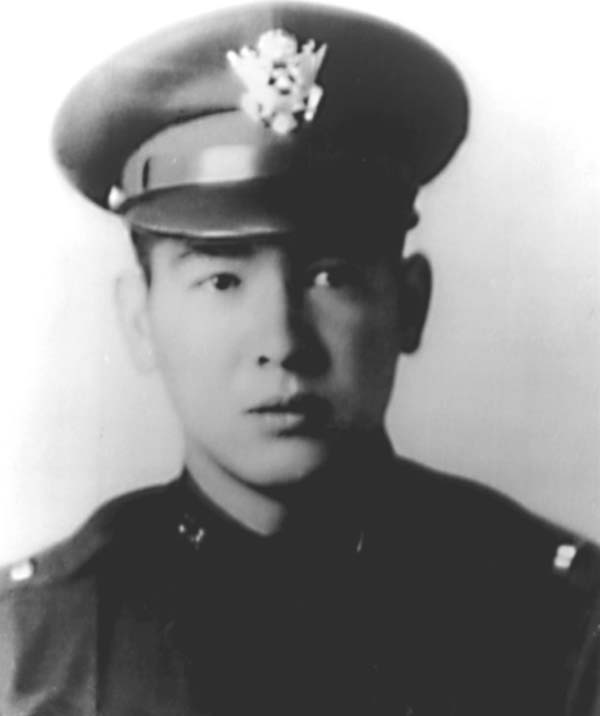
- Captain Francis B. Wai, U.S. Army
- Born: April 14, 1917; Honolulu, Territory of Hawaii
- Died: October 20, 1944 (aged 27); Leyte, Philippines
- Burial place: National Memorial Cemetery of the Pacific
- Military career
- Allegiance: United States
- Branch: United States Army
- Service years: 1940–1944
- Rank: Captain
- Units: 34th Infantry Regiment, 24th Infantry Division
- Conflicts: World War II: New Guinea; Battle of Leyte †
- Awards: Medal of Honor (Note: Wai was originally awarded the Distinguished Service Cross (DSC) posthumously in 1944. In 2000, his DSC was upgraded by the US Army to the Medal of Honor.); Purple Heart

Francis Brown Wai (April 14, 1917 – October 20, 1944) was a United States Army captain who was killed in action during the U.S. amphibious assault and liberation of the Philippine Islands from Japan in 1944, during World War II. He was awarded the Medal of Honor posthumously for extraordinary heroism in action at Leyte.

As a youngster, Wai liked to surf and he played several sports in high school and college. He graduated from college with a degree in finance. Although he initially planned to work with his father, he joined the Hawaii National Guard in 1940, and was commissioned as a second lieutenant in 1941.

Wai was initially awarded the Distinguished Service Cross (DSC), the United States' second highest decoration for valor in combat. After an extensive review of military awards in 2000, his DSC was upgraded to the Medal of Honor (MOH). Wai is the only Chinese American soldier to ever receive the Medal of Honor.

== Early life ==
Wai was the child of Kim Wai, a Chinese immigrant to Hawaii, and Rosina Lambert Wai, a Native Hawaiian. Growing up, he often surfed with Duke Kahanamoku, regarded as the father of surfing, and Buster Crabbe, who later became an actor. He graduated from the Punahou School, a prestigious college preparatory school in Honolulu, where in 1935 he earned athletic letters in track, football, and baseball. He then attended Sacramento Junior College for two years before transferring in 1937 to the University of California, Los Angeles. At UCLA, he was a four-sport athlete, including playing for the Bruins football team alongside his brothers Robert and Conkling Wai.

Francis Wai graduated from UCLA on January 31, 1940, with a bachelor's degree in Banking and Finance. He intended to work alongside his father in real estate and banking but instead joined the military upon America's entry into World War II.

== Military service and death ==
Wai at the beginning of World War II

Wai enlisted in the Hawaii National Guard in October 1940 and was called into active duty before the United States' entrance into World War II. After completing Officer Candidate School at Fort Benning, Georgia, he received a commission as a second lieutenant on September 27, 1941. His commission was rare at a time when few Asian Americans were allowed to serve in combat leadership roles. He was eventually assigned as an intelligence officer with Headquarters Company, 34th Infantry Regiment, 24th Infantry Division with the rank of captain. The 24th Division, based at Schofield Barracks, Oahu, was among the first American units to be involved in the Pacific Theater, exchanging fire with Japanese aircraft during the December 7, 1941 attack on Pearl Harbor.

=== Operation Reckless ===
In May 1943, Captain Wai deployed to Australia with the 24th Infantry Division and by September 19, 1943, the unit was at Camp Caves, near Rockhampton, on the eastern coast of Australia. Wai and the rest of the unit began intensive combat training. With training completed, the division moved to Goodenough Island on January 31, 1944, to prepare for Operation Reckless, the amphibious invasion of Hollandia, Netherlands New Guinea (now Jayapura, in the Papua province of Indonesia).

The 24th Division landed at Tanahmerah Bay on April 22, 1944 and seized the Hollandia Airdrome despite torrential rain and marshy terrain. Shortly after the Hollandia landing, the division's 34th Infantry Regiment moved to Biak to reinforce the 41st Infantry Division. Wai's regiment captured the Sorido and Borokoe airdromes before returning to the division on Hollandia in July. In two months, the 34th Infantry and Wai had crossed New Guinea and recaptured three airdromes from the Japanese.

=== Leyte ===
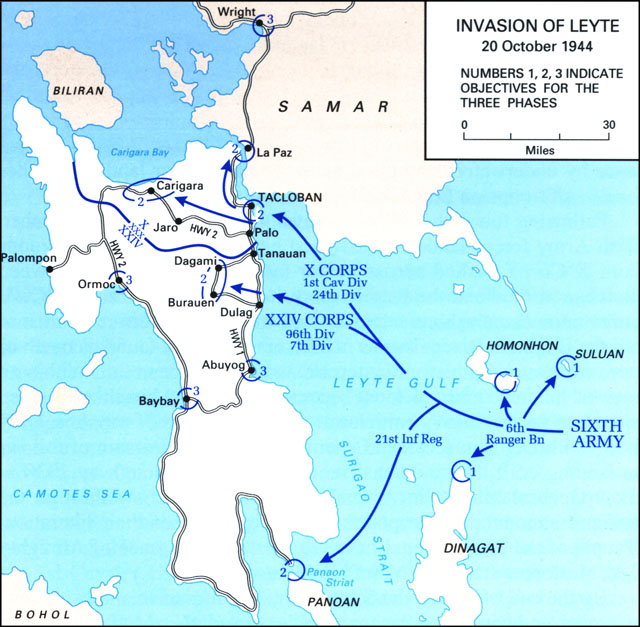
A tactical map for the Invasion of Leyte on October 20, 1944. The 24th Infantry Division landed in the northern part of the island with X Corps.

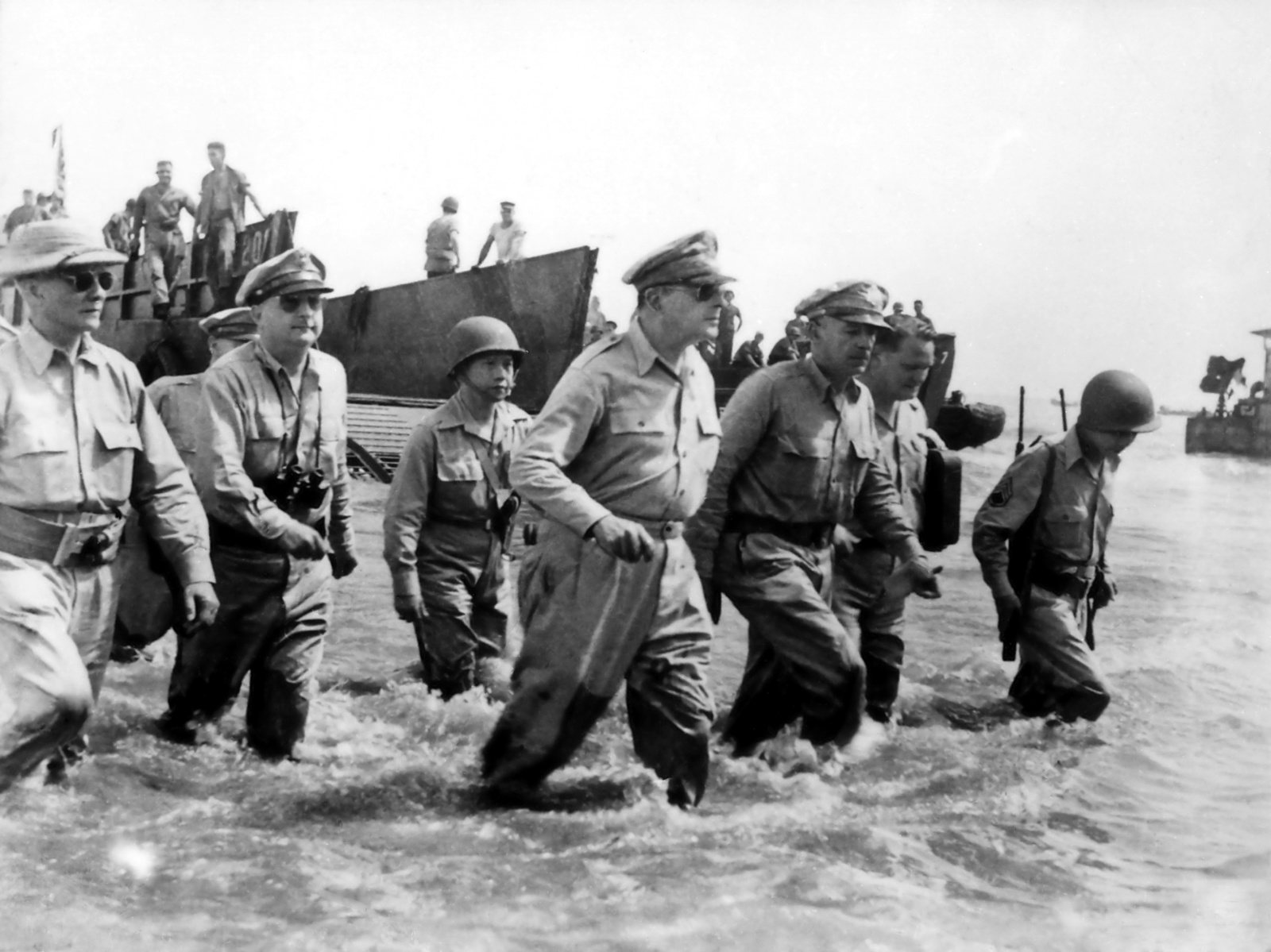
General Douglas MacArthur and staff, accompanied by Philippine president Sergio Osmeña (left), wade ashore in the 24th Infantry Division sector at Red Beach, Leyte, on 20 October 1944.

After occupying the Hollandia area, Wai's Division was assigned to X Corps of the Sixth United States Army in preparation for the invasion of the Philippines and embarked on October 13, 1944. The invasion began on October 17. On October 20, the 24th Infantry Division was paired with the 1st Cavalry Division within X Corps, and the two divisions made an assault landing at Leyte. The Leyte operation was to be the crucial battle of the war in the Pacific. On its outcome would depend the fate of the Philippines and the future course of the war against Japan.

When the 34th Infantry landed at Red Beach, the Japanese forces stationed on the island concentrated their fire on the waves of incoming troops from gun positions located in a palm grove bounded by submerged rice paddies. Wai arrived on the beach in the fifth wave and found one of the rifle company commanders in the 3rd Battalion, 34th Infantry had been killed and most members of the battalion were leaderless, disorganized, and pinned down on the open beach. Assuming command, and using a BAR (Browning Automatic Rifle), he moved through the rice paddies, without cover. His demeanor and example inspired the other men to follow him. With deliberate disregard for his own personal safety, he advanced without cover to draw Japanese machine gun and rifle fire, thus exposing the locations of the entrenched Japanese forces. Systematically, the Japanese positions were assaulted and overcome. Wai was killed leading an assault against the last Japanese pillbox in the area.

Wai's remains were permanently interred at the National Memorial Cemetery of the Pacific (better known as the "Punchbowl") and a military funeral was conducted for him on September 8, 1949 in Honolulu, Hawaii.

== Medal of Honor ==
In 1944, Colonel Aubrey Newman, the 34th Infantry commander, recommended Wai for a posthumous Medal of Honor for his actions on Leyte. Wai was posthumously awarded the Distinguished Service Cross; Newman was also awarded a DSC for his actions on October 20, 1944.

In 1996, amid allegations of prejudicial treatment of Asian Americans in uniform in World War II, Congress directed Louis Caldera, then Secretary of the Army, to conduct a full review of military records. The review concluded that 22 Asian Americans, including Wai, did not receive full consideration for the Medal of Honor. In 2000, Wai's Distinguished Service Cross was upgraded to the Medal of Honor by the US Army. On June 21, 2000, President Bill Clinton during a ceremony at the White House, presented the Medal of Honor to each of the 22 Asian Americans whose Distinguished Service Crosses were upgraded to the Medal of Honor. President Clinton presented Wai's MOH to his brother, Robert Wai Sr., during the ceremony.

Of those whose military decorations for valor were upgraded, Wai was one of only two who did not belong to the predominantly Japanese American 100th Infantry Battalion/442nd Regimental Combat Team; the other being Rudolph B. Davila of the 7th Infantry Regiment.

== Military awards ==
Captain Wai's military decorations and awards:

Combat Infantryman Badge
1st row	Medal of Honor		
2nd row	Purple Heart	American Defense Service Medal with 1 bronze star	American Campaign Medal
3rd row	Asiatic-Pacific Campaign Medal with arrowhead device and 2 bronze stars	World War II Victory Medal	Philippine Liberation Medal

Philippine Presidential Unit Citation

=== Medal of Honor citation ===
==== Details ====
Rank: Captain
Conflict/era: World War II
Unit/Command: Headquarters Company, 34th Infantry Regiment
Military Service Branch: U.S. Army
Medal of Honor Action Date: October 20, 1944
Medal of Honor Action Place: Red Beach, Leyte, Philippine Islands

==== Citation ====
For conspicuous gallantry and intrepidity at risk of his life above and beyond the call of duty. Captain Francis B. Wai distinguished himself by extraordinary heroism in action, on 20 October 1944, in Leyte, Philippine Islands. Captain Wai landed at Red Beach, Leyte, in the face of accurate, concentrated enemy fire from gun positions advantageously located in a palm grove bounded by submerged rice paddies. Finding the first four waves of American soldiers leaderless, disorganized, and pinned down on the open beach, he immediately assumed command. Issuing clear and concise orders, and disregarding heavy enemy machine gun and rifle fire, he began to move inland through the rice paddies without cover. The men, inspired by his cool demeanor and heroic example, rose from their positions and followed him. During the advance, Captain Wai repeatedly determined the locations of enemy strong points by deliberately exposing himself to draw their fire. In leading an assault upon the last remaining Japanese pillbox in the area, he was killed by its occupants. Captain Wai's courageous, aggressive leadership inspired the men, even after his death, to advance and destroy the enemy. His intrepid and determined efforts were largely responsible for the rapidity with which the initial beachhead was secured. Captain Wai's extraordinary heroism and devotion to duty are in keeping with the highest traditions of military service and reflect great credit on him, his unit, and the United States Army.

== Other honors ==
Wai was inducted into the UCLA Athletics Hall of Fame on October 11, 2014.

== See also ==
- List of Medal of Honor recipients
- List of Medal of Honor recipients for World War II
- List of Chinese Americans
- Chinese-American service in World War II
