= William Ah Hang =

Chinese veteran of the US Civil War

William Ah Hang (~1839 - December 3, 1923) was one of few veterans of Chinese heritage who served during the course of the American Civil War. He was also a businessman and prominent figure in the New York Chinese community. He served in the Union Navy during maritime conflicts in the states of South Carolina and Alabama. Notably, Hang was also heavily involved in legal advocacy for his citizenship status and voting rights after being denied the right to vote following a series of laws limiting the ability of Chinese immigrants to become naturalized U.S. citizens.

Hang was born in Canton, Guangdong, the southern trade capital of China. He emigrated to the United States in 1858, ultimately entering the country through New York City. Records indicate that Hang traveled by himself, and little is known about his parents or other family members. Hang eventually enlisted in the U.S. Military on July 24, 1863, at the Brooklyn Navy Yard, five years after having moved to the United States. Hang joined the Navy at the rank of Landsman, and he was promoted to Cabin Steward before he was honorably discharged from military service. His Navy record included service on at least three naval vessels: North Carolina, Albatross, and the Penguin.

William Ah Hang was granted status as a naturalized American citizen on October 6, 1892, by the County Court of Richmond, Ind. He lived in various parts of New York State and started a business as a cigar manufacturer. Upon the implementation of the Chinese Exclusion Act, Hang's citizenship was vacated by the New York Supreme Court. He attempted to recover his status and ability to vote multiple times in a series of legal pleas until his death in Staten Island.

== Early life ==
William Ah Hang (also known as John Ah Hang and surname also shown as Heng; his Chinese name was Tong Kee Hang) was born in Canton, China around the year 1839. His exact date of birth is unknown. Hang emigrated by ship, most likely a commercial vessel called The Dreadnaught, from Canton to the United States at the age of 17 years old. He entered the country at the port of New York and his entry was recorded under the name John Ah Heng. There are a lot of discrepancies in the historical record of Hang's legal name as Hang would sign under different names for different documents. Previously a cook, Hang became a steward on the Shakespeare, a ship that traveled between the UK and New York, at age 22.

== Civil War service ==
William Ah Hang enlisted in the Union Navy on July 24, 1863, at the Brooklyn Navy Yard at the age of 22 years old. Hang was one of the only known veterans of Chinese heritage who served in the American Civil War. Upon enlistment, Hang's personal description stated "black eyes, black hair, dark complexion, and standing at 5 feet 3 ½ inches tall". Hang was given the rank of Landsman upon enlistment, the lowest title in the Navy, often given to new recruits with little-to-no experience at sea. Landsmen would perform unskilled labor onboard naval vessels. Hang's first recorded deployment was aboard the North Carolina on August 13, 1863. He later served on the Albatross, another Union ship, on May 14, 1864. Hang also claimed to have served during Admiral Farragut's blockade squadron attacking Fort Morgan in Mobile Bay, Alabama. Hang ultimately transferred to the Penguin and made the rank of cabin Steward on July 31, 1864. Although Hang did not serve in an official combat capacity, he was quoted as saying that he assisted others in loading naval armaments in battle. Indeed, Hang once told a reporter that he would "not fight, but handed out powder, all the same". Hang was honorably discharged at the Boston Navy Yard on September 30, 1864. (Note: one source notes that he was honorably discharged from the Navy on July 5, 1865).

== Post-service life ==
William Ah Hang moved from Boston, Massachusetts, where he was discharged, to Staten Island, New York. There, he opened and managed a grocery store. On September 22, 1875, Hang made an appearance at the Court of Common Pleas to make his sworn declaration of intention to become a naturalized American citizen. His citizenship was granted by the County Court of Richmond, Ind. on October 6, 1892. In 1904, Hang became a cigar manufacturer in New York City with a store location at No. 500 Pearl Street. He resided at 13 Pell Street in the Manhattan neighborhood of New York City. He later became a trustee of the inaugural Chinese corporation in New York State: the Chinese Charitable and Benevolent Association. Hang married Jennie Busch in Savannah, Georgia in the 1870s and remarried to Maggie Duffy after Busch's death.

== Chinese Exclusion Act ==
The Chinese Exclusion Act was signed into law in the United States on May 6, 1882, by U.S. President Chester A. Arthur. The Opium Wars (mid-19th century) left China in debt and caused many lower-class Chinese workers to emigrate to the U.S., particularly to California. In the 1850s, over 20,000 Chinese immigrants entered the U.S. via San Francisco looking for work—racial violence and bullying quickly escalated and Chinese immigrants became viewed by many as stealing American jobs.

Although the Chinese composed only less than .01% percent of the U.S. population, Congress passed the Act to appease workers' demands and to maintain white "racial purity". The first federal law to significantly limit immigration from a particular country into the U.S., the mandate prohibited all Chinese laborers from immigrating to the US until 1892. This law was the first case of strong immigration restrictions in the country's history. This turning point in American history was facilitated by economic issues of the time being blamed on Chinese workers, especially by white American workers on the West Coast. The Act attempted to appeal to those workers who saw the influx of immigrants as a threat to the limited job market. The Chinese Exclusion Act was often applied unevenly and retroactively by judges who were prejudiced against Asians in the United States.

In 1904, The New York Times published a story entitled "Prosperous Chinese Arrested for Voting" which explained that in addition to laws passed in 1870 prohibiting further naturalization of Chinese people, the more stringent Chinese Exclusion Act was declared—by Assistant U.S. District Attorneys Marx and Houghton—to nullify previous naturalizations. Although Hang asserted that he had a right to naturalization, and that no objection had been made to his "Chinese birth" when he declared his intention to become a naturalized citizen, he was arrested and held on $500 bail.

== Court case and news coverage ==
After becoming a U.S. citizen following his emigration in 1857, Hang always voted in national elections. However, in 1904, Hang was arrested for attempting to vote alongside other Chinese-Americans, despite providing their naturalization papers to the arresting officer, Dempsey Meetze, a special employee of the Department of Justice. When Hang attempted to contest this, Joel Marx, assistant U.S. attorney, stated, "I consider the judges who issued the papers responsible for the dense and almost inexcusable ignorance shown by them in not knowing of the naturalization laws passed in 1870 and reiterated in 1882 in section 126 of the Revised Statutes, which explicitly states that Chinese cannot be naturalized".

Hang's citizenship was then vacated by the New York Supreme Court after having been arrested at a voting station for attempting to vote in an election with fraudulent documents. His naturalization was retroactively deemed illegal. Explicitly for purposes of leaving his military documents to his family at his death, but presumably also to build his citizenship case, Hang later tried to replace his lost military discharge papers in both 1910 and 1918. In 1910, Hang remarked: "I was living at West Brighton, Staten Island, when I was moving to New York and the confusion I believe I burnt [my discharge] with a lot of old memorandums that I wished to destroy" and in 1918: "just after leaving the supreme court of New York in City Hall Park of New York City I was jostled and shortly afterwards, upon looking for any papers which I had carried to the court with me, as I was a witness in a case, I discovered they were gone". Hang and other prominent members of the New York Chinese community were heavily involved in a legal case regarding their voting rights and citizenship status. Indeed, Hang petitioned President Taft for help regaining citizenship but was ultimately unsuccessful.

== Final years ==
Hang was admitted into the United States National Homes at Bath, New York for Disabled Volunteer Soldiers on August 14, 1919. Upon his admission to the Home, Hang's personal description was: "aged 80, gray eyes, gray hair, dark complexion, standing at 5 feet 4 inches tall, able to read and write, of the Catholic faith, a cigar maker by occupation, widower, a resident of New York City, and in receipt of a pension at the rate of $35". Hang died on December 3, 1923. He suffered a heart attack while visiting his wife's grave at Staten Island, and died two weeks later.
