= List of hazing deaths in the United States =

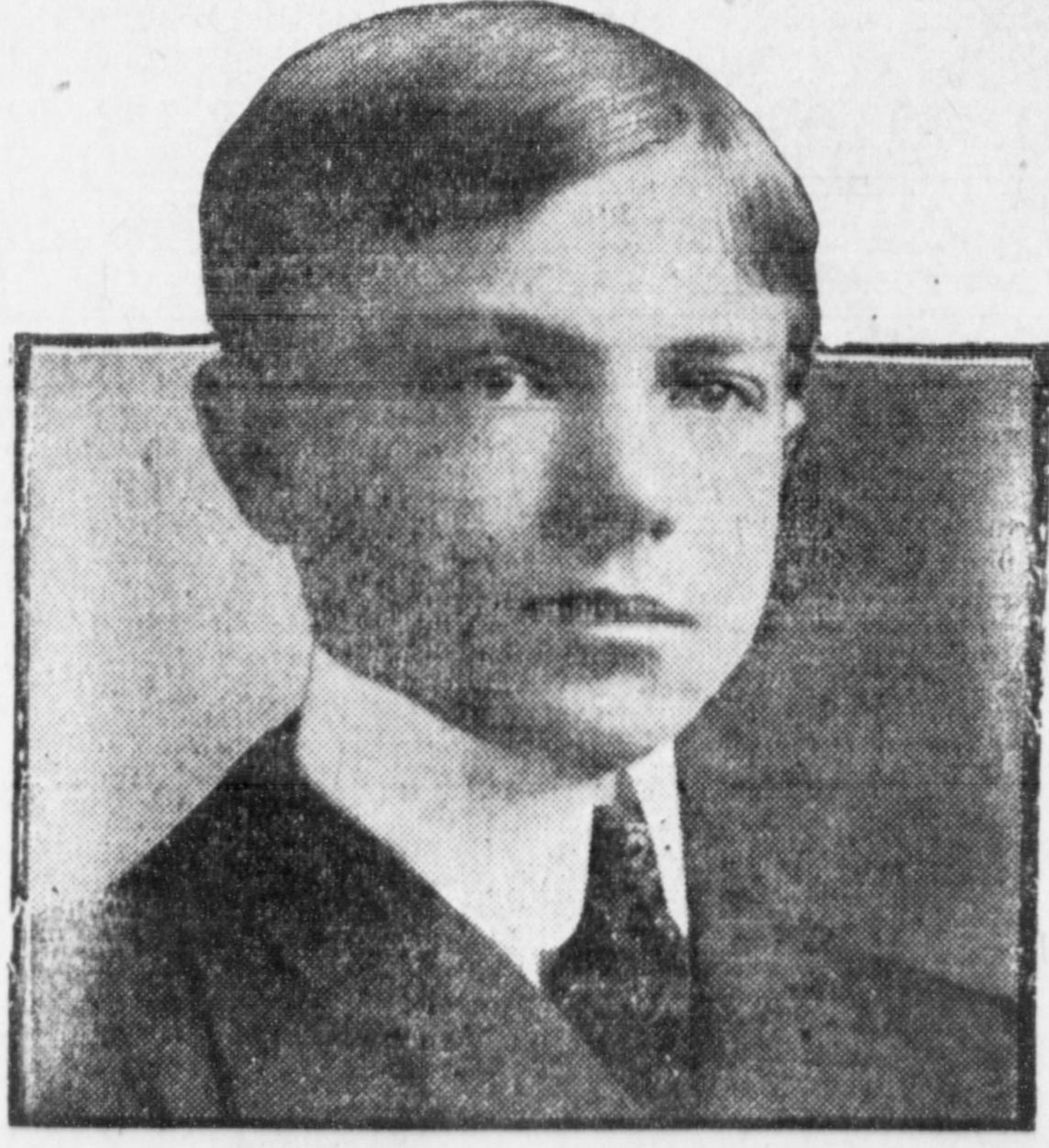
In 1905, as Stuart Pierson was being initiated into Delta Kappa Epsilon fraternity at Kenyon College in Gambier, Ohio, students sent him to a railroad bridge, which they believed was not in use; however, an unscheduled train arrived, killing Pierson.

This is a list of hazing deaths in the United States. This is not an exhaustive list. An exact list is not available because there is no central system for tracking hazing deaths, and the role of hazing in some deaths is subject to disagreement. Inclusion in this list requires that the incident be described as a hazing-related death by the media. Incidents involving criminal or civil proceedings that did not find a definite link with hazing may still be included if they meet this criterion.

According to the National Collaborative for Hazing Research and Prevention at the University of Maine, hazing is defined as "any activity expected of someone joining or participating in a group that humiliates, degrades, abuses or endangers them, regardless of a person's willingness to participate". Although hazing is often associated with the activities that take place as a prerequisite for joining a group, it can also include activities that take place as an established member, such as the 2011 death of fraternity brother George Desdunes.

There was at least one university hazing death in the United States each year from 1969 to 2021. Over 200 university hazing deaths have occurred since 1838, with 40 deaths between 2007 and 2017 alone. Alcohol poisoning is the biggest cause of death.

== List ==
=== 18th century ===
Date of death	Victim	Organization	Institution	Cause of death	Notes
1738	Daniel Rees		Masonic Temple in Philadelphia	Burns	During a mock initiation, flaming liquid was thrown on him by Masons led by Evan Jones. He died within days, and Jones was found guilty of manslaughter and branded. Benjamin Franklin, a member of the group, appeared as a witness for the prosecution.

=== 19th century ===
Date of death	Victim	Organization	Institution	Cause of death	Notes
1838	John Butler Groves	Class Hazing	Franklin Seminary (Kentucky)		According to family history records, Groves died in a hazing incident. No further details are available.
1847	Jonathan D. Torrance	Class Hazing	Amherst College		Torrance left school after developing a severe illness that he attributed to upperclassmen soaking his sheets. He eventually died from this illness, and Amherst president Edward Hitchcock attributed the death to hazing rituals, which were referred to as "freshman visitation".
October 17, 1873	Mortimer N. Leggett	Kappa Alpha Society	Cornell University	Injuries from a fall	Leggett was taken out into the woods at night as part of an initiation ceremony. He died after falling into a gorge while blindfolded. Two members who were guiding him also fell, but survived.
September 19, 1885	Edward Turnbach	Class hazing	Unknown public school in Hazleton, Pennsylvania	Kidney trauma	He was made to run through a gauntlet of schoolmates in which they punched him with their fists. He was punched in the kidneys severely and died several days later.
June 6, 1892	Wilkins Rustin	Delta Kappa Epsilon	Yale University	Peritonitis	A pledge was led blindfolded through the street during his fraternity initiation towards Moriarty's Cafe, a popular student hangout. He was told to run and did so at top speed. He ran into a sharp carriage pole, injuring himself. He was rendered unconscious, but the injury was not thought to be serious at the time. He suffered an intestine rupture and died five days later of peritonitis.
February 20, 1894	Henrietta Jackson	Class hazing	Cornell University	Gassing	The fatality was not a freshman, but a female cook who died when undergraduates misdirected chlorine gas into the kitchen as part of a hazing prank. The gas was intended to interrupt the Cornell freshman banquet.
September 29, 1898	David C. Jones	Class hazing	Decatur High School (Decatur, Illinois)	Spine trauma	Jones was participating in a hazing custom on September 6 in which all the freshman boys were put over the fence on the first day of school. There was a "lively" fight as well. Jones injured his spine severely and died at the end of the month.
October 27, 1899	Edward Fairchild Berkeley	Kappa Alpha Society	Cornell University	Drowning	Berkeley was attempting to pin a piece of paper to a tree or bridge (accounts vary) when he fell into a canal and drowned. Members insisted that the errand was not a form of hazing and was merely meant to keep him occupied until his formal initiation later that day.
November 22, 1899	Martin Bergen	Class hazing	Lawrenceville Academy (Lawrenceville, New Jersey)	Peritonitis	12-year-old Bergen died following a hazing tradition called "piling", in which the freshmen boys are forced to pile on top of one another, ending in the upperclassmen jumping on the boys' abdomens with their knees. Bergen ended the session without issue aside from some soreness for 2–3 days. He developed peritonitis from internal injuries and died several days later.

=== 1900s ===
Date of death	Victim	Organization	Institution or location	Cause of death	Notes
November 3, 1900	Thomas Finley Brown	Class hazing	Porter Military Academy (Charleston, South Carolina)	Internal injuries	12-year-old Brown was forced to drop blindfolded into a swimming pool. He dropped approximately 12 ft (3.7 m) into the pool, which contained almost no water. He died from internal injuries.
November 16, 1900	Hugh Chadwick Moore	Class hazing	Massachusetts Institute of Technology	Neck trauma	Moore died following the annual "Cane rush"—a tradition in which freshmen were given a special cane that the sophomores would attempt to steal during a scrap. After the pistol sounded to begin the rush, Moore grabbed hold of the cane, eventually finding himself at the bottom of the pile. He was asked several times if he was alright, to which he answered in the affirmative. When the event ended, Moore was unresponsive and could not be resuscitated. It was determined that he died of fractures to the upper vertebrae of the neck.
December 3, 1900	Oscar Booz	Class hazing	United States Military Academy; West Point, New York	Tuberculosis	Booz began at West Point in June 1898 in good physical health. Four months later, he resigned due to health problems. He died in December 1900 of tuberculosis. During his long struggle with the illness, he blamed the illness on hazing he received at West Point in 1898, claiming he had hot sauce poured down his throat on three occasions, as well as several other grueling hazing practices, such as brutal beatings and having hot wax poured on him in the night. His family claimed that scarring from the hot sauce made him more susceptible to the infection, causing his death. Among other things, Booz had claimed that his devotion to Christianity made him a target and that he was tormented for reading his Bible. The practice of hazing at West Point entered the national spotlight following his death. Congressional hearings investigated his death and the pattern of systemic hazing of freshmen, and serious efforts were made to reform the system and end hazing at West Point.
September 15, 1903	Ralph McBride	Secret society "L. of S.S.B"	Bluffton High School (Bluffton, Indiana)	Sepsis	Fifteen-year-old McBride died five months after he was hazed roughly during the initiation into a high school secret society. Three other boys were hazed roughly at the same time, leading another of the boys' fathers to press charges for assault and battery against the boys. The other boys survived, but McBride developed sepsis and died following a high fever and delirium. Attempts were made to save his life by removing the necrotic bone of his leg, but it was unsuccessful. Ten students were tried for assault and battery but were acquitted, citing the lack of proof that the death was related to the hazing instead of an unrelated illness.
November 8, 1903	Martin Loew	Phi Psi Chi (Local dental fraternity)	University of Maryland, Baltimore		Shortly after being initiated into Phi Psi Chi, German-born Loew was found deceased in his dorm room while his South African roommate was found unconscious. Upon awakening, Loew's roommate described the hazing. A week prior, Loew was undressed, blindfolded, and taken into a room where he was laid on a block of ice. He was then carried upstairs to a balcony and thrown over the railing, a drop of 24 feet. Underneath the railing were students holding a sheet. When he fell onto the sheet, he was tossed up and down until he was unconscious. After reviving, he was beaten severely. He was given whiskey and quinine that evening. The following Saturday, he submitted to an unknown form of hazing, and his roommate underwent the same hazing ritual that Loew had undergone the weekend prior.
1903	Ralph Canning	Childhood hazing	Barton, Vermont		Three young boys, aged 11, 10, and 7, read about hazing practices in college and decided to try it themselves. They built a fire in a pasture behind the schoolhouse and led nine-year-old Ralph Canning to the spot. They heated several stones until they were red hot. The boys forced Canning to both sit and stand on the hot stones and held him there despite his screams. The boys then either walked or jumped on him (depending on the source). He was finally allowed to leave, and he crawled home, where he died two weeks later.
September 1904	Frank Miller	Class hazing	Purdue University	Pneumonia	Miller and other freshmen were taken to a bridge over the Wabash River. When he refused to cheer for the sophomores, he was stripped, painted black from head to toe (black and gold are Purdue's official colors), and thrown into the river. He was forced to swim until he was exhausted in the very cold water. He died of pneumonia four days later.
April 1904	Freddie Fillwock	Class hazing	Rawson School (Findlay, Ohio)	Head trauma	Ten-year-old Fillwock was fatally injured during a hazing event by older boys at the school. He was being physically hazed by several boys who were several years older than him when he broke away from the crowd. He ran toward his home but fell, striking the back of his head on a stake. Several other boys piled on top of him. When he was picked up, his spine was injured, his skull fractured, and several ribs were broken. He died several days later.
October 28, 1905	Stuart Lathrop Pierson	Delta Kappa Epsilon	Kenyon College	Hit by a train	Pierson was killed while being initiated into a fraternity. He was sent to a railroad track as part of a hazing ceremony and killed by an unscheduled train.
February 10, 1906	William Taylor	Class hazing	A school in Lima, Ohio	Pneumonia	Thirteen-year-old Taylor was buried in a snowdrift after rough hazing by classmates. He died a few days later of pneumonia.
January 3, 1906	Cecil F. Leat	Class hazing	Hilliard High School (Columbus, Ohio)		On November 9, 1905, Leat was thrown into a rail, then to the ground, where he was beaten severely. He died the following January from the injuries.
September 27, 1908	Emil S. Gran	Class hazing	Worcester Polytechnic Institute	Spinal trauma	On September 22, 1908, Gran fractured his spine in the Sophomore-Freshmen cane rush and died several days later from his injuries.
March 1909	Charles Stinson	Class hazing	White School (Indianapolis, Indiana)		Stintson was strung up by the ankles to a tree near the school and left for an extended period. He died several hours after being taken down.

=== 1910s ===
Date of death	Victim	Organization	Institution	Cause of death	Notes
February 9, 1910	Clarence W. Gore	Class hazing	University of Oregon		Gore fell ill following a hazing session in November, during which he was told to keep up a bonfire for an extended period, resulting in several hours of hard labor. He never recovered from this illness and died in February.
September 12, 1912	William Rand	Class hazing	University of North Carolina at Chapel Hill	Neck laceration	Rand, along with other freshmen, was forced to leave his room after midnight by sophomores and carried onto the football field. The freshmen were forced to dance, sing, and do other hazing stunts on top of a barrel standing on end. At some point, he either fell or the barrel was kicked out from under him. He fell on top of a broken bottle on the ground, severing his jugular vein. The four sophomores ran away, while his roommate called for help. Rand bled to death seven minutes after the fall, before medical help could reach him.
July 24, 1913	Donald A. Kenny and Christopher Gustin	Fraternal order hazing	Loyal Order of Moose (Birmingham, Alabama)	Electrocution	Kenny and Gustin died by electrocution during an initiation ritual. The men were made to look upon a red-hot emblem of the Order, then blindfolded, disrobed, and had a chilled rubber version of the emblem applied to their chests, while a magneto was attached to their legs and an electric current was applied to them by a wire to their shoulders. The aim was evidently to make them believe that they were being branded. Both men fainted, but, as it was thought that they were feigning, the lodge officers did not stop the initiation until it was evident that the two were dying and the lodge physician was unable to revive them.
September 19, 1913	Francis Obenchain	Class hazing	Purdue University	Broken neck	Obenchain died from a broken neck following the "Tank Scrap" tradition, a brutal physical altercation between freshmen and sophomores.
May 26, 1914	William Bowlus	Class hazing	St. John's College	Gunshot	Bowlus was a cadet in the junior class at the time of his death. He, along with several other upperclassmen, attempted to enter a freshman's room to haze the occupants. Five freshmen were in the room at the time, and one fired a shot, striking him in the abdomen. The men refused to identify which one fired the shot, and a grand jury declined to indict.
November 25, 1915	Thurber Sweet	Class hazing	Virginia Military Institute	Spinal trauma	Sweet was the 17-year-old son of Chicago millionaire C.A. Sweet when he entered VMI. He left the institute in October, claiming he had been severely beaten by the other students with bayonets. Physician Dr. J.M. Scott attended to him, telling him his spinal injuries might result in paralysis. Sweet's health continued to deteriorate until he died at the hospital on November 25.
October 1916	Paul N. Blue	Class hazing	Morningside College	Head trauma	Blue died following a hazing incident in which the freshmen were given a severe blow to the head. His injury was complicated by diabetes. He became ill following the blow and died later at the hospital.
September 24, 1919	Frank McCullough	Class hazing	Colgate University	Drowning	Members of the sophomore class left freshmen, including McCullough, on an island to swim back to shore. He drowned.

=== 1920s ===
Date of death	Victim	Organization	Institution	Cause of death	Notes
September 21, 1921	Leighton Mount	Class hazing	Northwestern University		Mount disappeared on the evening of a class hazing event and was discovered deceased in April 1923 in a hole beneath a pier between heavy slabs of concrete. Several feet of knotted rope was found around the skeleton, and physicians who examined the body gave the opinion that lime was placed over the body before it was hidden, and reapplied several times after to prevent the body from being discovered. Police were suspicious of hazing as a cause of death because another student, Arthur Persinger, was found bound, gagged in the same way, and hanging off the pier with his head down toward the water as a form of hazing. Persinger survived. Before the discovery of Mount's remains, a class hazing between college sophomores and freshmen had resulted in the death of one student, Louis Aubere, in a car-ramming accident; at the inquest of Aubere's death, one student, Roscoe Conkling Fitch, made an admission that Mount had been accidentally killed, his body hidden, and those involved had taken an oath never to reveal the mystery. Students taken to the Criminal Courts claimed to have suffered a "loss of memory"; to have not seen Mount; a few admitted having taken an oath not to discuss the case at the instigation of student leaders because it would hurt the school. John Scott, son of Northwestern University President Walter Dill Scott, refused to talk with investigators because the "oath of his fraternity prevented him" from doing so. The only immediate result was to ban the type of hazing (class rushes) at the university.
January 6, 1925	Reginald Stringfellow	Class hazing	University of Utah		Stringfellow died following several instances of "tubbing", which was a hazing ritual that involved submerging the victim's head underwater for an extended period.
September 30, 1928	Nolte McElroy	Delta Kappa Epsilon	University of Texas at Austin	Electrocution	Sophomore football player Nolte McElroy was electrocuted during an initiation ritual in which he was forced to wear wet pajamas and crawl through two bedsprings that had been charged with electric current by connecting them to city lighting wires through a rheostat. 184 initiates had gone through the same ritual in the 15 years prior, without incident, including five before him on that evening. It is unknown why he alone was electrocuted.

=== 1930s ===
Date of death	Victim	Organization	Institution	Cause of death	Notes
September 13, 1931	Lloyd Aune	Class hazing	Stout Institute (Menomonie, Wisconsin)	Spinal injury	Aune, a freshman, was killed when his spinal cord was severed during a hazing incident in which he was wrestling with sophomores. Clifford Tweed, one of the sophomores involved in the grappling death, described the event as good-natured: "I had a toe-hold on him when he cried out. All of us picked him up immediately." He suffered a broken spine in the struggle and died a few days later.
April 11, 1935	Richard Beitzel	Phi Delta Theta	Dickinson College	Sepsis	Beitzel was walking through a field as part of a fraternity initiation stunt in February 1935. He fell against a tree stump, injuring his leg. He developed sepsis and died several weeks later.
February 25, 1936	Taylor Lewis	High school fraternity	Unnamed high school Miami, Florida		In November 1934, Taylor was struck on the hip and spine with a heavy plank during a hazing session. He died a little over a year later at the age of 17. He was confined to the hospital for most of the time between his injury and his death.

=== 1940s ===
Date of death	Victim	Organization	Institution	Cause of death	Notes
March 10, 1940	Hubert L. Spake, Jr.	Theta Nu Epsilon	University of Missouri	Suffocation	Spake died following a fraternity initiation ceremony in which he imbibed heavily. He was found face down in bed and was ruled to have suffocated on his pillow.
October 6, 1943	Wayne Rogers	Class hazing	Appleton High School (Appleton, Wisconsin)		15-year-old sophomore Rogers was assaulted on a church lawn during the evening of September 7, 1943 (the first day of school) by a group of seven others, including seniors from his school as well as a junior high school student and students from St. Norbert College. They clipped hair from his body and applied oil of wintergreen to his skin. His face began swelling, and he went into convulsions from which he did not recover. An investigation into the death was launched, concluding with an official ruling that the death was due to an unrelated case of nephritis. Rogers' parents were "extremely dissatisfied" with the conclusion, alleging that an autopsy was not performed on their son and the county coroner had not even been notified of the death.
February 19, 1945	Robert Perry	Phi Beta Pi	Saint Louis University	Immolation	Perry died a day after he was critically injured in a fire that occurred during his fraternity initiation ceremony. His nude body was coated with a flammable substance: a lampblack and collodion mixture. Electrical shocks were administered to his skin. An induction coil short-circuited, lighting him on fire.
February 20, 1945	Jack P. Jarosz	Military	United States Navy	Electrocution	Lt. Thomas H. Fike was found guilty of "conduct to the prejudice of good order and discipline" before a general court-martial following the death of Jarosz during a "shellback" ceremony, in which the sailor was told to touch the brass prongs of a trident when he gave a wrong answer. The intent was to cause a mild shock. Another sailor had undergone the same ceremony before Jarosz and suffered no ill effects. The ship's electrician testified that Fike told him to take all precautions in installing the device and that he witnessed Fike testing it out himself, finding the shock to be mild. Fike was acquitted of manslaughter and neglect charges.
January 26, 1946	LeRoy Robert Bragg and Stanford Fluitt	Military	SS Frederick Galbraith	Saltpeter overdose	Crew members Bragg, 14, and Fluitt, 16, died aboard the ship from an overdose of saltpeter during a traditional equator crossing initiation. Crew members who had never crossed the equator were referred to as "pollywogs" and were promoted to "shellback" status following the crossing. During the shellback ceremony, the boys were blindfolded and then marched out onto the deck, where they had numbers painted on them. They were then marched back into the mess hall to wait their turn for the next phase of the initiation, which involved drinking the saltpeter mixed with water. Bragg had obtained work on the ship illegally using fraudulent paperwork stating he was 17.
April 5, 1948	James Peterson	Senior honorary society	Montana State University	Gunshot	As part of the initiation ceremony for the society, Peterson and other pledges were instructed to break into the campus heating plant to sound a whistle. A night watchman fired a pistol to "bluff" the students, killing Peterson.

=== 1950s ===
Date of death	Victim	Organization	Institution	Cause of death	Notes
May 3, 1950	Dean Niswonger	Alpha Tau Omega	Wittenberg College	Hit by a vehicle	Niswonger and fellow pledge Jerry Wendell were taken out into the country as part of a hazing ritual in which they were to find their way back to campus. They decided to sit down on the road to wait for a ride, fell asleep, and Niswonger was hit by a truck.
Weekend of October 7–8, 1950	Gerald Foletta	Sigma Pi	University of California, Berkeley	Hit by a vehicle	Foletta was pledging Sigma Pi when he was driven out into the country to find his way back to campus. He was hit by a vehicle while walking back to the university.
March 1, 1951	Allen Kaplan	Class hazing	Northwestern State College		As part of a class hazing prank, Kaplan was told he was being set up on a blind date atop a bluff overlooking the Red River. There was no blind date, but another student jumped out from behind a bush, pretending to be the date's enraged husband holding a shotgun. He fired the gun into the air. The rest of the boys ran back to campus, but Kaplan never returned. It is unclear what happened next, but he was later found in the river below the bluff.
May 25, 1951	Fred Evens, Jr. and Thomas Kleppner	Lambda Chi Alpha	University of Miami	Hit by a vehicle	Pledges Evens and Kleppner were taken 30 miles away from campus and told to find their way back. They fell asleep on the roadway and were struck by a vehicle. Kleppner was killed instantly, while Evens died from his injuries several days later on May 30.
October 22, 1953	Calvin Dougherty	Class hazing	Milligan College		17-year-old Dougherty was injured in a race ordered by upperclassmen when he ran into a tennis cable. His pancreas ruptured, and his spleen had to be removed. He died several days later.
February 10, 1956	Thomas Clark	Delta Kappa Epsilon	Massachusetts Institute of Technology	Drowned	Clark was taken to a remote spot and told to find his way back to campus. He fell through the ice covering a reservoir and drowned.
October 7, 1957	Max Caulk	Delta Tau Delta	Santa Barbara College	Drowned	Caulk drowned during a fraternity ritual in which he was thrown from the pier into the ocean.
May 19, 1959	Henry Sherwood	Letterman's club	Yakima High School (Yakima, Washington)	Drowned	Sherwood died from drowning during a session in which he and other initiates were wearing burlap sacks and being paddled in the water. His disappearance went unnoticed for several minutes. His body was located, but revival efforts were unsuccessful.
September 17, 1959	Richard Swanson	Kappa Sigma	University of Southern California	Choking	Kappa Sigma pledges were told to swallow a quarter-pound piece of raw liver soaked in oil, without chewing. The meat lodged in Swanson's throat, and he began choking. The fraternity brothers did not tell police and ambulance workers about the hazing ritual, and instead attributed Swanson's respiratory distress to a "nervous spasm". He died two hours later. The incident inspired the 1977 film Fraternity Row, as well a CSI: Crime Scene Investigation episode titled "Pledging Mr. Johnson".

=== 1960s ===
Date of death	Victim	Organization	Institution	Cause of death	Notes
September 11, 1963	Michael Murphy	High school band	Charleston High School		Fifteen-year-old Murphy was killed in a band initiation incident in which three fellow band members were striking his stomach in an attempt to give him a "pink belly".
August 1966	Lamonte R. Jenkins	Football team	Roman Catholic High School (Philadelphia)	Drowning	17-year-old Jenkins drowned following a hazing incident in which he was thrown into the water by teammates.
October 9, 1967	John Clifton	Baylor Chamber of Commerce	Baylor University	Cardiac arrest	Clifton died following an initiation ritual in which he was told to drink a concoction of five different kinds of laxatives and garlic and then run in place. He regurgitated the concoction and then aspirated it, causing significant damage to his larynx and trachea. He began to have difficulty breathing while running and soon collapsed. He suffered a hemorrhage in his lungs and died of cardiac arrest.
February 8, 1969	Scott Graeler	Stag Club	Muskingum College	Heart failure	Graeler, a college football player, died of heart failure following an initiation ceremony. The details of the ceremony were not disclosed, but his death was ruled to have been caused by overexertion. The president of the club, John Falcon, was convicted and fined $100 on a charge of excessive hazing.

=== 1970s ===
Date of death	Victim	Organization	Institution	Cause of death	Notes
March 1970	Donna Bedinger	Alpha Gamma Delta	Eastern Illinois University	Head trauma	Bedinger and another female student were driven to a wooded area three miles away from Eastern Illinois University and left as the other sorority members drove away. The ritual was known as "pledge sneak". Bedinger ran after the vehicle and tried to catch its rear bumper, but missed, striking her head on the road. She died a few days later.
December 22, 1972	Fred Bronner	Chi Chi Chi	Los Angeles Pierce College		Three fraternity members dropped Bronner off on a secluded road with the intention that he would hike back to campus, approximately 10 miles. They told him to think about how "obnoxious" he was. He was found eight days later at the bottom of a 500-foot cliff in Angeles National Forest.
September 13, 1973	Mitchell Fishkin	Delta Phi	Lehigh University		Fishkin's fraternity brothers intended to drive the pledge to the other side of the mountain, then make him walk back to the fraternity. En route, he jumped from the moving vehicle and died.
November 12, 1974	William Flowers	Zeta Beta Tau	Monmouth College (New Jersey)	Buried alive	Flowers, along with other pledges, was digging a deep hole in the sand (said to be a symbolic grave), when the walls collapsed, and Flowers was buried, causing his death. His death spurred an anti-hazing statute in New York. Flowers would have been the first black member of ZBT at Monmouth had he survived.
April 5, 1975	Richard Gowins	WINE Psi Phi	Northern Illinois University	Alcohol intoxication	Gowins died after an initial ritual that required him to drink a half gallon of mixed wine, tequila, and gin in an hour. The organization was not recognized by the university.
September 12, 1975	Theodore Ben	Class hazing	Cheyney University of Pennsylvania	Head trauma	Freshman Theodore Ben was killed following a class hazing ritual. He slammed into a wall while carrying another student up and down a hallway, a hazing ritual known as a "dog line". His skull was fractured, and he fell into a coma. He died four days later at the hospital.
August 23, 1976	Samuel Mark Click	Pi Kappa Alpha	Texas Tech University	Hit by a train	Click was killed during a scavenger hunt as part of a hazing event. He was attempting to collect a letter that was under a railroad tie. He was hit by a train and killed.
December 5, 1976	Dennis Rodenbeck	Phi Gamma Delta	Iowa State University	Allergic reaction	Rodenbeck died from an allergic reaction after drinking massive quantities of liquor and beer. The chapter was investigated, but no charges were placed.
November 5, 1976	Thomas Fitzgerald	Pershing Rifles	St. John's University	Chest wound	Fitzgerald was a student at another university who had applied for admission into St. John's and the Pershing Rifles. He was kidnapped and intimidated with a bayonet when the blade accidentally pierced his chest, killing him.
April 21, 1977	Robert Brazile	Omega Psi Phi (not recognized by national fraternity)	University of Pennsylvania	Heart attack	Brazile died of a heart attack following weeks of intense hazing that included beatings, paddling, being forced to run long distances, and sleep deprivation.
February 5, 1978	Nathaniel Swinson	Omega Psi Phi (not recognized by national fraternity)	North Carolina Central University		Swinson died following a hazing ritual in which he was forced to run several miles and complete a grueling exercise routine. Swinson had sickle cell anemia, which was exacerbated by the strenuous workout.
February 24, 1978	Chuck Stenzel	Klan Alpine	Alfred University	Alcohol intoxication	Stenzel (some sources list his surname as Stevens) was awoken and taken with other pledges, stripped, placed in the trunk of a car, and told to drink a pint of Jack Daniel's, a six-pack of beer, and a bottle of wine between them. Three of the men were unconscious when they opened the trunk. He was left in his dorm for several hours until they finally brought him and two other unconscious pledges to the hospital. The other two men regained consciousness after 72 hours, but Stenzel died of severe pulmonary edema.
January 11, 1979	Bruce Wiseman	Theta Xi	Louisiana State University	Hit by a car	Wiseman and six other pledges were in the middle of an initiation ceremony in which they were guided blindfolded across River Road next to the Mississippi River. Their fraternity brothers, who were guiding them, attempted to get them off the road when a car approached, but they failed to do so in time, and the group was hit. Wiseman was killed, and three others suffered broken legs.
March 22, 1979	Norsha Lynn Delk and Robert Etheridge	Beta Phi Burgundy and WINE Psi Phi	Virginia State University	Drowning	Etheridge and Delk drowned while trying to swim in the Appomattox River, fully clothed, as part of a quasi-baptism initiation ritual that also involved alcohol.
March 30, 1979	Benjamin Folsom Grantham III	Alpha Tau Omega	University of Georgia	Auto accident	After being placed handcuffed and blindfolded in the cargo hold of a sport utility vehicle, the vehicle flipped over and hit a tree.

=== 1980s ===
Date of death	Victim	Organization	Institution	Cause of Death	Notes
August 31, 1980	Steve Call	Delta Kappa Phi	University of Lowell	Hyperthermia	Call was required to perform extensive calisthenics as part of his pledging.
January 25, 1980	Lurie "Barry" Ballou	Sigma Nu	University of South Carolina	Choking as a result of alcohol intoxication	Ballou choked to death on his vomit after he passed out from drinking massive quantities of alcohol in a drinking ritual as part of his pledging. His blood alcohol content (BAC) was 0.46 when he died.
April 2, 1980	Joseph Parella	Delta Kappa (local fraternity)	Ithaca College	Heatstroke	Parella died after undergoing a long-standing initiation tradition of calisthenics. One source described the events as taking place in a steam room. Another lists Delta Kappa fraternity's initiation rites as involving the 14 pledges doing 100 pushups, running up and down a steep hill, doing 100 more pushups, then sprinting up and down the hill again. Parella began having trouble breathing, so the fraternity brothers carried him into the hallway and removed his clothing to cool him off. He continued to decline, prompting them to administer CPR and to call an ambulance.
1981	Rick Cerra	FEX (local fraternity)	University of Wisconsin–Superior		Cerra collapsed and died after being forced to do calisthenics while wearing heavy clothing on a hot day.
March 30, 1982	Victor "Ricky" Miles Siegel	Alpha Omega Lambda	Towson State University	Traffic collision	Sleep deprivation stemming from hazing rituals was considered to be a contributing factor. At the time of his death, Siegel was wearing a Playboy Bunny costume and driving to get signatures of alumni as part of the pledging requirements.
October 6, 1982	Brian H. McKittrick and Christopher Meigs	Sigma Chi	University of Virginia	Pledging accident	
1983	Vann Watts	Omega Psi Phi	Tennessee State University	Alcohol intoxication	A member of his pledge class said that he had been beaten with switches as well, and his head had been shaved. Other members denied the allegation.
January 5, 1984	Arnaldo Mercado Pérez	Panthers Military Society (AFROTC Society)	University of Puerto Rico at Mayagüez		Mercado died after a few days of continuous pledging, military drill style, and physical abuse in the Air Force ROTC fraternity. He eventually died of renal failure and acute bilateral pulmonary bronchial disease.
February 28, 1984	Brad Bing	Kappa Alpha Order	University of California, Davis	Alcohol-related death	A truck carrying pledges and members crashed on Interstate 80 while traveling to paint a rock with graffiti; alcohol was a factor in the fatal accident.
1984	James Lenaghan	Zeta Chi	American International College		Lenaghan died after a ritual involving eating small plates of spaghetti, followed by large quantities of wine. Other fraternity members placed him in a bathtub after he lost control of his bowels, unaware that this was a sign of impending death. His BAC was 0.48 at the time of death.
August 30, 1984	Bruce Ward Goodrich	Corps of Cadets	Texas A&M University	Heatstroke	Goodrich died of heatstroke after performing strenuous calisthenics. Another student was found guilty of destroying evidence (a company exercise schedule), and three others pleaded guilty to hazing charges.
1984	Jeffrey Franklin Long	Tau Gamma Theta (local fraternity)	California State University, Chico	Hit by a car	On the night of Long's death, pledges were encouraged to consume two gallons of wine before participating in a drag race. Long was struck by a vehicle driven by another pledge.
1986	Mark Seeberger	Phi Kappa Psi	University of Texas at Austin	Alcohol intoxication (BAC 0.43)	Seeberger died of alcohol poisoning after he and two other Phi Kappa Psi pledges participated in a fraternity hazing ritual where they were handcuffed in a van and made to consume 16 to 20 ounces (~530 mL) of rum.
March 7, 1986	Michael J Dailey	Sigma Alpha Epsilon	Eastern Kentucky University	Alcohol intoxication (BAC 0.40)	Dailey was forced to drink 151 Rum until he passed out and was placed on a couch, where he was found hours later. His BAC was measured at 0.40. Fraternity members failed to seek medical attention, and the fraternity denied that any event took place that evening.
October 9, 1987	Harry (Skip) Cline Jr.	Kappa Alpha Order	University of Mississippi		Alcohol was a factor in the death. According to former student newspaper editor Frank Hurdle, Cline participated in a Big Brother–Little Brother event at the Kappa Alpha Order house where pledges were encouraged to drink. Cline passed out at the house, later awoke and fell down 17 steps, suffering fatal injuries.
February 13, 1988	James Callahan	Lambda Chi Alpha	Rutgers University		Pledges of Lambda Chi Alpha were encouraged to drink large amounts of alcohol in an attempt to make them sick. An autopsy confirmed that Callahan had a BAC of 0.434 when he died.
1989	Joel Harris	Alpha Phi Alpha	Morehouse College		Harris died following a hazing ritual in which pledges were required to recite historical events of the fraternity and were physically punished for errors. Harris eventually collapsed during a ritual involving slaps, blows, and punches. The ritual lasted between three and five hours. Harris was found to have an abnormal heart rhythm linked to congenital heart disease. As a result of his death, Alpha Phi Alpha voted to halt pledging within the fraternity, instead allowing members to join directly.

=== 1990s ===
Date of death	Victim	Organization	Institution	Cause of Death	Notes
October 19, 1990	Nick Haben	Lacrosse club	Western Illinois University	Alcohol intoxication	Haben died of alcohol poisoning. He participated in drinking games required for admission into the lacrosse club and was found dead in his dorm room the next morning. Haben's teammates said they had carried him there just before midnight and propped him up with pillows with his face toward the floor, so he wouldn't choke if he vomited. His BAC was 0.34 at the time of his death.
1991	Mike Nisbet	St. Pat's Board	University of Missouri, Rolla	Choking while intoxicated with alcohol	Nisbet was found dead after choking on his vomit after a ritual drinking game required of initiates into St. Pat's Board, an organization on campus that raised money for the annual St. Patrick's Day celebration.
March 31, 1992	Gregory R. Batipps	Alpha Phi Alpha	University of Virginia	Traffic collision	Batipps died in a car accident after falling asleep behind the wheel. His roommate told police that Batipps had been deprived of sleep during pledging activities, returned home at 3 am, and left a few hours later at 7:30.
1992	J.B. Joynt	Phi Sigma Kappa	Frostburg State University		Joynt died following a pledge sneak in which pledges were rough-housing with members.
1993	Chad Saucier	Phi Delta Theta	Auburn University	Alcohol intoxication	
September 28, 1993	Leslie Ware	Alpha Phi Omega	Alcorn State University	Shot to death	Ware was shot at 1 am while stealing a chair by the boyfriend of the chair's owner. The surviving pledges originally said they were retrieving the chair for a member who requested it, but subsequently changed their statement, claiming they were pulling a prank on their own. The chapter was banned by the national fraternity and was officially inactive at the time.
April 16, 1994	Terry Linn	Delta Chi	Bloomsburg University	Alcohol intoxication	Linn died of alcohol poisoning following Delta Chi's pledging "hell night". His BAC was 0.40.
February 14, 1994	Michael Davis	Kappa Alpha Psi	Southeast Missouri State University	Polytrauma	Davis died after being brutally beaten as part of a hazing ritual. He was unconscious when he was driven home and put to bed. He had broken ribs, a lacerated kidney, a lacerated liver, and bruises all over his chest, neck, back, and arms. He died from bleeding in his brain.
February 10, 1997	Binaya Oja	Theta Chi	Clarkson University	Alcohol intoxication	As part of Oja's initiation, pledges gathered in a semicircle around a bucket and were instructed to take turns drinking hard liquor. If any pledges did not drink the liquor fast enough, they were instructed to guzzle a full glass of beer. The point of the game was allegedly for pledges to drink to the point of vomiting. Oja was found dead the following morning. News reports suggested that he was pressured heavily to drink, but other pledges and various sources both within and connected to Theta Chi reported that Oja was drinking more than the others in an attempt to impress members of the fraternity, and that some fraternity brothers tried to convince him to stop drinking.
September 29, 1997	Scott Krueger	Phi Gamma Delta	Massachusetts Institute of Technology	Alcohol intoxication	Krueger died of alcohol intoxication as part of a ritual celebration intended to forge a bond between each freshman and an upper-class mentor. The freshmen at the party were required to collectively consume a certain amount of liquor. M.I.T. officials were reluctant to call it hazing.
November 11, 1998	Jack Ivey	Phi Kappa Sigma	University of Texas at Austin	Alcohol intoxication	Ivey's parents alleged that fraternity members tricked their son into drinking too much, stripped him down to his underwear, and tied him up before driving him around in the back of a truck on the night of his death in 1998. He died of alcohol intoxication, with a BAC of 0.46. Phi Kappa Sigma settled with his parents for $2 million.
December 11, 1999	Kevin Lawless	Sigma Tau Omega	Iona College	Alcohol intoxication	Lawless collapsed and died following the consumption of "large quantities of beer, wine, and vodka" at a bar and later at the apartment of one of the fraternity brothers.
March 15, 1999	Stephen Petz	Knights of College Leadership (local fraternity)	Ferris State University	Alcohol intoxication	Petz died of alcohol intoxication after drinking heavily as part of his initiation. On the night before his death, he played a game called the "wheel of torture". Petz's mother explained, "They sat in a circle, [and] would spin the wheel. And when it was your turn to spin, you had to drink what the wheel said." Petz consumed 27 shots of liquor and passed out. He was found in serious condition at 8 a.m. the next morning. His fraternity brothers drove him to the hospital an hour later.

=== 2000s ===
Date of death	Victim	Organization	Institution	Cause of Death	Notes
October 6, 2000	Adrian Heideman	Pi Kappa Phi	California State University, Chico	Choking as a result of alcohol intoxication	After consuming beer and blackberry brandy as part of his initiation ritual, Heideman became intoxicated and was moved to a back room while the rest of the chapter watched strippers who had been hired for the event. When his fraternity brothers checked on him at 1 am the next morning, they found him unresponsive; he had aspirated his vomit and asphyxiated as a result of severe alcohol intoxication.
January 29, 2001	Joseph T. Green	Omega Psi Phi	Tennessee State University	Asthma attack after intense exercise	Green had an asthma attack and died while jogging and doing calisthenics as part of his fraternity pledging. He had a temperature of 39.8 °C (103.7 °F) when he died.
November 4, 2001	Chad Meredith	Kappa Sigma	University of Miami	Drowning, while intoxicated with alcohol	After a night of drinking, Meredith was told to swim across Lake Osceola but struggled due to his intoxication. He drowned 34 feet from shore. Meredith's parents sued the fraternity and were awarded $12,600,000, the largest verdict ever awarded in a fraternity hazing death. In 2005, Florida passed the Chad Meredith Act, which allows prosecutors to seek felony charges for hazing.
February 12, 2002 (date found)	Benjamin Klein	Zeta Beta Tau	Alfred University	Apparent suicide after brutal hazing	Two Alfred University fraternity members, Bradley Calkins and Thomas Lam, pleaded guilty to assault and hazing charges, respectively, following the suicide of Klein. The men admitted to assaulting Klein on February 9 to prevent him from speaking out against the fraternity's hazing practices. "We were all afraid that if he left, he would get our fraternity in trouble because he was drinking and telling others about hazing practices in our fraternity," one of the men said. Calkins admitted he hit Klein in the head with a boot after binding his hands and feet with duct tape in a hotel room during a regional fraternity meeting. Lam admitted to encouraging the practice and not taking any steps to halt it. While he was still tied up, he was placed in the bathtub with the shower turned on and not released until he promised he would not leave the hotel room. Klein was found deceased three days later, of an apparent suicide by drug overdose in a creek behind the fraternity house. He was found with cuts and bruises on his body from the assault. A month after Klein's death, Alfred University voted to eliminate the Greek system from its campus.
February 14, 2002	Daniel Reardon	Phi Sigma Kappa	University of Maryland, College Park	Alcohol intoxication	Reardon died of alcohol poisoning following a hazing ritual. He was comatose for one week before life support was removed. The chapter is still active on UM's campus, but they have overhauled the way they bring members into the fraternity. The recruitment brochure for the 2012 year says it has "no pledging and no hazing. None. Never. Ever. Pledging and hazing have no place in a brotherhood."
September 9, 2002	Kristin High and Kenitha Saafir	Alpha Kappa Alpha	California State University, Los Angeles	Drowning	According to a lawsuit filed by their families, on the night High and Saafir died, they spent several hours at the beach doing calisthenics before being ordered to walk backward into the ocean. Saafir, who couldn't swim, was hit by a wave and knocked over. High attempted to rescue Saafir. Both girls drowned. A lawsuit filed by the girls' families alleged that they had been blindfolded, had their arms tied, and were wearing clothes and shoes when they entered the water.
October 10, 2002	Albert Santos	Pi Kappa Alpha	University of Nevada, Reno	Drowning	Santos drowned in Manzanita Lake as part of a fraternity ritual. It is unclear if the death was a result of hazing or a prank, but the fraternity was banned from UNR following the incident.
March 12, 2003	Walter Dean Jennings	Psi Epsilon Chi	State University of New York at Plattsburgh	Water intoxication	Jennings was pledging Psi Epsilon Chi when he was forced to drink numerous pitchers of water through a funnel. His brain swelled, and he died as a result of water intoxication. The fraternity had lost its recognition on campus five years prior.
October 20, 2003	Kelly Nester	Sigma Kappa Omega	Plymouth State University	Traffic collision	Nester was killed in a car accident in which she and 10 other pledges were blindfolded and packed into an SUV, which lost control and flipped. A lawyer for Nester's family said, "The understanding is that this was to be a punishment trip because some of the pledges hadn't done some of the things required of them. The intent was, apparently, either to scare them or drop them someplace, forcing them to find their way home." New Hampshire police said that the driver may have been driving erratically, rocking the Jeep back and forth, and jamming the brakes. The sorority was an unrecognized local sorority composed of members who had either left or been kicked out of Alpha Sigma Alpha.
November 25, 2003	Shawn Davis	Occupational hazing	Republic Energy Drilling Company	Polytrauma	A drilling rig employee received an 18-year prison sentence in the hazing death of 23-year-old Shawn Davis, a new employee of Republic Energy Drilling Company. Veteran employees were attempting to hoist Davis upwards via a cable used to pick up a pipe and place it on the rig floor. Davis resisted, but the employees succeeded in putting the belt on Davis and hooking him to the cat line. Another employee noted that the kelly, the device located on the rig floor that is used to drill into the ground and spins at seventy rotations per minute, was turning, and, based on his experience, he knew that any slack in the cat line could get caught on the kelly as it turned. Unbeknownst to other employees, this is what happened shortly before he was hooked to the cat line. They hastily attempted to unhook the cat line as it pulled Davis out of the door of the top doghouse. Davis was dragged, face-first, out of the building. Davis hit the bottom half of the doghouse door, taking it off the hinges. He was then dragged to the Kelly bushing, where he was spun around approximately ten to twenty times as his body hit several different pieces of equipment and surfaces. They immediately shut down the equipment and called 911, but he died of blunt force trauma.
March 8, 2004	William James	Southside Masonic Lodge, Patchogue, New York	Freemasons	Shot to death	James was killed during an initiation ceremony into an unsanctioned "Fellowcrafts Club" attached to a local lodge when another member mistakenly fired a gun loaded with real bullets instead of blanks. Police say that the members—all Masons—sat James in a chair and placed cans on a small platform around his head. The alleged shooter, Albert Eid, was standing approximately 20 feet away, holding a gun. A second man was supposed to knock the cans off when the gun was fired to make the inductee think they had been struck by bullets to create fear and anxiety. Eid had two guns—one with blanks and one with real bullets—and pulled the wrong one out of his pocket and fired, hitting James.
September 17, 2004	Gordie Bailey	Chi Psi	University of Colorado at Boulder	Alcohol intoxication	Bailey died of alcohol intoxication following a fraternity initiation ritual that involved heavy drinking. The Gordie Foundation was set up in his memory, "to provide today's young people with the skills to navigate the dangers of alcohol, binge drinking, peer pressure and hazing".
November 18, 2004	Steven David Judd	Delta Chi	New Mexico State University	Alcohol intoxication	As part of Delta Chi fraternity's 21st birthday hazing ritual, Steven consumed at least 15 shots of hard liquor in 2 hours at a local bar. Police reports state that Steven had on at least two separate occasions asked the bartenders not to serve him any more alcohol, and was also served a drink to cause him to vomit, which was unsuccessful. After returning to his fraternity house, he fell several times, hitting his head, and was put to bed, where he was found unconscious the following morning. He was ultimately taken off life support just 24 hours after turning 21. At the time of his death, Steven was a junior Crimson Scholar at New Mexico State University, majoring in computer science. The university refused to accept any responsibility or make significant changes in its campus policies. Repeated attempts to get the New Mexico legislature to pass a "Cinderella Law", which would have postponed the time by which an individual turning 21 could drink by 12 hours, were consistently met with opposition from the liquor lobby and failed every time in committee. A memorial scholarship, funded by his parents and friends, has been awarded each year for the student who "has made the greatest contribution toward alcohol prevention and the reduction of high-risk drinking at NMSU."
February 2, 2005	Matthew Carrington	Chi Tau (local)	California State University, Chico	Water intoxication	Carrington was forced to drink large amounts of water and do calisthenics in a basement flooded with raw sewage, with fans blowing on him. He died from water intoxication. The ritual dated back 20 years at the fraternity. As a result, California passed Matt's Law, which allows for felony prosecution of some hazing rituals, which had historically been misdemeanors.
August 28, 2005	Kenny Luong	Lambda Phi Epsilon	University of California, Irvine	Intense exercise	Luong died after being tackled in a ritual football game that pitted the 10-member pledge group against approximately 40 active members and alumni. The game lasted for more than 3 hours and was played without the use of pads. Before the football game, the pledges were forced to complete vigorous calisthenics such as close-fisted pushups on gravel; jumping in the air while standing, landing on their chests without using their hands to break their fall; and drinking two gallons of water in one sitting.
December 10, 2005	Phanta "Jack" Phoummarath	Lambda Phi Epsilon	University of Texas at Austin	Alcohol intoxication	Phoummarath was given at least four bottles of liquor to drink on the evening of his death. His BAC was measured at 0.41. Fraternity members failed to seek medical attention for at least 12 hours after he fell unconscious.
January 8, 2006	Danny Ray Daniels	Phi Gamma Delta	California State University, Fresno	Alcohol intoxication	It was found out that Daniels and his fraternity hosted a large party with up to seventy people on January 7. They discovered Daniels was a pledge, and fraternity brothers forced him to drink large amounts of alcohol for initiation. Once he became sick, fraternity members carried him to a secluded room at the fraternity and left him. Daniels died in the early morning of January 8, 2006, from acute alcohol intoxication, and later tests showed that Daniels had a blood-alcohol level of 0.34, more than four times the legal limit. The university suspended the chapter for five years, and as of 2019, it remains inactive.
November 17, 2006	Tyler Cross	Sigma Alpha Epsilon	University of Texas at Austin	Polytrauma due to falling after alcohol intoxication	Investigators say Cross fell from a fifth-floor balcony as a result of being highly intoxicated after a hazing ritual. Cross' family claims that he was beaten with paddles, forced to consume large amounts of alcohol, and deprived of sleep.
March 30, 2007	Gary DeVercelly	Phi Kappa Tau	Rider University	Alcohol intoxication	DeVercelly died from alcohol poisoning as a result of a fraternity hazing ritual. During "Big Little Night" at Phi Kappa Tau, pledges were presented with their 'family' drink and were required to drink the entire bottle before leaving the basement of the fraternity house. All 16 pledges drank, and many finished their bottles. Two went to the hospital with alcohol poisoning; DeVercelly died.
October 5, 2008	Johnny D. Smith	Delta Tau Delta	Wabash College	Alcohol intoxication	Smith died of alcohol poisoning while pledging Delta Tau Delta at Wabash. Following the death, Wabash shut down and discontinued its lease of the fraternity house. Smith's BAC was 0.40 at his death.
November 8, 2008	Brett Griffin	Sigma Alpha Mu	University of Delaware	Alcohol intoxication	Griffin died of alcohol poisoning after participating in a fraternity ritual, in which the pledges lined up in the basement of the fraternity house, ate raw onion slathered with hot sauce, and drank concoctions that made them vomit. Griffin then drank a 750 ml bottle of Southern Comfort. He was propped up on his side on a couch with a bucket or trash can in which to vomit, and later found "foaming out of his mouth." He died with a BAC of 0.341.
November 18, 2008	Harrison Kowiak	Theta Chi	Lenoir–Rhyne University	Head injury	Kowiak was fatally injured while playing a capture-the-flag-like game as part of an initiation. According to a lawsuit filed by Kowiak's family, Kowiak and another pledge were dressed in brightly colored clothing and led out onto a dark field with instructions to make it to the other end while fraternity brothers tried to stop them. Kowiak struck his head on the ground after being tackled.
November 20, 2008	Michael Starks	Sigma Nu	Utah State University	Alcohol intoxication	Starks died of alcohol poisoning after drinking heavily as part of the initiation ritual.
December 2, 2008	Carson Starkey	Sigma Alpha Epsilon	California Polytechnic State University, San Luis Obispo	Alcohol intoxication	Starkey died of alcohol poisoning with a BAC between 0.39 and 0.44. He had attended a "brown bag" event, where fraternity members ordered pledges to drink specified amounts of alcohol from unknown bottles wrapped in paper bags.
March 1, 2009	Arman Partamian	Pigs (unofficial local fraternity)	State University of New York at Geneseo	Alcohol intoxication	Partamian died of alcohol poisoning with a BAC of 0.55. The Pigs had been penalized for hazing practices in 1996 when two students were hospitalized for alcohol poisoning. (Group also known as Orange Knights)
October 21, 2009	Donnie Wade	Phi Beta Sigma	Prairie View A&M University	Acute exertional rhabdomyolysis	Wade collapsed during exercise drills and died because of "acute exertional rhabdomyolysis," a syndrome linked to sudden deaths of military recruits and athletes. A lawsuit by Wade's family alleges that Wade was deprived of fluids while undergoing the intense exercise session that included running bleachers, holding his legs six inches off the ground, doing pushups and jumping jacks, and living on a strict bread-and-water diet.

=== 2010s ===
Date of death	Victim	Organization	Institution	Cause of Death	Notes
October 15, 2010	Samuel Mason	Tau Kappa Epsilon	Radford University	Alcohol intoxication	According to his mother, Mason died of alcohol poisoning after taking part in the fraternity's "family drink" ritual, where pledges are given a large amount of alcohol and told to finish an allotted portion. In this case, she claims the alcohol was in a 5-gallon gas can. His BAC was 0.48 at the time of his death.
2010	Victoria Carter and Briana Latrice Gather	Delta Sigma Theta	East Carolina University	Traffic collision after sleep deprivation and fatigue	Carter and Gather died in a traffic accident around 6:30 am on the way to a hair appointment to prepare for initiation. Gather and Carter had undergone several grueling hazing activities that week, including the "Delta TV," in which the pledges were forced to get into and hold a push-up position, do "wall sits" and maintain that stance for a long period, and do the "Delta Chair": standing on one leg and holding heavy bricks over their heads. The pledges also wore "Delta Lipstick": hot sauce rubbed on their lips, and ate a "Delta Apple," a large raw onion; they were also asked to eat large amounts of cottage cheese, and drink buttermilk. The driver of the vehicle, a fellow pledge who survived, pleaded guilty to a misdemeanor death by motor vehicle. According to the lawsuit filed by the family, she was suffering from "excessive and overwhelming fatigue, exhaustion, and sleep deprivation, and fell asleep behind the wheel" because of the pledging exercises. The night and morning hours before the accident, the pledges had been practicing the "probate death march," an aspect of the initiation ceremony. They did not have the opportunity to sleep as a result of the long hours of practice.
February 25, 2011	George Desdunes	Sigma Alpha Epsilon	Cornell University	Alcohol intoxication	Desdunes died of alcohol poisoning following a Sigma Alpha Epsilon ritual that is the reverse of traditional hazing rituals. Freshman pledges kidnap older members, blindfold them, and bind their wrists and ankles with zip ties and duct tape. The fraternity brothers are asked trivia questions about Sigma Alpha Epsilon and drink if they get an answer wrong.
November 2, 2012	David Bogenberger	Pi Kappa Alpha	Northern Illinois University	Alcohol intoxication	Bogenberger died of a cardiac arrhythmia triggered by alcohol poisoning. "The event that night involved the pledges rotating between several rooms in the fraternity house, being asked a series of questions, and then being provided cups of vodka and other liquor to drink," police said in a statement. "This resulted in the pledges drinking a large quantity of alcohol in about two hours." Pledges were told to drink regardless of whether they answered questions correctly. In 2015, 22 former Pi Kappa Alpha fraternity members were convicted of various charges related to the death. None of the men were sentenced to jail time, mostly receiving fines and community service. Richard Schmack, DeKalb County State's Attorney, said it was the largest hazing prosecution in U.S. history.
November 19, 2011	Robert Champion	Florida A&M Marching Band	Florida A&M University	Collapse, blunt force trauma	Champion was a drum major in the university's marching band, the Marching 100. He collapsed after undergoing a ritual referred to as "Crossing Bus C", in which band members must walk from the front of the bus to the back while other band members kick, punch, and hit him with straps, drum sticks, and other objects. Fellow band members told detectives that the ritual is required to be considered for leadership positions. The university president, James Ammons, resigned shortly after, as did two faculty members. The band was suspended for over a year. The leader, Dante Martin, was convicted of manslaughter and hazing charges and sentenced to six years in prison.
February 17, 2012	William Torrance	Delta Gamma Iota	Vincennes University	Alcohol intoxication	Torrance died of alcohol poisoning after a bid night ceremony.
September 3, 2012	Philip Dhanens	Theta Chi	California State University, Fresno	Alcohol intoxication	Dhanens died of alcohol poisoning (BAC 0.36) after a hazing event in which 15 pledges were placed in a room where they were told they had to drink eight bottles of hard liquor to leave. His blood alcohol level was 0.36. The fraternity president pleaded no contest to a single misdemeanor charge of hazing and was sentenced to three years' probation and community service; two other fraternity members pleaded no contest to a misdemeanor charge of hazing and providing alcohol to a minor, causing death, and were sentenced to 90 days and 30 days in jail, respectively.
March 26, 2012	Robert Tipton	Delta Sigma Phi	High Point University	Oxymorphone overdose after brutal hazing	22-year-old Robert Eugene Tipton Jr. was pledging Delta Sigma Phi when he was found unresponsive in an off-campus apartment on March 26, 2012. He was pronounced dead at the hospital later that day. The state medical examiner ruled that an oxymorphone overdose was the cause of death, and no criminal charges were filed. The family filed a lawsuit against the fraternity, the university, and members of the fraternity, alleging that Tipton was "violently" assaulted and battered during a fraternity "counseling session," and suffered blunt force trauma to the head, which led to his death. The suit also alleges that a fraternity member deleted text messages from Tipton's phone after his death to cover up the hazing. The suit contends the school was aware of "outrageous conduct" by the fraternity and misrepresented "information about the frequency or incidence of hazing, violence, injuries, substance abuse, and/or other dangerous and/or illegal activities at HPU or within Delta Sigma Phi."
April 20, 2013	Marvell Edmondson and Jauwan Holmes	Men of Honor (local, unsanctioned fraternity)	Virginia State University	Drowning	Edmondson and Holmes drowned during an initiation rite for the underground fraternity known as Men of Honor. Seven students locked arms and attempted to cross the Appomattox River together. Fraternity members told police they completed the same rite several months earlier without issue, and the water was shallow enough to make it across without swimming. On April 20, however, the river had swelled considerably due to a recent storm and was moving more swiftly. The students quickly became submerged and were swept downstream. The other five men were rescued by members of the fraternity. Four fraternity members pleaded guilty to involuntary manslaughter and hazing charges.
April 24, 2013	Peter Tran	Lambda Phi Epsilon	San Francisco State University	Alcohol poisoning	During a "crossover" party where new members were initiated into the fraternity, Tran died of alcohol poisoning. He wasn't discovered until the next day. A member of the fraternity attempted to perform CPR, but Tran was pronounced dead at 1 PM on April 24. Lambda Phi Epsilon was expelled from the university following Tran's death.
December 8, 2013	Chun "Michael" Deng	Pi Delta Psi	Baruch College	Head injury	Deng died following a hazing ritual called "glass ceiling" while on a retreat in the Poconos. He was blindfolded and wearing a backpack filled with 20 pounds of sand. He fell over after being pushed, striking his head. After he lost consciousness, fraternity members delayed seeking medical assistance for two hours. He died two days later.
July 1, 2014	Armando Villa	Pi Kappa Phi	California State University, Northridge	Heat stroke while hiking	Villa died following an 18-mile group hike with other pledges near Big Tujunga Canyon Road in Angeles National Forest. According to an attorney who represented Villa's parents, the group ran out of water at some point during the hike, and Villa left the group in search of more water. He was later found unresponsive, lying face down in a culvert. Other pledges told authorities that they didn't realize Villa "was any worse off than the other hikers," according to court documents. He died from heatstroke. His family sued CSUN and the fraternity. Prosecutors declined to charge the fraternity president, stating that a group hike on a hot day with an inadequate water supply did not fit the traditional definition of hazing. They argued that hazing deaths are usually the result of excessive alcohol consumption, drugs, or physical injury inflicted by fraternity members, and Villa's death was not due to those causes.
September 22, 2014	Tucker Hipps	Sigma Phi Epsilon	Clemson University	Head injuries after a fall	Sigma Phi Epsilon pledge Tucker Hipps was participating in a group run with his fraternity around 5:30 am when he fell from a bridge into the shallow waters of Lake Hartwell. He died of head injuries from the fall. The fraternity members reported that he got separated from the group and didn't return from the run. He was reported missing, and his body was found later that day. The police investigating his death released a statement that they were unable to find any link between hazing and his death, but it was widely speculated, particularly on social media, that the death resulted from hazing. Because of the widespread rumors, the president's Interfraternity Council at Clemson voted to suspend pledge activities. Hipps' family filed a lawsuit against Clemson University, Sigma Phi Epsilon, and three fraternity brothers. Citing an unnamed witness, they allege that Hipps was forced to walk the narrow railing of the S.C. 93 bridge before the fall.
November 14, 2014	Nolan Burch	Kappa Sigma	West Virginia University	Alcohol intoxication	Burch, 18, died of alcohol poisoning following an initiation function referred to as "Big-Little" on November 12, 2014. Burch was taken back to the fraternity house following the function because of his "high level of intoxication." Shortly before midnight, another member of Kappa Sigma noticed that Burch's face had a blue coloration to it and was unable to wake him. The fraternity brothers started CPR and called 911, but he died two days later. His blood alcohol content (BAC) was measured at .493 percent. The fraternity brother who provided Burch with the bottle of alcohol was charged with one count of hazing and one count of conspiracy to commit hazing.
November 17, 2014	Trevor Duffy	Zeta Beta Tau	University at Albany	Alcohol intoxication	Duffy, 19, died of alcohol poisoning two days after a pledging ritual in which he was to consume a 60-ounce (1.8 litre) bottle of Belvedere Vodka. He had a blood alcohol level of 0.58. The ZBT chapter lost its recognition in the fall of 1997, but continued to operate underground. In 2011, the national fraternity Zeta Beta Tau formed a new chapter at Albany, with the underground fraternity continuing to use the same name. The recognized ZBT chapter on the University of Albany's campus was not involved in the incident.
March 18, 2016	Raheel Siddiqui	United States Marine Corps	Marine Corps Recruit Depot Parris Island	Polytrauma due to falling	Private Raheel Siddiqui, a twenty-year-old Marine recruit, died after falling from a 40-foot-high stairwell landing while running from Gunnery Sgt. Joseph Felix, a drill instructor who had previously hazed him by ordering him into an industrial clothes dryer several times, causing burns. Allegations also surfaced that Felix had harassed Siddiqui, who was a Muslim with Pakistani ancestry, based on his religion, and called him a "terrorist." The drill instructor, Felix was charged in court-martial proceedings on a variety of charges, including cruelty and maltreatment. He received a ten-year sentence for maltreatment, violation of a lawful general order and dereliction of duty, making a false official statement, and drunk and disorderly conduct.
April 17, 2016	Michael Walker	Sigma Alpha Kappa (local fraternity)	Ferrum College	Alcohol intoxication	Walker died of alcohol intoxication after a hazing event.
October 27, 2016	Ryan Abele	Sigma Nu	University of Nevada, Reno	Alcohol intoxication	Abele suffered a fatal head injury while intoxicated with alcohol (BAC 0.40). On October 16, 2016, Abele, 18, was a freshman pledge when he was woken up with the rest of his pledge class at 5:45 a.m. following a party. Abele was ordered "to get the fuck down the stairs" where he slipped and fell, rupturing the main artery to his brain. Upon arrival at the hospital at 7:00 am, his BAC was found to be .30. Abele died the following week.
November 6, 2016	Rustam Nizamutdinova (non-pledge)	Kappa Sigma	University of Louisiana at Lafayette	Traffic collision	A Kappa Sigma pledge was kept awake for 72 hours as part of a hazing ritual. The pledge left to drive home, but fell asleep at the wheel, striking ULL student Nizamutdinova as he walked back to his apartment. The families of both Nizamutdinova and the pledge filed lawsuits against the fraternity.
February 4, 2017	Tim Piazza	Beta Theta Pi	Pennsylvania State University	Head injury	Piazza, a 19-year-old pledge of the fraternity, died two days after falling down the stairs while intoxicated. He suffered a collapsed lung, ruptured spleen, and non-recoverable brain injury following the fall. Paramedics were not summoned for nearly 12 hours. Piazza is estimated to have had a BAC of nearly .40 on the night of the fall. In May 2017, following a grand jury investigation, eighteen members of the fraternity were charged in connection with the death: eight were charged with involuntary manslaughter and the rest with other offenses, including hazing.
March 25, 2017	Harrison Carter Cole	Alpha Chi Sigma	Hampden–Sydney College	Alcohol intoxication	Cole was found dead in his dorm room after a hazing event at Alpha Chi Sigma. His family's lawsuit said Cole vomited multiple times during the party but did not receive medical attention. The lawsuit was settled for $2.35 million.
September 14, 2017	Maxwell Gruver	Phi Delta Theta	Louisiana State University	Alcohol intoxication	Gruver, an 18-year-old pledge from Roswell, Georgia, was taken to the hospital after an alleged drinking game hazing ritual known as "Bible Study". He was pronounced dead the same day. The cause of death was stated as being from "acute alcohol intoxication with aspiration". He had a blood-alcohol level of 0.495 — equivalent to consuming 24 standard shots.
November 3, 2017	Andrew Coffey	Pi Kappa Phi	Florida State University	Alcohol intoxication	Coffey, a 20-year-old pledge from Pompano Beach, Florida, was discovered unresponsive on Friday, November 3, after a house party occurred the previous night. It was determined that Coffey died of alcohol poisoning after drinking an entire bottle of bourbon. The coroner estimates that his blood alcohol level was 0.558 at the time of death.
November 13, 2017	Matthew Ellis	Phi Kappa Psi	Texas State University	Alcohol poisoning	Died at age 20.
September 16, 2018	Tyler Hilliard	Alpha Phi Alpha	University of California, Riverside	Congenital artery anomalies	Hilliard collapsed and died during hazing rituals that, according to interviews with other pledges, took place over five weeks. His family filed a lawsuit against the University of California system in 2023.
November 12, 2018	Collin Wiant	Sigma Pi	Ohio University	Asphyxia	Wiant, a freshman at Ohio University, died of asphyxiation due to nitrous oxide ingestion from whipped-cream chargers, an alleged part of a hazing practice involving sleep deprivation, physical beating, and the forced ingestion of alcohol and drugs.
January 12, 2019	Noah Domingo	Sigma Alpha Epsilon	UC Irvine	Alcohol intoxication	Domingo, 18, had a blood alcohol level of approximately 0.331 when he died around 3:30 a.m. on January 12, 2019, according to the Orange County Sheriff's Department.
March 17, 2019	Bea Castro	Chi Sigma Phi	California State University, Fullerton	Alcohol intoxication	On March 16, 2019, Bea Castro was allegedly hazed with dangerous quantities of alcohol. Castro was found unresponsive in a private home and was driven to the Garden Grove Hospital, where she was pronounced dead shortly after arrival.
April 17, 2019	Sebastian Serafin-Bazan	Sigma Pi	University at Buffalo	Cardiac arrest	Serafin-Bazan, 18, was found unresponsive on the lawn of the Sigma Pi house on April 12, 2019. He was pronounced dead five days later. According to Erie County District Attorney John Flynn, Serafin-Bazan was forced to perform several push-ups before collapsing. Preliminary toxicology reports found no drugs or alcohol in his system.
October 24, 2019	Antonio Tsialas	Phi Kappa Psi	Cornell University	Polytrauma due to falling	Tsialas, 18, was found dead in a gorge at Fall Creek on October 26, 2019, two days after attending a Christmas-themed frat party at Phi Kappa Psi. An autopsy found that Tsialas was drunk at the time of his death and had sustained multiple injuries. An investigation was unable to determine how Tsialas arrived at the gorge or the path he took after leaving the fraternity party. Phi Kappa Psi had been banned from hosting events at the time of Tsialas' death. In 2020, Cornell University settled a lawsuit with Tsialas' parents, which included allegations of hazing. The district attorney declined to pursue any criminal charges relating to Tsialas' death.
November 10, 2019	Dylan Hernandez	Phi Gamma Delta	San Diego State	Apparent head injury	Hernandez, 19, was reported to have attended an event at the Phi Gamma Delta house on November 6, 2019, then fell off his bed on the top bunk and hit his head; during the investigation, police uncovered information that alleges the fraternity was "involved in possible misconduct."
November 12, 2019	Sam Martinez	Alpha Tau Omega	Washington State University	Acute alcohol poisoning	Martinez, 19, died on November 12, 2019, after attending the Alpha Tau Omega promised event's big/small night. His cause of death, according to the Whitman County Coroner, was "acute alcoholism." During the "Big/Little Secret Night," the other 14 defendants were suspected of giving alcohol to other promised members of the ATO Brotherhood.

=== 2020s ===
Date of death	Victim	Organization	Institution	Cause of Death	Notes
July 16, 2020	Gracie LeAnn Dimit	Kappa Phi Alpha (local sorority)	Emory and Henry University	Traffic collision	Dimit and other sorority sisters partook in Emory and Henry College's 'The 500,' a tradition in which students would drive various streets near campus very quickly and dangerously, attempting to drift the cars. Dimit was sitting behind the driver's seat when a fishtail occurred, and the car flipped into trees.
January 30, 2021	James Gilfedder III	Lyon College Baseball Team	Lyon College	Alcohol intoxication	19-year-old Gilfedder attended a party at a residence partially owned by the Lyon College baseball coach that was also the residence of several members of the team. According to a lawsuit, Gilfedder was made to drink an excessive amount of alcohol at the party. He was found dead in his dorm room, and his death was determined to be due to alcohol poisoning.
February 27, 2021	Adam Oakes	Delta Chi	Virginia Commonwealth University	Alcohol intoxication	Oakes, a 19-year-old pledge, was told to consume large amounts of Jack Daniel's whiskey at a fraternity party the night of February 26, 2021. He was found dead the next morning.
March 7, 2021	Stone Foltz	Pi Kappa Alpha	Bowling Green State University	Alcohol intoxication	Foltz, a 20-year-old pledge, was allegedly told to consume 'copious amounts' of alcohol on the night of March 4, 2021. He was found unconscious by his roommates and flown to a Toledo hospital, where he was put on life support until his eventual death on March 7, 2021. His BAC was 0.394.
October 18, 2021	Lofton Hazelwood	FarmHouse	University of Kentucky	Alcohol intoxication	In October 2021, the FarmHouse chapter at the University of Kentucky contacted campus police "regarding reports of an unresponsive student." The student, later identified as Thomas "Lofton" Hazelwood, was taken to UK Albert B. Chandler Hospital in Lexington, Kentucky, where he was pronounced dead. Authorities said Hazelwood's death was the result of hazing, and a state anti-hazing law dubbed "Lofton's Law" was passed in response.
November 20, 2021	Phat Nguyen	Pi Alpha Phi	Michigan State University	Alcohol intoxication	The Pi Alpha Phi fraternity held an event where pledges drank excessive amounts of alcohol and wore women's shirts with the words "I'm gay" written on them. Nguyen, a 21-year-old pledge of the fraternity, was found unresponsive at 2 a.m. on November 20. In addition, four additional individuals were found unresponsive and transported to the local hospital. Despite performing cardiopulmonary resuscitation on Nguyen, firefighters were unable to save him.
February 2, 2023	Josh Mardis	Pi Beta Chi (unsanctioned fraternity)	James Madison University	Traffic collision	Following a hazing and rush event at a West Virginia strip club, five Pi Beta Chi members and pledges were involved in a car accident on a road near the Virginia state border in Mathias. Three people, including a pledge and two members, were killed. The driver, Campbell Fortune, was found to be under the influence of alcohol. The Pi Beta Chi fraternity is an unofficial offshoot of the Delta Chi fraternity, whose chapter was removed due to hazing in 2013.
February 2, 2023	John "Luke" Fergusson	Pi Beta Chi (unsanctioned fraternity)	James Madison University	Traffic collision	Following a hazing and rush event at a West Virginia strip club, five Pi Beta Chi members and pledges were involved in a car accident on a road near the Virginia state border in Mathias. Three people, including a pledge and two members, were killed. The driver, Campbell Fortune, was found to be under the influence of alcohol. The Pi Beta Chi fraternity is an unofficial offshoot of the Delta Chi fraternity, whose chapter was removed due to hazing in 2013.
February 2, 2023	Nicholas Troutman	Pi Beta Chi (unsanctioned fraternity)	James Madison University	Traffic collision	Following a hazing and rush event at a West Virginia strip club, five Pi Beta Chi members and pledges were involved in a car accident on a road near the Virginia state border in Mathias. Three people, including a pledge and two members, were killed. The driver, Campbell Fortune, was found to be under the influence of alcohol. The Pi Beta Chi fraternity is an unofficial offshoot of the Delta Chi fraternity, whose chapter was removed due to hazing in 2013.
July 10, 2024	Calvin "CJ" Dickey Jr.	Bucknell Bison football	Bucknell University	Sickle cell trait	On the first day of football training, Dickey and other freshmen football players were directed to perform 100 burpees and full-body plank drills as punishment for performing other drills incorrectly. Dickey died, and an autopsy attributed his death to the exercises and sickle cell trait. The strength and conditioning coach, who was leading the drills, was later charged with hazing and manslaughter.
February 27, 2025	Caleb Wilson	Omega Psi Phi	Southern University	Seizure caused by a blow to the chest	Wilson and other pledges were taking part in a ritual at a warehouse where fraternity members hit them with fists and objects. When Wilson was punched in the chest, he suffered a seizure that led to his death. According to sources, the fraternity members did not call 911. Fraternity members told police the ritual took place at a local park, not the warehouse.
January 31, 2026	Colin Daniel Martinez	Delta Tau Delta	Northern Arizona University	Alcohol intoxication	Martinez, an 18-year-old pledge at Delta Tau Delta, died after an event at an off-campus residence. Authorities said Martinez and three pledges were made to play a drinking game called "don't fuck your brother" that required the pledges to drink two handles of vodka. One witness told police that fraternity members Googled info on alcohol poisoning after hearing Martinez with an "unusual snore breath" around 3 a.m., leading them to check his pulse and adjust his sleeping position. Police were called at 8:44 a.m. after he was found unresponsive. Three members of the fraternity were charged with hazing, and the Delta Tau Delta chapter was closed by the national organization.
April 30, 2026	Savanna Jones	The Turtles	Wilberforce University	Alcohol intoxication	Jones was joining a social club known as "The Turtles" or "Turtle Club" where she and other new members were required to drink an entire bottle of liquor while answering questions and riddles. Jones fell unconscious and later died. A lawsuit accused resident assistants of not stepping in, despite the event taking place in a dorm room and the university having a dry-campus policy.

== See also ==
- Death of Logan Melgar
- Hazing in Greek letter organizations
- History of North American college fraternities and sororities
- Suicide of Danny Chen
- Suicide of Harry Lew
