= Death of Maxwell Gruver =

2017 hazing death in Louisiana, U.S.

- Date: September 14, 2017
- Location: Louisiana State University
- Cause: Acute alcohol intoxication with aspiration
- Organized by: Phi Delta Theta
- Participants: 18 to 20
- Deaths: 1

Maxwell Gruver died in a hazing ritual while pledging at the Louisiana State University chapter of Phi Delta Theta. He reportedly had condiments thrown at him while reciting the Greek alphabet and answering questions about the fraternity, and was forced to drink 190 proof alcohol if he made mistakes. His body was found the next day on September 14, 2017.

Phi Delta Theta suspended the university's chapter after the incident and ten men were arrested. Four of the men were indicted on charges of negligent homicide in March 2018.

Gruver was one of several pledges who died in hazing rituals nationwide in 2017, including Timothy Piazza at Penn State University, Andrew Coffey at Florida State University, and Matthew Ellis at Texas State University.

== Facts ==
Gruver was 18 years old when he died. The coroner said the cause of death was "acute alcohol intoxication with aspiration." Gruver's blood alcohol level was 0.495%, six times the legal limit.

In 2017, a warrant was issued for 10 members of the college fraternity Phi Delta Theta for the charge of hazing. On the night before his death Gruver attended what was called a "Bible Study" where pledges were asked questions about the fraternity and had to drink alcohol each time they answered incorrectly. They also had to perform some physical exercises during the "Bible Study" including wall sits while other members walked across their knees. The warrant stated that pledges were also required to lift other members while standing on a book. The pledges drank to excess and Gruver passed out on the couch and no one checked on him until 3:00 am at which time he was then left alone between 3:00 am and 9:00 am. At some point, he had also vomited remnants of spaghetti which blocked his airway. In the morning his pulse was weak and he was taken to a hospital. Medical examiners confirmed he had died around 4 am that morning.

== Grand jury ==
The grand jury declined to bring charges in one case and failed to reach consensus in four others. They indicted four men on charges of negligent homicide. There was no consensus whether the national fraternal organization was criminally liable for the death.

== Consequences ==
Matthew Naquin was convicted of negligent homicide in July 2019 for his role in the hazing. Naquin had previously been asked by other fraternity members to tone down interactions with pledges that they described as "extreme and dangerous". In November 2019, Naquin was sentenced to five years in prison (of which one-half – 30 months – was immediately suspended), followed by three years probation.

After the incident, the Louisiana State University chapter of Phi Delta Theta was suspended, until at least 2033, by the fraternity's national organization. They also terminated the memberships of the accused, issuing a statement that the termination "effectively severs ties with those alleged to be involved."

The Louisiana State Legislature passed the Max Gruver Act in 2018, which made hazing a felony.

In March 2023, his parents, Steven and Rae Ann Gruver, were awarded $6.1 million by a jury in Baton Rouge in a civil suit against a fraternity member and his insurance company. His parents also received settlements from the seventeen other defendants, including Louisiana State University and the Phi Delta Theta fraternity. They established The Max Gruver Foundation to provide education about the dangers of hazing to various colleges.
