= An American Soldier (opera) =

Opera show based on the suicide of Danny Chen

- Opera by Huang Ruo
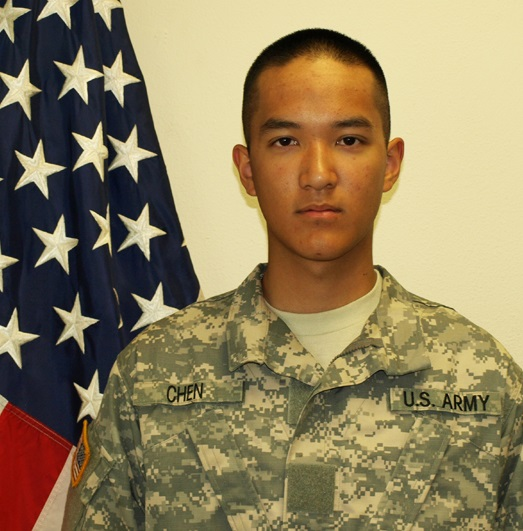
- Private Danny Chen, the opera's protagonist
- Librettist: David Henry Hwang
- Language: English
- Premiere: 13 June 2014; John F. Kennedy Center for the Performing Arts, Washington, DC

An American Soldier is an opera in two acts composed by Huang Ruo to a libretto by playwright David Henry Hwang. It initially premiered in a one-act version in 2014 and was subsequently expanded to two acts. The two-act version had its world premiere on 3 June 2018 during the Opera Theatre of Saint Louis festival. A New York production ran from 12-19 May 2024 at PAC NYC. The opera is based on a true story, the suicide of Danny Chen, a Chinese-American U.S. Army soldier who had been subjected to racial harassment and beatings by his fellow soldiers. Chen died in 2011 at his U.S. Army post in Afghanistan from a self-inflicted gunshot wound.

== Background and performance history ==
=== 2014 version ===
Danny Chen's death in 2011 had led to the courts-martial and convictions of several soldiers in Chen's company and sparked a national debate about hazing and racism in the U.S. armed forces. Elizabeth R. OuYang, a civil rights attorney and at the time president of the New York chapter of OCA Asian Pacific American Advocates, approached David Henry Hwang with a view to him writing a play about the affair. Hwang, however, felt that the themes were possibly more suited to an opera. He contacted composer Huang Ruo who had just received a commission from Washington National Opera's American Opera Initiative to compose a short opera based on a contemporary American story and was looking for a suitable subject. The result of Hwang and Ruo's collaboration was An American Soldier, a 60-minute chamber opera with much of the libretto based on the transcripts of the courts-martial. The libretto is primarily in English, with small portions in Chinese, notably the opening chorus.

An American Soldier premiered on 13 June 2014 at the Kennedy Center's Terrace Theater with Andrew Stenson as Danny Chen and Guang Yang as his mother. The production was designed and directed by David Paul and conducted by Steven Jarvi. Chen's parents attended the premiere, but left halfway through the performance after an emotionally upsetting scene in which their son was stoned by some of his fellow soldiers.

In her review of the premiere for The Washington Post'', Anne Midgette wrote that the "quasi-Asian effects" in the orchestral score provided "not only textural richness but also an evocative illustration of the challenges Chen faced trying to blend his Chinese and American identities." However, she found a "disconnect" between the libretto and the score itself and noted that the vocal writing tended to be dynamically monotonous. She ascribed this to a general tendency in contemporary operas to have the "characters consistently sing from a place of heightened emotional intensity." Tim Smith writing in Opera News similarly complained about the "generic, declamatory quality" of the vocal writing. He contrasted this with the orchestral writing noting its "intensely communicative dissonance" which he attributed to Huang Ruo's "flair for exploiting tonal extremes in the instruments."

=== 2018 version ===
In February 2016, Timothy O'Leary, General Director Opera Theatre of Saint Louis announced that as part of its New Works, Bold Voices series, the festival had commissioned Huang Ruo and David Hwang to expand their 2014 version of An American Soldier to a full-length opera. The 2014 version was expanded from one act to two and its running was doubled to two hours, allowing for more development of the characters through the addition of more monologue arias. Relying less heavily on the courts-martial transcripts than the 2014 version, the expanded libretto adds new material which explores the relationship between the characters in more depth, especially that between Danny Chen and his mother. A new main character was added, Josephine Young, a high school friend of Danny's who gave up her "creative dreams" to follow her parents' wish that she become a doctor. Four new minor roles were also added, including two women soldiers in Chen's company. For the final scene, Ruo composed an additional chorus, "E pluribus unum", which echoes a traditional motto of the United States.

The world premiere of the expanded version of An American Soldier took place on 3 June 2018 at the Loretto-Hilton Center for the Performing Arts on the campus of Webster University. Andrew Stenson reprised the role of Danny Chen, and Mika Shigematsu sang the role of Chen's mother. The production was directed by Matthew Ozawa and conducted by Michael Christie.

== Scoring ==
The score of the 2014 version was written for a 13-musician chamber orchestra with some of the musicians playing more than one instrument. In addition to strings, woodwinds, brasses and bass and snare drums, the instruments included a didgeridoo, Chinese opera gong, Indonesian button gong, and metal wind chimes. The orchestra for the 2018 version was expanded to 35 musicians.

== Synopsis ==
Setting: Fort Bragg army base in 2012 during the court-martial of Sgt. Adam Holcomb (portrayed in the opera by the character Sgt. Aaron Marcum).

The opera opens with the court-martial of Sgt. Aaron Marcum and Danny Chen's anguished mother pleading for justice for her son. The courtroom scenes and the soldiers' testimony are interleaved with flashbacks depicting the events leading up to Chen's death and his life in New York before he enlisted in the army against the wishes of his mother. Chen appears not only in the flashbacks but also as a ghost addressing his mother in the courtroom. In the final scene the chorus of soldiers sing "E pluribus unum". Chen's mother holds his ghost's hand to her cheek and sings a lullaby from his childhood. Soldiers fold the flag draped over his coffin and hand it to Danny. He hands it to his mother and salutes.

== Roles ==
Role	Voice type	Original version Premiere cast 13 June 2014 (Conductor: Steven Jarvi)	Expanded version Premiere cast 3 June 2018 (Conductor: Michael Christie)
Danny Chen	tenor	Andrew Stenson	Andrew Stenson
Danny Chen's mother	mezzo-soprano	Guang Yang	Mika Shigematsu
Sgt. Aaron Marcum, Chen's chief tormentor	baritone	Trevor Scheunemann	Wayne Tigges
Josephine Young, Chen's high school friend	soprano	(not in this version)	Kathleen Kim
Military judge	bass	Soloman Howard	Nathan Stark
Major Rose, military prosecution lawyer	bass	Michael Ventura	Phillip Lopez
Major Baker, military defense lawyer	tenor	Jonathan Blalock	Matthew Dalen
Pvt. Roderic Carter	tenor	Jonathan Blalock	Matthew Dalen
Spc. Austin Haldemann	bass	Michael Ventura	Phillip Lopez
Spc. Julian Swanson	bass	Michael Ventura	Andrew Munn
Spc. Cameron Rodriguez	tenor	Jonathan Blalock	Ángel Vargas
Brian Young, Chen's best friend	baritone	Andrew McLaughlin	(not in this version)
Sgt. Lucas Brown	baritone	Andrew McLaughlin	Evan Bravos
Pvt. Roman Parker	baritone	Andrew McLaughlin	Samson McCrady
Sgt. Jackson Blakemore	baritone	Andrew McLaughlin	Samson McCrady
Pvt. Manny Davis	bass	Soloman Howard	Babatunde Akinboboye
Pvt. Washington	bass	(not in this version)	Babatunde Akinboboye
Pvt. Pinkton	bass	(not in this version)	Andrew Munn
Pvt. Stanton	mezzo-soprano	(not in this version)	Briana Hunter
Pvt. Sonia Gonzales	soprano	(not in this version)	Andrea Núñez
