= Jetliner (disambiguation) =

A jetliner is an airliner propelled by jet engines.

Jetliner or jet liner may also refer to:

- Avro Canada C102 Jetliner, a particular jet airliner
- Carstedt Jet Liner 600, a conversion of the de Havilland Dove short range airliner to turboprop power
- Jetliner position, a form of physical torment common during China's Cultural Revolution

== See also ==
- Jet Airliner (disambiguation)
