= Robert Champion =

Robert Champion may refer to:

- Bob Champion (born 1948), English jump jockey
- Robert Champion, Drum Major who died in hazing incident
