= The Gordie Foundation =

American nonprofit organization

Gordie Center
- Founded: 2004
- Founder: Michael Lanahan, Leslie Lanahan
- Type: Health education
- Purpose: Substance misuse and hazing prevention
- Location(s): Gordie Center; University of Virginia; P.O. Box 800139; Charlottesville, VA 22903
- Origins: Following the 2004 hazing death of Lynn Gordon Bailey Jr. ("Gordie") at the University of Colorado
- Region served: United States, Canada
- Website: http://www.gordie.org http://gordiecenter.studenthealth.virginia.edu/

The Gordie Center is a 501(c)(3) non-profit organization that was founded in Dallas, Texas as the Gordie Foundation. The name of the non-profit changed in 2010 when the Gordie Foundation merged with the University of Virginia's Center for Alcohol and Substance Education to form the Gordie Center. The foundation's mission is "to end hazing and substance misuse among college and high school students nationwide." The foundation was created in memory of 18-year-old Gordie Bailey, who died on September 17, 2004, following a hazing incident involving alcohol in the Chi Psi fraternity house at the University of Colorado in Boulder, Colorado. Actress Robin Wright was the Gordie Foundation's honorary spokesperson.

== Background ==
Gordie Bailey (1986-2004)

On the evening of September 16, 2004, Lynn Gordon Bailey Jr. ("Gordie"), an 18-year-old freshman at the University of Colorado's Leeds School of Business, and 26 other Chi Psi pledges were blindfolded and dressed in coats and ties for "bid night." They were taken to a bonfire in the Arapaho Roosevelt National Forest, where they were ordered to consume four 1.75-liter bottles of 80-proof bourbon whiskey and six 1.5 liter bottles of wine in 30 minutes. Older active fraternity men stated to the group that "no one is leaving here until these are gone." When the group returned to the fraternity lodge, Bailey was visibly intoxicated and did not drink any more. He was placed on a couch to "sleep it off" at approximately 11:00 p.m. Later in the evening while Bailey was unconscious, the fraternity members used permanent markers to write demeaning words and pictures on his body. Bailey was left alone for 10 hours before he was found dead the next morning, face down on the floor.

== Litigation ==
Following Bailey's death, his mother Leslie Lanahan brought legal action against the Alpha Psi Delta of Chi Psi. Following four and a half years of negotiation, the two sides agreed to a settlement in March 2009. Among the terms, Chi Psi agreed that Bailey had been hazed by brothers of the chapter on the evening of September 16, 2004. The fraternity also agreed to use Bailey's story in all pledge education about hazing, as well as to require that all chapters recruit a live-in adult supervisor. Details of the financial portion of the settlement were not disclosed.

== Foundation ==
The Gordie Foundation seeks to raise public awareness of the consequences of alcohol abuse among students, which kills more than 1,700 students annually. The foundation encourages students to "save a life" and "make the call" for help to prevent alcohol-related deaths.

== HAZE documentary ==
The Gordie Foundation, with director Pete Schuermann, produced a documentary film entitled HAZE that explores the college environment that leads to alcohol-related deaths like Bailey's. The film explores college binge and competitive drinking and hazing and the risks associated with such behavior. HAZE features graphic and disturbing scenes of consequences of alcohol abuse and acts of hazing. The film was updated in 2018 and released on Gordie's birthday, February 22.

The film premiered at the Hamptons International Film Festival. It has also been shown at the Dallas International Film Festival. the Newport Beach Film Festival and the Indie Spirit Film Festival in Colorado Springs, Colorado. In 2011, it was shown at the Virginia Film Festival in Charlottesville, Virginia.

== See also ==
- List of hazing deaths in the United States
