= Jet Airliner =

Jet Airliner may refer to:

- Jet airliner, an aeroplane powered by jet engines
- "Jet Airliner" (Steve Miller Band song), a 1977 song composed by Paul Pena and popularized by the Steve Miller Band
- "Jet Airliner" (Modern Talking song), Modern Talking's first single from the fifth album Romantic Warriors

== See also ==
- Jetliner (disambiguation)
