= Death of Stone Foltz =

2021 death in Ohio, United States

Stone Foltz
- Born: Stone Justin Foltz; November 21, 2000; Delaware, Ohio, U.S.
- Died: March 7, 2021 (aged 20); Toledo, Ohio, U.S.
- Cause of death: Alcohol intoxication, BAC .394
- Education: Buckeye Valley High School; Bowling Green State University
- Known for: Circumstances of his death

Stone Justin Foltz (November 21, 2000 – March 7, 2021), a sophomore Bowling Green State University (BGSU) student, died of alcohol intoxication three days after attending a Pi Kappa Alpha new member initiation event held at an off-campus house. On April 29, 2021, eight men were indicted for hazing, six of whom were further charged with manslaughter in connection with the event.

The fraternity's national organization revoked the chapter's charter. In April 2021, the university permanently expelled Pi Kappa Alpha. Stone's death prompted renewed interest in the Ohio General Assembly to pass "Collin's Law", a bill to make hazing a felony in Ohio. It was signed into law on July 6, 2021.

In January 2023, BGSU and the Foltz family agreed to a settlement of $2.9 million, the largest hazing payout by a public university in the history of Ohio.

== Background ==
The chapter originally started in 1927 as the locally founded Commoners Fraternity. While not the oldest fraternity on campus, the Commoners became the first at BGSU to receive a national charter in 1942. They were then named the Delta Beta chapter of Pi Kappa Alpha.

The Delta Beta chapter of Pi Kappa Alpha had been reported for hazing prior to the Spring 2021 semester. In December 2018, an anonymous tip was made to the university by the roommate of a Pi Kappa Alpha member detailing alleged sleep deprivation and members being forced to fight each other in their underwear, in a deeply dug hole.

In fall 2018, several members of the chapter posted a picture of themselves on Instagram which featured them dressed as stereotypical cholos for Halloween. The picture was captioned, "Your culture IS my costume #CholoGang." The chapter soon deleted the post, released an apology statement, and the students involved were suspended from the fraternity for one year. A university investigation found that the students were protected by the First Amendment and were not found to have violated the Code of Conduct.

In November 2019, the university received another report concerning the chapter forcing new members to drink a "family drink" at the fraternity's "Big/Little" reveal party.

From December 9, 2019, to May 8, 2020, the Pi Kappa Alpha national organization placed the chapter on probation.

On February 7, 2021, Foltz and eight other students pledged to join Pi Kappa Alpha. They were given a "New Member Handbook" and told to attend all ritual events, one of which was the March 4 hazing event. Prior to the event, they were told to inform their professors of the possibility that they would be absent from class the next day.

== Hazing incident ==
On March 4, 2021, Foltz and the other new members of the fraternity arrived at 8:30 P.M. to the off-campus house, known to members as the "Bando". They were dressed in formal attire, and told to use their ties as blindfolds before being led inside single-file. While being led to the basement, they were pushed and yelled at while being disoriented by loud music.

Once in the basement, their blindfolds were removed and they were introduced to their respective "Big", an older member who would serve as a mentor in the fraternity. As part of the ritual, new members were heavily pressured to drink a fifth (approximately 750 ml) of high-alcohol liquor. However, the new members were not told that finishing the bottle was required to continue the pledge process. Each "Little" was gifted a bottle of the "family drink", which in the case of Foltz, was Evan Williams whiskey. They then began drinking their bottles. According to an eyewitness, Foltz finished his bottle in only 18 minutes.

The organizers of the event placed empty trash cans in the basement of the Bando in anticipation of the Littles throwing up. Witnesses reported that Foltz threw up and had trouble walking. His Big and two other members led him to a car and drove him to his apartment. They then left him alone on his couch after spending some time with him in the apartment.

Half an hour later, at approximately 10:30 P.M, a roommate came home and called Foltz's girlfriend to help him look after the unconscious Foltz. Soon after, he stopped breathing, and his face turned blue. Foltz's girlfriend called 911 at 11:23 P.M, as the roommate performed CPR. Once paramedics arrived at 11:25 P.M, Foltz was taken to Wood County Hospital, then airlifted to Promedica Hospital in Toledo. His blood alcohol content was .394%. Despite their best efforts, the doctors could not save him, and his body was prepared for organ donation.

Foltz died on March 7, 2021. His heart, lungs, liver, kidneys, and other organs were able to be donated.

== Aftermath ==
On March 5, 2021, the Delta Beta chapter was placed on interim suspension by the university. Pi Kappa Alpha nationals also placed the chapter on suspension the same day and condemned the actions of the Delta Beta chapter. BGSU suspended all Greek life activity for the semester, including recruitment and all on and off-campus events for all chapters until a recommitment plan could be submitted by each.

On March 7, university workers removed the Pi Kappa Alpha Greek letters from the on-campus fraternity house, as they had lost recognition as a student organization.

A student-organized protest was held outside the fraternity's former on-campus house on March 9. A memorial was crafted featuring a picture of Foltz, along with candles and flowers. The students then marched to the McFall Center and aired grievances concerning Greek life and the insecurities they felt on campus as a result of Stone Foltz's death. BGSU President Rodney Rogers did not attend the protest, as he was in a phone call with Ohio Governor Mike DeWine and other university presidents of Ohio discussing hazing.

A memorial was organized by the BGSU Undergraduate Student Government on March 17. President Rogers, Foltz's roommate, Foltz's girlfriend, and others spoke about the tragedy.

Foltz's death prompted Pi Kappa Alpha to suspend recruitment nationwide for the Spring 2021 semester. The fraternity also voted to expel every active member of the Delta Beta chapter and revoked its charter.

== University proceedings ==
BGSU launched an independent investigation into the incident and the Delta Beta chapter. The chapter was immediately placed on interim suspension.

On April 9, 2021, the chapter was found guilty of the following charges and permanently expelled from campus.

- Offenses Against Persons – Harm to Others: Encouraging members to consume an entire bottle of alcohol.
- Offenses Against Persons – Hazing: Encouraging members to consume an entire bottle of alcohol.
- Offenses Against Persons – Hazing: Making members wear blindfolds while being pushed and yelled at.
- Offenses Against Persons – Hazing: Members being told to inform their professors of their likely absence from classes the next day.
- Offenses Against Persons – Hazing: Hazing and underage alcohol possession are against the law and university policy.
- Offenses Disrupting Order or Disregarding Health and Safety – Organization Alcohol: Alcohol was given to new members despite only one of them being of the legal age to consume alcohol.

On July 30, 2021, BGSU announced the expulsion of three students and the suspension of 18 additional students for the hazing event.

== Criminal proceedings ==
In September 2021, Niall Sweeney reached a plea deal in which all his charges were dropped except for one count of felony tampering with evidence.

In October 2021, Aaron Lehane pled guilty to 11 of his 17 charges, including tampering with evidence and hazing.

In April 2022, Jarrett Prizel pled guilty to a series of charges including involuntary manslaughter.

== Civil proceedings ==
=== Shari Foltz v. Pi Kappa Alpha et al. ===
On May 12, 2021, Stone Foltz's mother, Shari Foltz, brought a civil lawsuit against Pi Kappa Alpha, the Delta Beta chapter, as well as ten others for the wrongful death of her son. The Foltz family was represented by the Columbus-based Cooper Elliott law firm and attorneys Sean Alto and Rex Elliott.

On January 23, 2023, BGSU agreed to pay US$2.9 million, as well as partner with the Foltz family to eliminate hazing. It is "the largest payout by a public university in a hazing case in Ohio history," according to the family's attorney Rex Elliott.

The other defendants, including Pi Kappa Alpha, agreed to pay a combined US$7.2 million to the family. Despite the judgment, Rex Elliott acknowledged that it may be difficult to collect the payments from defendants, including the president of the fraternity Daylen Dunson, who was not present during court hearings and never responded to the lawsuit.

== See also ==
- Death of Tim Piazza
- Andrew Coffey lawsuit
- Hazing in Greek letter organizations
