= Wine Psi Phi =

African American collegiate fraternity

- WΨΦ
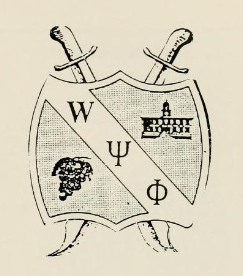
- Founded: March 2, 1959; 67 years ago Howard University
- Type: Cultural
- Affiliation: Independent
- Status: Defunct
- Emphasis: African American
- Scope: National
- Motto: "To build rather than to tear down"
- Pillars: Brotherhood, Character, Leadership, Service, Responsibility, and Scholarship
- Colors: Burgundy and Blue
- Symbol: Grapes
- Chapters: 34 (inactive)
- Headquarters: 756 East 111th Street; Chicago, Illinois 60628; United States
- Website: winepsiphisso.net

W.I.N.E. Psi Phi (WΨΦ) was an African American collegiate fraternity. It was established at Howard University in 1959 as a non-exclusive alternative to the traditional black Greek letter organizations. In later years, many chapters operated as a co-ed "frarority". Today, its collegiate chapters are all inactive, with just a single graduate chapter remaining.

== History ==
Wine Psi Phi was formed as a social activist organization called HUMS. Students Roy Brown, John Mason, and Allen Cherry established HUMS at Howard University on March 2, 1959. It formed from the social activism of the Civil Rights Movement and as an alternative to the "fictitious title of Black Greek". Its founders dismissed the notion that civilization stemmed from the ancient Greeks and instead considered ancient Egypt to be the "cradle of civilization". The organization was created as a non-exclusive group.

The motto of HUMS was "We Initiate New Experiences" In 1962, HUMS became W.I.N.E. Psi Phi, also written as Wine Psi Phi. The fraternity was chartered with the university that same year. One of its stated missions was "to reunite lost and wondering minds back to Earthly Understanding".

Chapters were established at Florida A&M University in 1966 and at Bluefield State University and Cheyney State University in 1967 when members transferred from Howard. This was followed by a chapter at Lincoln University in 1967. Wine Psi Phi continued to expand across the United States, mostly at historically black colleges and universities.

Its sister sorority was WINE Psi Phi Twins. Later chapters, such as the one at the University of Illinois, operated as a coed "frarority". However, the collegiate chapters dwindled over time and went inactive, leaving only a few active graduate chapters.

=== Reformation efforts ===
Beginning in September 2018, the fraternity's national headquarters was hosted by the Durham City graduate chapter in Durham, North Carolina. In the early 2010s, there was a division in the organization, with the Chicago graduate chapter obtaining the copyright and trademark of the name Wine Psi Phi which had lapsed in October 2014. At its April 23, 2022, national grand cluster or convention, the fraternity's Grand Council met to discuss the problem and to select a new name as it could no longer legally use the historic name WINE Psi Phi. The Durham City chapter was reincorporated as Gamma Alpha Fei on September 28, 2022. The Chicago chapter continues to operate as W.I.N.E. PSI PHI Social Service Organization Inc. Both of these organizations claim Wine Psi Phi collegiate fraternity as their origin.

== Symbols and traditions ==
The fraternity's name WINE is an acronym for its original motto, "We Initiate New Experiences". Its pledge club was called the Grapes and its symbol was a bunch of grapes. Its president was called the Supreme Grand Grape or Grand Grapette. Many of its chapter's names related to types of wine.

The fraternity's colors were burgundy and blue, with the former being selected as the color of wine. The fraternity's motto was "To build rather than to tear down". Its principals or pillars were Brotherhood, Character, Leadership, Service, Responsibility, and Scholarship.

Historically, Wine Psi Phi pledges were required to participate in the "Cross the Burning Sands" initiation ritual by drinking a fifth of wine. As campus attitudes toward hazing and alcohol changed, drinking alcohol was no longer required for membership in the fraternity.

== Activities ==
Wine Psi Phi was involved in campus activity committees and favored booking George Clinton's Parliament for events such as homecoming. The fraternity was known for its performances in step shows. Its members also participated in intramural sports. Its charitable activities included food drives to provide holiday meals for families in need, funding scholarships, volunteering with Big Brothers Big Sisters, and sponsoring a breakfast program for Head Start students.

== Chapters ==
=== Collegiate chapters ===
Following is a list of known collegiate chapters of Wine Psi Phi. Inactive chapters and institutions are listed in italics.

| Chapter | Charter date | Institution | Location | Status | Ref. |
|---|---|---|---|---|---|
| | March 2, 1959 | Howard University | Washington, D.C. | Inactive | |
| | 1966 | Florida A&M University | Tallahassee, Florida | Inactive | |
| | 1967 | Bluefield State College | Bluefield, West Virginia | Inactive | |
| | 1967 | Cheyney University of Pennsylvania | Cheyney, Pennsylvania | Inactive | |
| | 1968 | Lincoln University | Oxford, Pennsylvania | Inactive | |
| Concord | January 25, 1969 | Saint Augustine's University | Raleigh, North Carolina | Inactive | |
| | 1969–1975 ? | Kittrell College | Kittrell, North Carolina | Inactive | (Note: Chapter was founded in 1969, and incorporated on May 8, 1973.) (Note: The college closed in 1976.) |
| Richards | 1969 | Northern Illinois University | DeKalb, Illinois | Inactive | |
| | 1972 | Delaware State University | Dover, Delaware | Inactive | |
| Akadama Plum | 1973 | Lewis University | Romeoville, Illinois | Inactive | |
| Nu Viking | 197x ? | Elizabeth City State University | Elizabeth City, North Carolina | Inactive | |
| | 197x ? | South Carolina State University | Orangeburg, South Carolina | Inactive | |
| | 197x ? | North Carolina Central University | Durham, North Carolina | Inactive | |
| | December 15, 1977 | Fayetteville State University | Fayetteville, North Carolina | Inactive | |
| | 19xx ?–1979 | Virginia State University | Ettrick, Virginia | Inactive | (Note: College closed the chapter after a death from a hazing incident.) |
| Annie Green Springs | October 1979 | Chicago State University | Chicago, Illinois | Inactive | |
| | | Benedict College | Columbia, South Carolina | Inactive | |
| Pineapple Smash | | Bradley University | Peoria, Illinois | Inactive | |
| Sangria | | Clark Atlanta University, Morris Brown College, and Spellman College | Atlanta, Georgia | Inactive | |
| Bali Hai | | Eastern Illinois University | Charleston, Illinois | Inactive | |
| Cherry Kirsberry | | Eureka College | Eureka, Illinois | Inactive | |
| Cold Bear | | Illinois Benedictine College | Lisle, Illinois | Inactive | |
| Spanada | | Illinois State University | Normal, Illinois | Inactive | |
| Ait Mo Gai | | Kennedy–King College | Chicago, Illinois | Inactive | |
| | | Morehouse College | Atlanta, Georgia | Inactive | |
| | | Morgan State University | Baltimore, Maryland | Inactive | |
| | | Morris College | Sumter, South Carolina | Inactive | |
| MD 20/20 – Wolf & Sons | | Olive–Harvey College | Chicago, Illinois | Inactive | |
| | | Shaw University | Raleigh, North Carolina | Inactive | |
| TJ Swan | | Southern Illinois University | Carbondale, Illinois | Inactive | |
| | | Southern University at Baton Rouge | Baton Rouge, Louisiana | Inactive | |
| Akadama Red | | Thornton Community College | South Holland, Illinois | Inactive | |
| Whiteport | | University of Illinois | Urbana, Illinois | Inactive | |
| Chianti | | University of Wisconsin–Stevens Point | Stevens Point, Wisconsin | Inactive | |

=== Graduate chapters ===
Following is an incomplete list of WINE Psi Phi graduate chapters. Active chapters are indicated in bold. Inactive chapters are indicated in italics.

| Chapter | Charter date and range | Location | Status | Ref. |
|---|---|---|---|---|
| Durham City Graduate Chapter | April 30, 2011 – September 28, 2022 | Durham, North Carolina | Withdrew | (Note: Chapter was reincorporated as Gamma Alpha Fei in 2022 after it could no longer legally use the name WINE Psi Phi.) |
| **W.I.N.E. PSI PHI Social Service Organization** | | Chicago, Illinois | Active | |

== Controversies ==
On April 5, 1975, a Northern Illinois University chapter's pledge, Richard A. Gowins, died after an initiation ritual that required him to drink a half gallon of mixed wine, tequila, and gin in an hour. A coroner's jury ruled the death accidental.

At Virginia State University, pledge Robert Etheridge drowned while trying to rescue Norsha Lynn Delk, a pledge for the sorority Delta Sigma Theta; both were attempting to swim in the Appomattox River, fully clothed, as part of a quasi-baptism ritual on March 22, 1979. The university banned the chapter and the sorority after the incident.

== See also ==
- Cultural interest fraternities and sororities
- List of African-American fraternities
- List of hazing deaths in the United States
