= Suicide of Danny Chen =

2011 suicide of an American soldier

PV2 Danny Chen
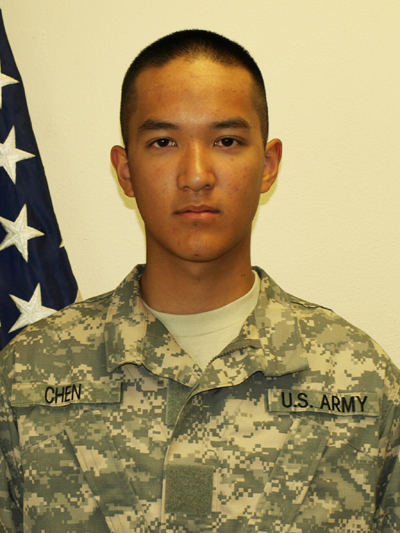
- Army portrait of Chen
- Born: May 26, 1992; New York City, U.S.
- Died: October 3, 2011 (aged 19); Kandahar, Afghanistan
- Cause of death: Suicide by gunshot
- Other name: Chén Yǔhuī (陳宇暉)
- Education: Pace University High School; Baruch College, CUNY
- Occupation: United States Army
- Parents: Yan Tao Chen (father); Suzhen Chen (mother)
- Awards

Suicide of Danny Chen
- Date: October 3, 2011; 15 years ago
- Location: Kandahar, Afghanistan
- Type: Suicide by gunshot
- Deaths: Danny Chen, aged 19
- Convicted: Adam Michael Holcomb; Ryan J. Offutt; Travis Carden; Andrew J. Van Bockel
- Charges: Holcomb: Negligent homicide; Reckless endangerment; Communicating a threat; Assault; Maltreatment of a subordinate; Dereliction of duty; Violating a lawful general regulation; Offutt: Hazing; Mistreatment (2 counts); Carden: Attempting to impede an investigation; Striking and pushing another soldier; Negligently discharging a pistol in a government van; VanBockel: Hazing; Dereliction of duty; Maltreatment of a subordinate
- Verdict: Holcomb: Guilty of assault, not guilty on remaining charges Offutt and Carden: Pleaded guilty VanBockel: Guilty
- Sentence: Holcomb: 30 days in jail, $1,100 fine Offutt: Bad Conduct Discharge; Carden: 10 months in prison, plus Bad Conduct Discharge; VanBockel: 45 days in jail, plus 15 days of hard labor

Danny Chen (simplified Chinese: 陈宇晖; traditional Chinese: 陳宇暉; pinyin: Chén Yǔhuī; Jyutping: can4 jyu5 fai1; May 26, 1992 – October 3, 2011) was an American U.S. Army soldier who served during the War in Afghanistan. His suicide resulted in a military investigation and charges against eight US soldiers, ultimately with four being court martialed.

The investigation found that Chen had been "racially harassed, teased, bullied, and mercilessly beaten" by his fellow soldiers before he committed suicide on October 3, 2011.

== Early life ==
Chen was born and raised in Chinatown, Manhattan, New York City, to parents who had immigrated from Sunning, Canton Province, South China. His father worked as a chef, his mother worked as a seamstress.

Chen attended P.S. 130 M, graduated from Pace University High School in Manhattan in 2010, and received a full scholarship offer to Baruch College, City University of New York in Manhattan. However, Chen had other ambitions and joined the Army in January 2011. He planned after his military service to return to New York City to serve with the New York City Police Department.

== Career ==
After completing basic training at Fort Benning, Georgia, in April 2011, Pvt. Chen was assigned to C Company, 3rd Battalion, 21st Infantry Regiment, 1st Stryker Brigade Combat Team, 25th Infantry Division, which is based in Fort Wainwright, Alaska. In August, he was deployed with his unit to Kandahar Province in Afghanistan.

== Death at base ==
On October 3, two months after his deployment, Chen was found dead from a self-inflicted gunshot wound in his living quarters at the base in Kandahar province, Afghanistan.

The official investigation revealed that Private Chen “had been subjected to physical abuse and ethnic slurs, taunts, and insults by superiors, who one night dragged him out of bed and across the floor like a ragdoll when he failed to turn off a water heater after showering.” The military did not provide much information to the parents while they were conducting their investigation.

Military investigators found that Chen was “the target of ethnic slurs, taunts, and insults, and endured physical attacks at the hands of his fellow soldiers before his death”. Chen was found to have been physically and verbally mistreated and abused by his superiors, who appeared to single him out for being Chinese-American. This abuse and bullying occurred on a daily basis for six weeks before his death. As the first and only American soldier with Chinese ancestry in the unit, he was singled out, endured taunts including racial slurs and insults such as "gook", "chink", "Jackie Chan", "Soy Sauce", and "dragon lady"; assigned excessive guard duty to the point of exhaustion, made to do push-ups while holding water in his mouth, and put in a "simulated sitting position" and mercilessly kicked by other soldiers using their knees, among other abuses, bullying, or violent tactics.

He was allegedly pelted with rocks and stones by fellow soldiers and forced to crawl across gravel shortly before his death. On September 27, 2011, a sergeant dragged Chen out of bed and over 15 metres (49 ft) of gravel, leaving visible bruises and cuts on Chen's back. Although the incident was reported to Chen's platoon sergeant and squad leader, it was not reported to superior officers. On October 3, 2011, the day he died, other soldiers forced him to crawl on gravel for over 100 metres (330 ft) while carrying equipment, as his comrades “mercilessly threw rocks and stones at him without showing any remorse”.

== Burial ==
Chen received a military funeral at a cemetery in Valhalla, New York, on October 13, 2011.

== Investigation and legal consequences ==
On December 21, 2011, the US Army charged eight soldiers with various crimes relating to Chen's death:

- 1st Lt. Daniel J. Schwartz
- Staff Sgt. Blaine G. Dugas
- Staff Sgt. Andrew J. Van Bockel
- Sgt. Travis F. Carden
- Sgt. Adam M. Holcomb
- Sgt. Jeffrey T. Hurst
- Spc. Thomas P. Curtis
- Spc. Ryan J. Offutt

All the defendants belonged to C Company, 3rd Battalion, 21st Infantry Regiment, 1st Stryker Brigade Combat Team, 25th Infantry Division. They faced various charges, including assault, hate crime, name calling, bullying, dereliction of duty, involuntary manslaughter, maltreatment, making false statements, negligent homicide, and reckless endangerment.

Following a series of Article 32 hearings on March 5, 2012, investigators dropped the most serious charge, involuntary manslaughter, which carries a maximum penalty of ten years in prison. Four of the eight soldiers were recommended for court-martial on the remaining charges, such as negligent homicide, which carries a maximum penalty of three years in prison. Subsequent trials were held at Fort Bragg in North Carolina.

== Platoon leader ==
First Lieutenant Daniel Schwartz of Maryland, a 2009 graduate of West Point, was Chen's platoon leader. Following a pretrial hearing at Kandahar Air Field, he was recommended for court-martial on February 12, 2012. He faced eight counts of dereliction of duty, including failure to promote "a climate in which everyone is treated with dignity and respect, regardless of race" and "to prevent his subordinates from maltreating and engaging in racially abusive language." Furthermore, he stood "accused of failing to report two soldiers for consuming alcohol in violation of military rules and failing to report one of those soldiers for 'recklessly' detonating a hand grenade near their base."

Schwartz reached a plea deal with prosecutors in December 2012, after they consulted with Chen's parents about the issues. Schwartz did not face trial and charges against him were dropped, but he was dismissed from the Army following a nonpublic Article 15 proceeding. Specifics regarding his punishment were not disclosed.

== Courts-martial ==
=== Adam Holcomb ===
The court-martial of 30-year-old Sgt. Adam Michael Holcomb of Youngstown, Ohio, one of the four charged in Chen's death, began in July 2012. He faced charges including negligent homicide, reckless endangerment, communicating a threat, assault, maltreatment of a subordinate, dereliction of duty, and violating a lawful general regulation, which combined carried a maximum prison sentence of up to 17 years and 9 months. He pleaded not guilty. The trial was conducted at Fort Bragg, North Carolina.

Private Degan Berhe testified that Chen had discussed suicide because of being harassed by Holcomb: "He told me to my face, sir, that he wanted to commit suicide because he was mistreated like a dog."

Holcomb was acquitted of being a cause of Chen's death and most of the other charges, but was convicted of assault. He was sentenced to thirty days in jail, demoted by one rank, and fined $1100 in forfeited pay for this offense.

=== Ryan Offutt ===
In August 2012, it was reported that Spc. Ryan J. Offutt pleaded guilty to one count of hazing and two specifications of maltreatment. Offutt made a plea deal, resulting in charges of negligent homicide and reckless endangerment being dropped. Offutt had called Chen "chink," "gook," "fortune cookie," "squint eye", and "egg roll." He had kicked Chen and mercilessly thrown rocks at him. He was sentenced to six months in prison. On appeal, the Army Court of Criminal Appeals dismissed the six-month sentence and approved punishment only of reducing him in rank to E-1 and discharging him with a Bad Conduct Discharge.

=== Travis Carden ===
In October 2012, it was reported that Spc. Travis Carden was sentenced to ten months in prison, demoted to private and received a Bad Conduct Discharge, after pleading guilty to charges which included attempting to impede an investigation, striking and pushing another soldier, and negligently discharging a pistol in a government van during the altercation. Carden had previously been found guilty of ordering Chen to perform demeaning physical tasks, and calling him racially disparaging names.

=== Andrew J. VanBockel ===
In Afghanistan, VanBockel was Chen's squad leader at Combat Outpost Palace. In November 2012, a military jury convicted Staff Sgt. VanBockel of hazing, dereliction of duty and maltreatment of a subordinate. He was demoted two ranks, reprimanded and forced to perform 60 days of hard labor, of which 45 days were credited due to pre-trial confinement.

== Aftermath ==
The military has been criticized for other deaths of young men associated with hazing, and has conducted courts-martial of fellow military men, including non-coms and officers, who have been seen as permitting or encouraging abusive hazing, against the military's official policies. After the trials associated with Chen's death, the Army said it was working "to re-examine its policies against hazing and, officials said, double its efforts to eradicate the practice from its ranks."

An American Soldier, an opera based on Chen's suicide and the subsequent courts-martial, was premiered at the John F. Kennedy Center for the Performing Arts in 2014. A revised expanded version had its world premiere in 2018 at the Opera Theatre of Saint Louis festival. A New York production of the two-act version ran from 12 to 19 May 2024 at PAC NYC.

=== Congressional Law ===
In May 2026, the Harry Lew and Danny Chen Act was introduced by Senator Judy Chu, Harry Lew's aunt, to address military hazing and abuse "that we must confront directly."

Additionally, as of July 2026, the current Senate version of the FY27 NDAA has a hazing clause that would require Pentagon leadership to consider adding hazing as a standalone offense under the UCMJ.

== Honors ==
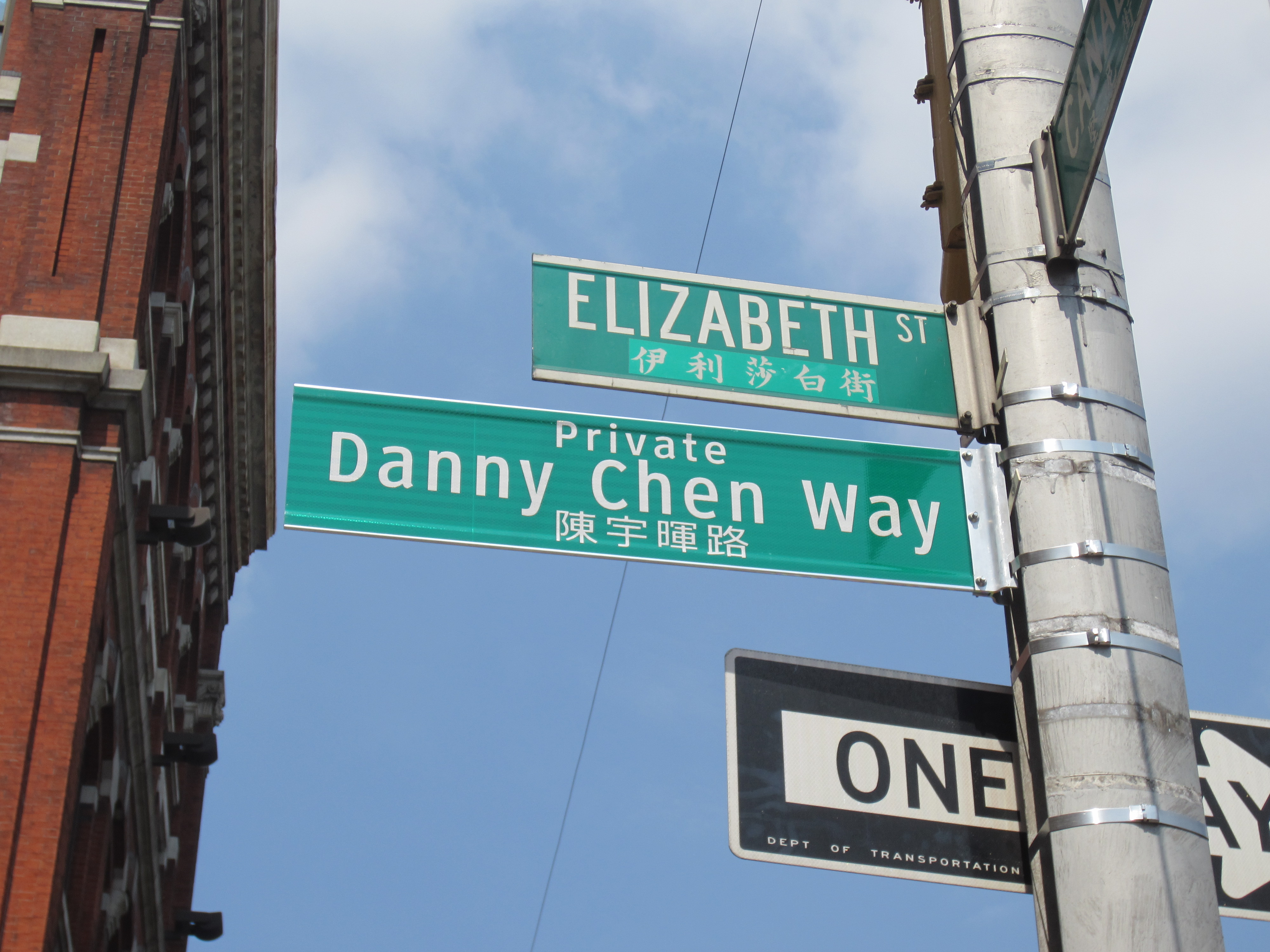
A portion of Manhattan's Elizabeth Street has been designated also as Pvt. Danny Chen Way.

A stretch of Elizabeth Street in Chinatown, Manhattan is now also designated as Private Danny Chen Way. It was dedicated on Memorial Day in 2014.

== See also ==
- Suicide of Harry Lew
- List of hazing deaths in the United States
