= Suicide of Harry Lew =

Hazing-related death of a United States Marine

Lance corporal Harry Lew
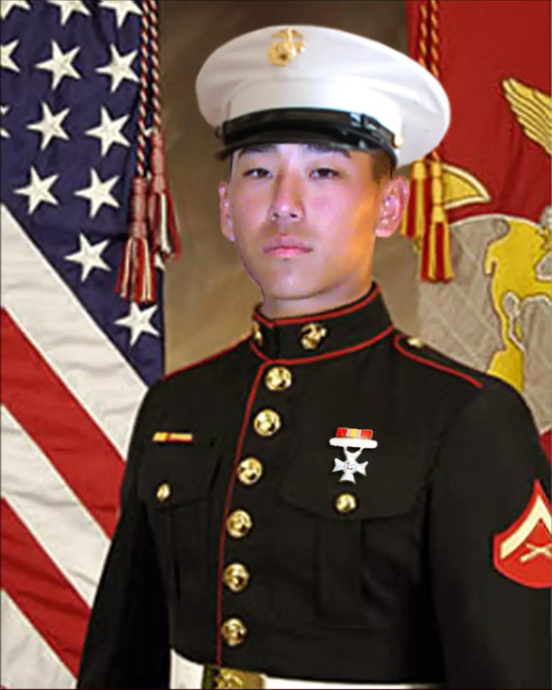
- Born: March 31, 1990; Santa Clara, California, United States
- Died: April 3, 2011 (aged 21); Nawa-I-Barakzayi District, Helmand Province, Afghanistan
- Cause of death: Suicide by gunshot
- Education: Santa Clara High School
- Occupation: U.S. Marine Lance Corporal
- Relatives: Judy Chu (aunt)
Awards

Harry Lew
- Chinese: 廖梓源
Transcriptions
Standard Mandarin
- Hanyu Pinyin: Liào Zǐyuán

Harry Lew (March 31, 1990 – April 3, 2011) was a lance corporal in the United States Marines who committed suicide at Patrol Base Gowragi in Afghanistan, allegedly after being hazed by his fellow marines.

After an investigation, three marines stationed with Lew in Afghanistan, including his sergeant, were charged with hazing. Two were acquitted in courts-martial. The third pled guilty to lesser charges and was sentenced to limited punishment. Lew was a nephew of Congresswoman Judy Chu (D-CA); (Note: Harry Lew's maternal grandmother, Lin Yu'e (林玉娥), was the sister of Judy Chu's mother, Lin Chunmei (林春美), technically making them first cousins once removed, but Lew was generally reported to be a nephew in accordance with Chinese family structure.) she has introduced a bill to prohibit hazing in the military, as the Department of Defense does not track it, and not all services have policies about it.

== Background ==
Harry Lew was born in 1990 in Santa Clara, California, as the second child to Allen Lew (廖厚達) and Sandy Chu (趙美春), both originally from China. Lew did martial arts as a hobby, having taken up tricking in high school and also practising wushu. He graduated from Santa Clara High School in 2008. Before enlisting in the marines, Lew had studied two semesters at Mission College.

== Career ==
Lew enlisted in the Marines in 2009, intending to earn money to pay his college tuition. He completed training at Camp Pendleton near San Diego in February 2010 and was sent to serve in the War in Afghanistan in November 2010 in his first combat deployment.

His unit held Patrol Base Gowragi in Nawa District, Helmand Province, Afghanistan.

== Death ==
On April 3, 2011, three days after his 21st birthday, Lew was found dead of a gunshot wound. He had been on guard duty at Patrol Base Gowragi in Afghanistan. His death was investigated by the Marines and determined to be suicide by gunshot to the head.

=== Investigation ===
Following the investigation, three fellow marines stationed with Lew, including his sergeant, were charged for hazing, which is prohibited in the military. According to the investigation, "he was subjected to a series of physical tasks, had sand dumped on his face, and was mercilessly kicked and punched in the helmet after falling asleep on guard duty for the fourth time at an austere patrol base". They said they were taking "corrective action" because of his mistakes in the combat zone, which could be deadly to other Marines. Congresswoman Chu has noted such physical abuse does not relate to the Marines' stated policy about how plans for corrective actions are to be developed and implemented by Marines in superior rank.

==== Jacob Jacoby ====
Lance Cpl. Jacoby was court-martialed on charges of hazing; the trial was held at the Marine Base at Kaneohe Bay, Hawaii. In testimony, he admitted that he punched and kicked Lance Cpl. Harry Lew at the outpost in Afghanistan. Jacoby's legal case ended on January 30, 2012, when he took a plea deal from prosecutors to lesser charges of assault. He was sentenced to 30 days in jail and reduction of rank.

==== Carlos Orozco III ====
Lance Cpl. Carlos Orozco III was accused of kicking sand in Lew's face and forcing him to do push-ups and leg lifts. LCPL Lew was wearing Orozco's jacket at the time of his death. LCPL Orozco had given the jacket to Lew the week prior. The panel of three officers and five enlisted Marines found Orozco not guilty at a court-martial at Marine Corps Base Hawaii in Kaneohe Bay.

==== Benjamin Johns ====
Sergeant Benjamin Johns was also cleared of hazing charges in the death of Harry Lew.

== Aftermath ==
Following congressional hearings in 2012 in which military officials discussed their efforts to prevent hazing and suicide among military members, which has reached a historic high, Congresswoman Judy Chu and others introduced in May 2012 the "Harry Lew Military Hazing Accountability and Prevention Act". It was passed by the House as part of the National Defense Authorization Act. It is intended to require all services to prohibit hazing, to establish uniform tracking, and focus more on prevention. It was reintroduced into following sessions, as the Senate did not pass it.

Chu had requested that the Government Accountability Office investigate the issue of hazing in the military. It released its report in February 2016, making several recommendations that were incorporated into a revised Harry Lew Act introduced by Chu in 2016. This was passed by the full Congress as S.2943 National Defense Authorization Act for Fiscal Year 2017; it was enacted, and signed by the President on December 23, 2016.

== See also ==
- Suicide of Danny Chen
- List of hazing deaths in the United States
