= Pete Schuermann =

American film director

- Born: Long Island, New York, United States
- Occupation(s): Director, Producer, Writer
- Known for: The Creep Behind the Camera
- Website: http://www.monsterzerocreative.com/, http://peteschuermann.com

Pete Schuermann is a Colorado-based director, producer, editor and cinematographer.

== Career ==
Pete Schuermann began making movies at 19 with the Star Trek parody Hick Trek: The Moovie, which was released to home video in 1999.

In 2005, Walt Disney Studios and Buena Vista Home Entertainment tapped Pete to co-direct and edit Disneyland: Then, Now and Forever, a docu-tainment retrospective piece celebrating Disneyland’s 50th anniversary.

Working with The Gordie Foundation, Schuermann directed Haze, a documentary about Gordie Bailey, who died in 2004 following a hazing incident involving alcohol at the University of Colorado. The film had its world premiere at the 2008 Hamptons International Film Festival and won the Best Documentary Award at the 2009 Indie Spirit Film Festival in Colorado Springs.

Schuermann's next feature-length film was The Creep Behind the Camera, a comedy/drama/documentary hybrid about director Art Nelson and the making of The Creeping Terror, widely considered to be one of the worst movies of all time. In 2014, The Creep Behind the Camera premiered at the Imagine International Film Festival in Amsterdam. The film has received largely negative reviews, with Jay Seaver of eFilmCritic awarding it 2 out of 5 stars, calling the story "disorganized" and the acting "overdone", and Sound On Sight naming it one of the five worst films at the 2014 Fantasia International Film Festival in Montreal.

== Filmography ==
- Hick Trek: The Moovie (1999)
- Star Warp’d (2000)
- Moses 2000 (2000)
- Tell Me Something I Don’t Know (2001)
- Jimmy Hits the Big Town (2003)
- Disneyland: Then, Now, Forever (2005)
- Alice in Wasteland (2005)
- Disneyland: Secrets, Stories, & Magic, co-director (2007)
- Haze (2008)
- Evil Brain from Planet X (2008)
- Conditional (2012)
- The Creep Behind the Camera (2014)
