= Yang Guang (mezzo-soprano) =

Chinese opera singer

Yang Guang (杨光), often referred to in western order as Guang Yang, is a Chinese mezzo-soprano. She won the BBC Cardiff Singer of the World competition in 1997, and the 2001 Operalia Competition. She attended the summer conservatory program of the Music Academy of the West in 2001. She studied at The Juilliard School with Cynthia Hoffmann.
