= Imaginary chair =

Type of exercise

A wall sit

The imaginary chair or wall sit is a means of exercise or punishment, where one positions themselves against a wall as if seated.

A wall sit specifically refers to an exercise done to strengthen the quadriceps muscles. The exercise is characterized by the two right angles formed by the body, one at the hips and one at the knees. The person wall-sitting places their back against a wall with their feet shoulder-width apart and a little ways out from the wall. Then, keeping their back against the wall, they lower their hips until their knees form right angles. This is a very intense workout for the quadriceps muscles, and it can be very painful to hold this position for extended periods. Wall sits are used as a primary strengthening exercise in many sports requiring strong quadriceps including fencing, ice hockey, sailing (mostly small boat racing), skiing and track and field.

== Benefits ==
Wall sitting primarily builds isometric strength and endurance in glutes, calves, quadriceps, hamstrings, and adductor muscles. A study in the British Journal of Sports Medicine of 270 trials found that isometric exercises which involve engaging muscles without movement, such as wall sits and planks, were more effective than other types of exercise for reducing blood pressure. Four repetitions of a two-minute wall sit followed by two minutes' rest, three times per week, was recommended to reduce blood pressure.
