= Death of Andrew Coffey =

Fatal hazing incident at Florida State University

- Date: November 3, 2017
- Location: Florida State University
- Type: Hazing death
- Cause: Acute alcohol poisoning
- Organized by: Pi Kappa Phi
- Deaths: Andrew Coffey
- Accused: Luke Kluttz; Anthony Petagine

Andrew Coffey was killed in November 2017 during a fraternity event, triggering an anti-hazing movement in Florida. On November 3, 2017, Coffey, a Florida State University junior, was killed by acute alcohol poisoning after participating in Big Brother Night, a fraternity event hosted by Pi Kappa Phi. Coffey was found unresponsive on a couch the morning after the event, and his death became part of a national wave of criticism of fraternity hazing practices. Members of the fraternity were eventually prosecuted for their role in Andrew Coffey's death. The majority of Pi Kappa Phi defendants pled guilty to misdemeanor hazing in April 2018. The final two defendants, Luke Kluttz and Anthony Petagine, pled guilty to felony hazing in June 2021 after the Supreme Court of Florida declined to hear their case.

== Death ==
Andrew Coffey, a junior who transferred to FSU to study civil engineering, was a prospective member of Pi Kappa Phi—commonly referred to as a pledge. On November 2, the fraternity was hosting "Big Brother Night" at an off-campus house. Big Brother Night was intended to celebrate pledges becoming mentored by their sponsors, and it was typically a night of heavy drinking for the fraternity. At the time, the fraternity was under a liquor ban, but fraternity members told pledges that the liquor ban was lifted specifically for Big Brother Night. The fraternity's Executive Council arranged for rideshare vehicles to take fraternity members and pledges from the fraternity house to an off-campus location.

At some point during the party, Coffey was given a bottle of Wild Turkey 101 bourbon and was coerced into drinking it all, in a tradition known as "the family bottle". Court records said that while pledges were not physically forced into drinking, "it is clear the environment created by the leaders and fraternity members led to an expectation of abusive drinking or the pledges would face ostracism by the group." He drank enough that he passed out.

In the morning, another pledge found Coffey was unresponsive. Before calling 911, he called and texted fraternity members, creating an 11-minute delay between Coffey's discovery and an eventual call for help. An autopsy revealed that Coffey had a blood alcohol level of 0.447, or over 5 times the legal limit for driving. At the time of his death, his BAC might have reached as high as 0.558, or about 7 times the legal limit.

During the 911 call, someone can be heard saying "We had a party last night and my friend passed out on the couch on his side and his lips are purple. His body is extremely stiff and I can't wake him up, and, honestly, I don't feel a pulse." Fraternity members reportedly didn't know the address of the house or the nearest intersection. Most of the audio tape of the 911 call has the dispatcher leading the caller through chest compressions.

=== Criminal prosecution ===
CNN reported that law enforcement was frustrated by the general lack of cooperation with the investigation among fraternity members. Of the 9 fraternity leaders, 7 refused to speak, and 19 pledges refused to speak to law enforcement as well. The grand jury presentment alleged that those who did speak to the police were reciting a pre-rehearsed script that offered mostly self-serving information.

Regardless, the grand jury found the evidence worthy of indictment. On January 17, 2018, nine fraternity members from Pi Kappa Phi were arrested and charged with hazing causing injury or death, which is a third-degree felony in Florida under the Chad Meredith Act. 5 of the defendants pled guilty to 2 counts of misdemeanor hazing, and 4 of them spent 60 days in jail. One of the defendants, Connor Ravelo, was sentenced to 30 days in jail, 20 of which he had previously served. Ravelo was the only one called to testify before the grand jury. According to court records, he was the one who bought the Wild Turkey bottle that Coffey was coerced into drinking. He was underage when he purchased it with a fake ID. Investigators said there were, in total, 21 underage drinkers at Big Brother Night who were encouraged to drink to excess.

Three of the men charged with felony hazing pled not guilty. A judge initially dismissed the felony case against the three men after defense lawyers argued that the charges under Florida's hazing statute were "too vague," but it was overturned in the First District Court of Appeals. The First District ruling established that individuals who organize or oversee the use of hazing can be charged under Florida's anti-hazing statute, regardless of whether they were physically present.

The Supreme Court of Florida declined to hear the defendants' case, and the last two defendants in the Coffey hazing death investigation pled guilty to felony hazing in June 2021.

== Civil trial ==
The Coffey family filed a civil suit against the nine men who were charged with Andrew Coffey's death, the national Pi Kappa Phi fraternity organization, the chapter's former adviser, and others. With the exception of Ravelo, all fraternity members named in the lawsuit were part of the Executive Council that arranged the party. The lawsuit also includes the two people who rented the off-campus home to the fraternity. In the suit, the Coffeys alleged that the national office for Pi Kappa Phi, through action and inaction, perpetuated a culture of abuse and hazing at the FSU chapter.

“The universities can only do so much, but when the national fraternities know these dangerous, illegal traditions are taking place and they turn a blind eye, they’re as guilty as anybody else because they are expecting the tradition to continue,” said David W. Bianchi, the family's lawyer. Bianchi helped draft the Chad Meredith Act after the 2001 hazing death of Chad Meredith at the University of Miami.

In June 2018, virtually everyone named in the lawsuit settled with the Coffey family for an undisclosed amount.

=== Changes at FSU ===
Immediately after the news of Coffey's death, FSU President John Thrasher suspended all Greek life on campus and banned alcohol at all student organization events. At the time, FSU was home to 55 fraternities and sororities and more than 700 student organizations. Thrasher partially lifted the Greek life suspension on January 29, 2018, allowing sororities and fraternities to participate in philanthropic events and to recruit new members. FSU lifted the alcohol ban in March 2018. However, the FSU chapter of Pi Kappa Phi was permanently closed by the national office in response to Coffey's death.

In the wake of the Andrew Coffey incident, the university drafted new alcohol policies. In order to serve alcohol at social events, organizers are now required to go through risk management training.

== The formation of PUSH ==
A string of high-profile hazing deaths in the years surrounding Coffey's death, including the death of Tim Piazza at Penn State, reignited the anti-hazing movement. Reporters noted that this is the first gathering of parents of students killed in hazing incidents who have come together to push for new legislation. The Coffeys joined more than a dozen families to form PUSH (Parents United to Stop Hazing). PUSH is part of a nationwide effort to end hazing practices on college campuses. The Coffeys and the rest of PUSH's members want lawmakers to create a nationwide anti-hazing law that makes hazing a federal crime. David W. Bianchi and Michael E. Levine, the Coffey family attorneys, have drafted amendments to Florida's anti-hazing statute to make it tougher and to provide immunity for the first person who calls 911 to report a medical emergency resulting from a hazing incident. That legislative effort passed the Florida House and Senate with unanimous votes, and was signed into law on June 25, 2019.
