= De Molay =

De Molay could refer to:

- Jacques de Molay, the last Grand Master of the Knights Templars
- DeMolay International, Masonic youth organization for males.
