= Theta Alpha =

American college fraternity (1909–1933)

- ΘΑ
- Founded: February 22, 1909; 117 years ago Syracuse University
- Type: Social
- Affiliation: Independent
- Status: Merged
- Merge date: 1933
- Successor: Delta Sigma Lambda
- Emphasis: Freemasonry
- Scope: National
- Chapters: 5
- Members: 585 lifetime
- Headquarters: Syracuse, New York; United States

Theta Alpha (ΘΑ) was an American social fraternity based on the principles of the Order of DeMolay, a Masonic organization for boys. It was founded in 1909 and merged into Delta Sigma Lambda in 1933.

== History ==
Theta Alpha was founded on February 22, 1909 at Syracuse University. It expanded to Cornell University in 1915 and the University of Illinois in 1922. In 1925, it added two more chapters at the University of Southern California and the University of California, Berkeley.

By 1930, Theta Alpha had initiated 535 members and had four active chapters. Its chapters at Syracuse, Cornell, and Illinois had chapter houses.

The reduction of student enrollment and tightened budgets during the depths of the Great Depression hit all fraternities hard. By 1933, three of the fraternity's five chapters were inactive. In September 1933, Theta Alpha merged into Delta Sigma Lambda, a national fraternity formed of members of the Order of DeMolay. At the time of the merger, Theta Alpha had initiated 585 members.

In 1937 when Delta Sigma Lambda went defunct, the former Alpha chapter of Theta Alpha reverted to a local fraternity called Pi Alpha Chi. In 1947 it again took the name Theta Alpha, operating under than name until 1963 when it became a chapter of Tau Kappa Epsilon.

== Symbols ==
Theta Alpha fraternity published a periodical called Theta Alpha.

== Chapters ==
Following is a list of Theta Alpha chapters, with inactive chapters in italics.

Name	Charter date and range	Institution	Location	Status	Ref.
Alpha	February 22, 1909 – 1933	Syracuse University	Syracuse, New York	Merged (ΔΣΛ)	(Note: Chapter became a chapter of Delta Sigma Lambda with the national merger of the two fraternities. When Delta Sigma Lambda failed, the chapter reverted to local status, naming itself Pi Alpha Chi. In 1947, it again took the name Theta Alpha, and in 1963 became Iota-Zeta chapter of Tau Kappa Epsilon.)
Beta	1915–1933	Cornell University	Ithaca, New York	Merged (ΔΣΛ)	(Note: Chapter formed from Omicron Sigma Omicron (local). In 1933. it became the Lambda chapter of Delta Sigma Lambda. When its new fraternity went defunct in 1937, the chapter withdrew and became a local fraternity called Theta Alpha.)
Gamma	1922–1933	University of Illinois	Urbana, Illinois	Inactive	(Note: Chapter formed from Al Ikhwan (local), established in 1919.)
Delta	1925–1933	University of Southern California	Los Angeles, California	Inactive	
Epsilon	1925–c. 1930	University of California	Berkeley, California	Inactive	
