= Delta Sigma Lambda =

Defunct American collegiate fraternity

- ΔΣΛ
- Founded: September 9, 1921; 105 years ago University of California, Berkeley
- Type: Social
- Former affiliation: NIC
- Status: Merged
- Merge date: 1937
- Successor: Theta Chi
- Emphasis: Order of DeMolay
- Scope: National
- Colors: Blue and Gold
- Chapters: 12
- Members: 900+ lifetime
- Headquarters: Chicago, Illinois; United States

Delta Sigma Lambda (ΔΣΛ) was a social fraternity founded on September 9, 1921, formed entirely of members of the Order of DeMolay. It continued for about fifteen years, numbering twelve chapters in its rolls, with several closing in the early years of the Great Depression. Delta Sigma Lambda's remaining chapters either disbanded or were absorbed by other fraternities by 1937.

== History ==
Delta Sigma Lambda was established on September 9, 1921, at the University of California, Berkeley. Its founders were Albert A. Axelrod, Edgar S. Bissinger, Joshua Eppinger Jr., Joshua S. Fairchild, A. Donald McLean and H. P. Meyer—all members of the Order of DeMolay. Their goal was to create a fraternity that would strengthen the bonds formed in the Order of DeMolay, a Masonic organization for boys.

Students at the University of Nevada heard about Delta Sigma Lambda and established Delta Sigma Lambda in 1922. It became the second chapter of Delta Sigma Lambda in 1923, creating a national fraternity. The fraternity was not associated with the Order of De Molay, but its members all belonged to the order. It established its headquarters in San Francisco, California, with McLean serving as Delta Sigma Lambda's first grand president.

In the meantime, several independent collegiate fraternities formed based on the principles of the Order of DeMolay between 1921 and 1924. On December 23, 1924, representative from six of these fraternities met in Lawrence, Kansas to discuss combining into a national fraternity. Those represented were:

- Delta Sigma Lambda: University of California, Berkeley
- Delta Sigma Lambda: University of Arizona
- Star and Crescent: Purdue University
- Scimitar Club: University of Kansas
- Delta Kappa Fraternity and Illinois DeMolay Club: University of Illinois Urbana-Champaign
- Delta Lambda: University of Nebraska

By December 25, 1925, the consolidation was finalized as Delta Sigma Lambda, in recognition of it being the oldest and largest group. In 1927, Delta Sigma Lambda become a junior member of the National Interfraternity Conference. Its national headquarters were moved to Chicago in October 1927. By 1930, it had alumni chapters in Chicago and San Francisco, seven active chapters, and 850 members.

Delta Sigma Lambda would eventually install twelve chapters,, but most by adoption of local chapters around the United States. The reduction of student enrollment and tightened budgets during the depths of the Great Depression hit all fraternities hard. In September 1933, a smaller, regional fraternity named Theta Alpha, founded on February 22, 1909, merged into Delta Sigma Lambda. Earlier that year, three of Theta Alpha's five chapters had gone Inactive. The surviving chapters at Syracuse and Cornell accepted a merger, with Syracuse being the stronger organization of the two.

Later that year, the Grand Council of the Order of DeMolay recognized Delta Sigma Lambda as "the national college Fraternity for DeMolays", but Baird's Manual of American College Fraternities (20th edition) notes that this "may have easily proved a handicap".

This infusion was not enough to save the fraternity, grappling with the depths of the Great Depression. Over the next four years, by 1937, many of the chapters had died. Theta Chi in 1937 agreed to absorb the chapters at Purdue University and the University of Montana, and later, the University of Arizona, along with fraternity alumni. Scattered alumni and some of Delta Sigma Lambda's chapters either withdrew to join other national fraternities or went local.

== Symbols ==
Delta Sigma Lambda's coat of arms included a shield divided into three sections. In its upper right corner were three stars. Its center featured a fasces or a bunch of wooden rods. In the lower left section was a chain. Above the shield was a reclining lion. Below the shield was a scroll with the fraternity's name.

The fraternity's badge was a jeweled shield with the Greek letters ΔΣΛ, a crescent, and a star, on top of a while gold Maltese cross. After the merger with Theta Alpha, the Greek letters ΘΑ where added at the bottom of the shield. Its pledge pin was a white crescent. The fraternity's flower was the trillium. Its colors were blue and gold.

== Governance ==
Delta Lambda Sigma was governed by a biennial convention where delegates from the various chapters elected a board of governors and national officers. The officers consisted of a grand president and a grand secretary who were housed at the national headquarters in Chicago.

== Chapters ==
Following is a list of Delta Sigma Lambdachapters, with inactive chapters in italics.

Chapter	Charter date and range	Institution	Location	Status	Ref.
Alpha	September 9, 1921 – 1932	University of California, Berkeley	Berkeley, California	Inactive	
Gamma	1923–1935	University of Nevada	Reno, Nevada	Inactive	(Note: Chapter formed from Delta Sigma Lambda (local), established in 1922.)
Beta	December 25, 1925 – 1935	University of Kansas	Lawrence, Kansas	Inactive	(Note: Chapter formed from the Scimiter Club (local), established in 1923.)
Epsilon	December 25, 1925 – 1936	University of Nebraska	Lincoln, Nebraska	Withdrew (ΦΓΔ)	(Note: Chapter formed from Delta Lambda (local), established in 1924. In 1936, it withdrew and merged with the existing Lambda Nu chapter of Phi Gamma Delta.)
Zeta	December 25, 1925 – 1937	Purdue University	West Lafayette, Indiana	Merged (ΘΧ)	(Note: Chapter formed from the Star and Crescent Club (local), established in 1922. In 1937, it merged with the existing Alpha Delta chapter of Theta Chi.)
Eta	December 25, 1925 – 1937	University of Illinois	Urbana, Illinois	Inactive	(Note: Chapter formed from Delta Kappa (local), established in 1923.)
Theta	1927 – March 27, 1937	University of Montana	Missoula, Montana	Merged (ΘΧ)	(Note: Chapter formed from 1924 as the Templar Club (local), established in 1924. It became the Beta Epsilon chapter of Theta Chi on March 27, 1937.)
Delta	1930–1941	University of Arizona	Tucson, Arizona	Merged (ΘΧ)	(Note: Chapter formed from the Square & Compass Club (local), established in 1912. It became the Beta Iota chapter of Theta Chi in 1941.)
Iota	1931–1935	Carnegie Mellon University	Pittsburgh, Pennsylvania	Inactive	(Note: Chapter formed from Phi Delta Tau (local), established in 1930.)
Kappa	1931–1936	Rensselaer Polytechnic Institute	Troy, New York	Withdrew (ΛΧΑ)	(Note: This chapter originated in 1924 as the DeMolay Club, becoming itself Delta Mu (local) in 1928. It became the Epsilon-Eta chapter of Lambda Chi Alpha in 1937.)
Alpha Theta	1933–1936	Syracuse University	Syracuse, New York	Withdrew (local)	(Note: Chapter formed from the Alpha chapter of Theta Alpha, established in 1909. When Delta Sigma Lambda merged with Theta Chi, this chapter withdrew and became a local fraternity called Pi Alpha Chi. In 1947, it again took the name Theta Alpha, and in 1963 became Iota-Zeta chapter of Tau Kappa Epsilon.)
Lambda	1933–1936	Cornell University	Ithaca, New York	Withdrew (local)	(Note: Chapter formed from the Beta chapter of Theta Alpha with the national merger of the two fraternities. When Delta Sigma Lambda merged with Theta Chi, the chapter withdrew and became a local fraternity called Theta Alpha.)
