= Flavinha =

Brazilian politician (born 1990)

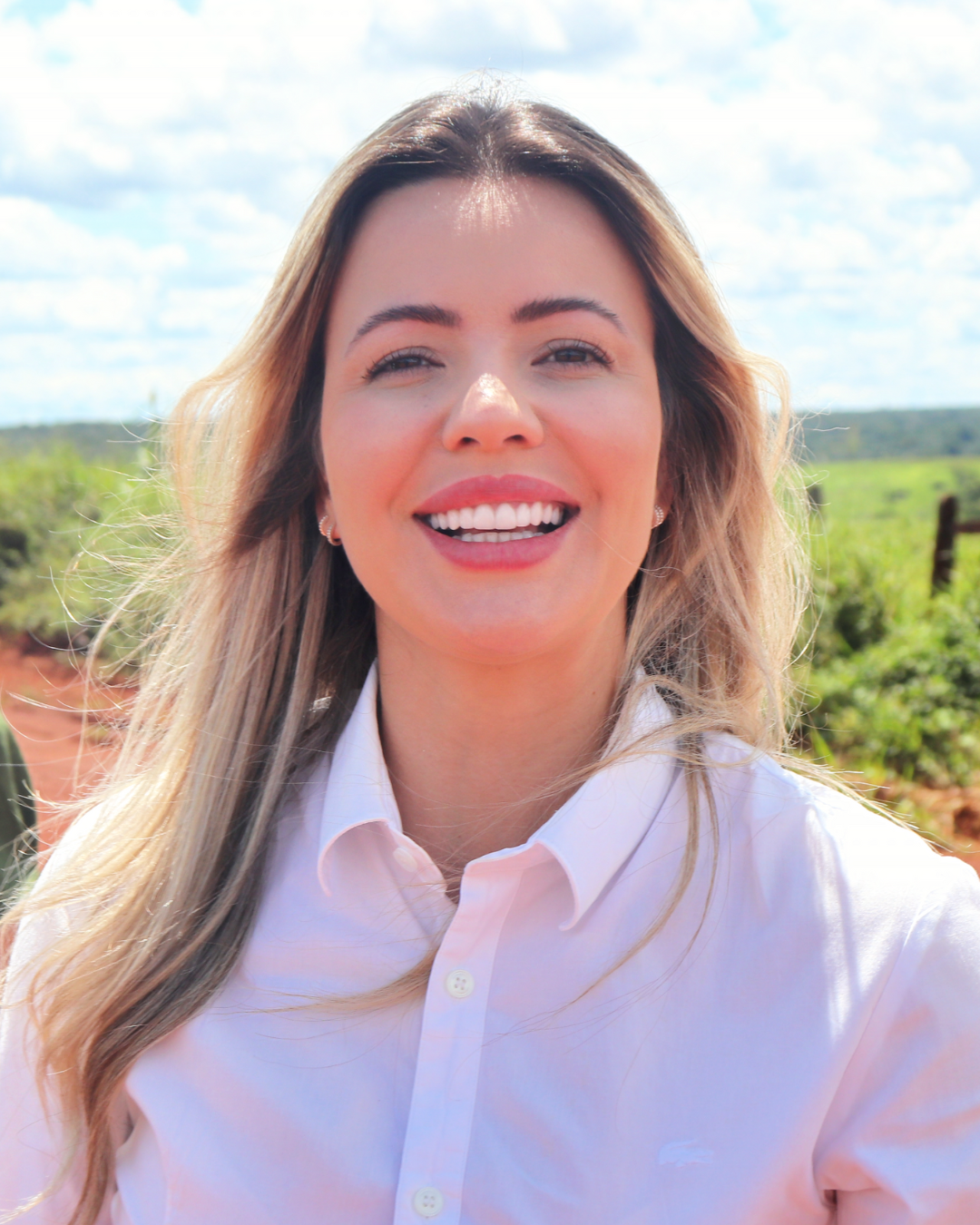
- Flavinha in 2025

Member of the Chamber of Deputies
- In office 30 May 2023 – 29 September 2023
- Preceded by: Juarez Costa
- Succeeded by: Juarez Costa
- Constituency: Mato Grosso

Personal details
- Born: 8 November 1990 (age 35)
- Party: Social Democratic Party (since 2025)

Ana Flávia Rodrigues Ramiro (born 8 November 1990), better known as Flavinha, is a Brazilian politician. From May to September 2023, she was a member of the Chamber of Deputies. In the 2024 municipal elections, she was a candidate for mayor of Colíder.
