= Godfrey of Amiens =

French Roman Catholic abbot, bishop of Amiens and saint

Saint Godfrey of Amiens
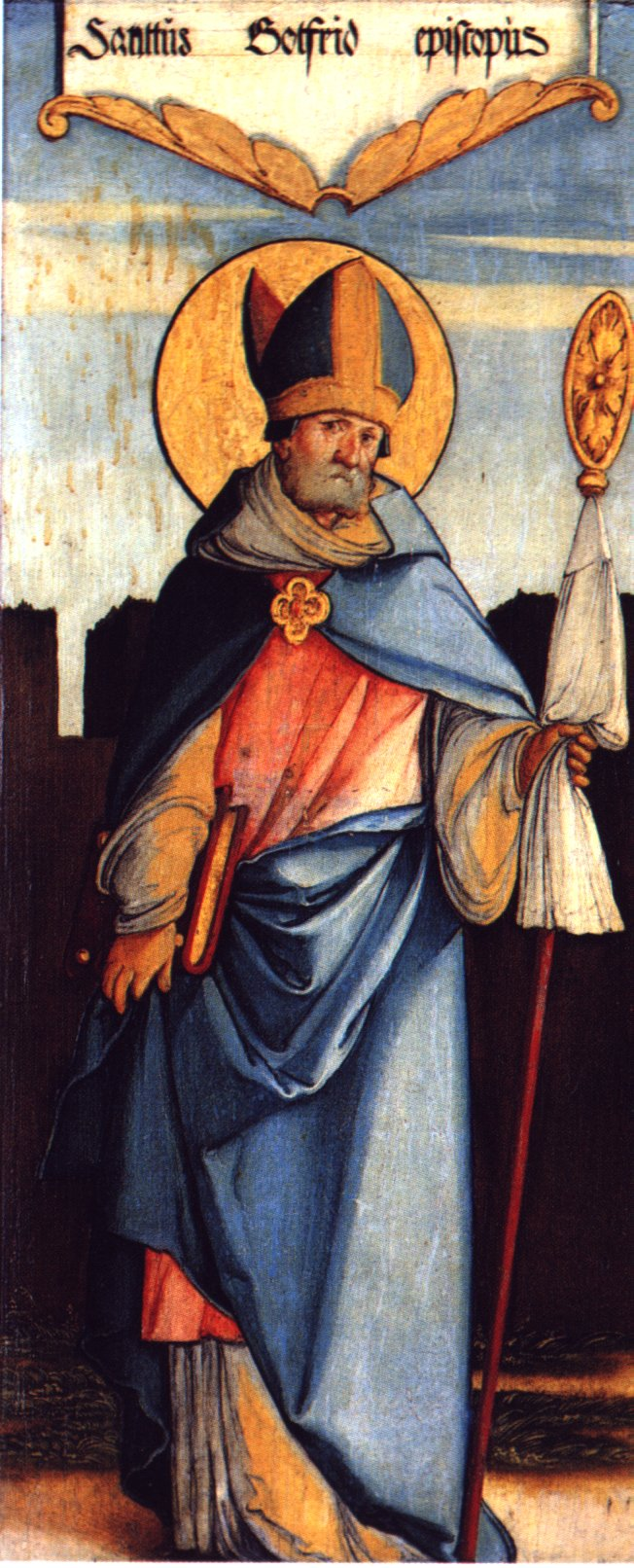
- Godfrey of Amiens

Bishop of Amiens
- Born: 1066; Soissons, France
- Died: November 8, 1115; Soissons, France
- Venerated in: Roman Catholic Church
- Feast: 8 November

Godfrey of Amiens (French: Geoffroy d'Amiens) (1066–1115) was a bishop of Amiens. He is a saint in the Catholic Church.

== Life ==
Godfrey was born in 1066 in Moulincourt as the third child of a noble family, in the Diocese of Soissons. When his mother died, his father Frodon decided to take up the monastic life. At the age of five, Godfrey was taken by his uncle, the Bishop of Soissons, who sent him to be educated in the Benedictine abbey of Mont-Saint-Quentin, where his godfather Godefroid was abbot. While at Saint Quentin, Godfrey was given charge of the sick, and appointed hospitaller, to receive the poor at the gate.

At the age of 25, he was ordained priest by the Bishop of Noyon and became the abbot of the Abbey of Nogent-sous-Coucy, Champagne in 1096. When he arrived, the place was overrun by weeds, but he rebuilt it, establishing a hostel for pilgrims.

He declined both the abbacy of Saint-Remi and the bishopric of Reims, before being compelled to accept the office of bishop of Amiens. King Philip and the Council of Troyes chose Godfrey in part because he was skilled in business affairs. Godfrey was noted for imposing a rigid austerity on himself and those around him. He enforced clerical celibacy, and his opposition to drunkenness and simony led to an attempt on his life. Godfrey wished to retire to Grande Chartreuse to maintain a life of penitence, and in 1114 moved to a monastery. However, in 1115, he was called back to his post.

He fell sick and took refuge in the abbey of Saint Crépin in Soissons, where he died on November 8, 1115.

== Veneration ==
- Godfrey of Amiens is remembered on November 8.
- A street in Amiens is named after him.

== Sources ==
- (fr) Essai sur Saint Geoffroy, évêque d'Amiens - Guérard - 1843
- (fr) Histoire de la ville d'Amiens depuis les gaulois jusqu'à nos jours - R.de Hyacinthe Dusevel - 1848 - Amiens (France) - Page 259 - (Gallica)
- (fr) Le livre des saints et des prénoms - Alain Guillermou - 1976 - Page 146
