= Peggy Vaughan =

American author

- Born: 1936
- Died: November 8, 2012 (aged 75–76); La Jolla, California, U.S.
- Occupations: Author, Speaker
- Known for: Expertise on infidelity issues
- Spouse: James Vaughan

Peggy Vaughan (1936 – November 8, 2012) was an American author and speaker on infidelity issues.

Vaughan became known in 1980 when she and her husband, James Vaughan, shared their story of overcoming infidelity on the Phil Donahue Show

Over the next 30 years, Vaughan became known "as an internationally recognized expert in the area of extramarital affairs." Public reaction led Vaughan to create the Beyond Affairs Network "to help others whose marriages were impacted by infidelity."

In 1989, Vaughan published The Monogamy Myth, which challenged prevailing attitudes and assumptions about extramarital affairs with the goal of "helping people be better prepared to either prevent affairs or to recover if it happens." A follow-up edition of this book was published in 2003 with the subtitle "A Personal Handbook for Recovering from Affairs."

In 1991, Vaughan and her husband began conducting public seminars on "recovering from affairs," later organizing the handouts from those seminars into a handbook for couples. In 1992, the Vaughans wrote Making Love Stay, which shared their insights about long-term relationships.

In a 1999 keynote at the Smart Marriages conference, Vaughan shared her perspective on rebuilding marriage after an affair:

- Answer all questions and hang in through the inevitable emotional turmoil.
- Sever contact with the third party and build trust through actions, not promises.
- Make a commitment to honesty and ongoing honest communication.
- Accept the fact that monogamy is an issue that's never settled "once and for all."

After a four-year battle with cancer, Vaughan died at her home in La Jolla, California on November 8, 2012. Upon her death, many of her writings were donated to the public.

== Bibliography ==
- Vaughan, Peggy (2003). The Monogamy Myth: A Personal Handbook for Recovering from Affairs. New York, NY: William Morrow. ISBN 1557045429.
- Vaughan, Peggy (2008). Lifedesign: Living Your Life By Choice Instead Of Chance. New York, NY: Dialog Press. p. 124. ISBN 978-0936390222.
- Vaughan, Peggy (2008). To Have and To Hold. New York, NY: William Morrow. p. 208. ISBN 978-1557048516.
- Vaughan, Peggy (2008). Musings on Life. New York, NY: Dialog Press. p. 248. ISBN 978-0936390239.
- Vaughan, Peggy (2009). Making Love Stay: Everything You Ever Knew About Love But Forgot. New York, NY: Dialog Press. p. 242. ISBN 978-0936390277.
- Vaughan, Peggy (2010). Help for Therapists (and their Clients) in dealing with affairs. New York, NY: Dialog Press. p. 162. ISBN 978-0936390208.
- Vaughan, Peggy (2010). Beyond Affairs. New York, NY: Dialog Press. p. 252. ISBN 978-0936390185.
- Vaughan, Peggy (2010). Dear Peggy: Peggy Vaughan answers questions about extramarital affairs. New York, NY: Dialog Press. p. 330. ISBN 978-0936390291.
