= Frank S. Land =

American businessman

Frank Sherman Land
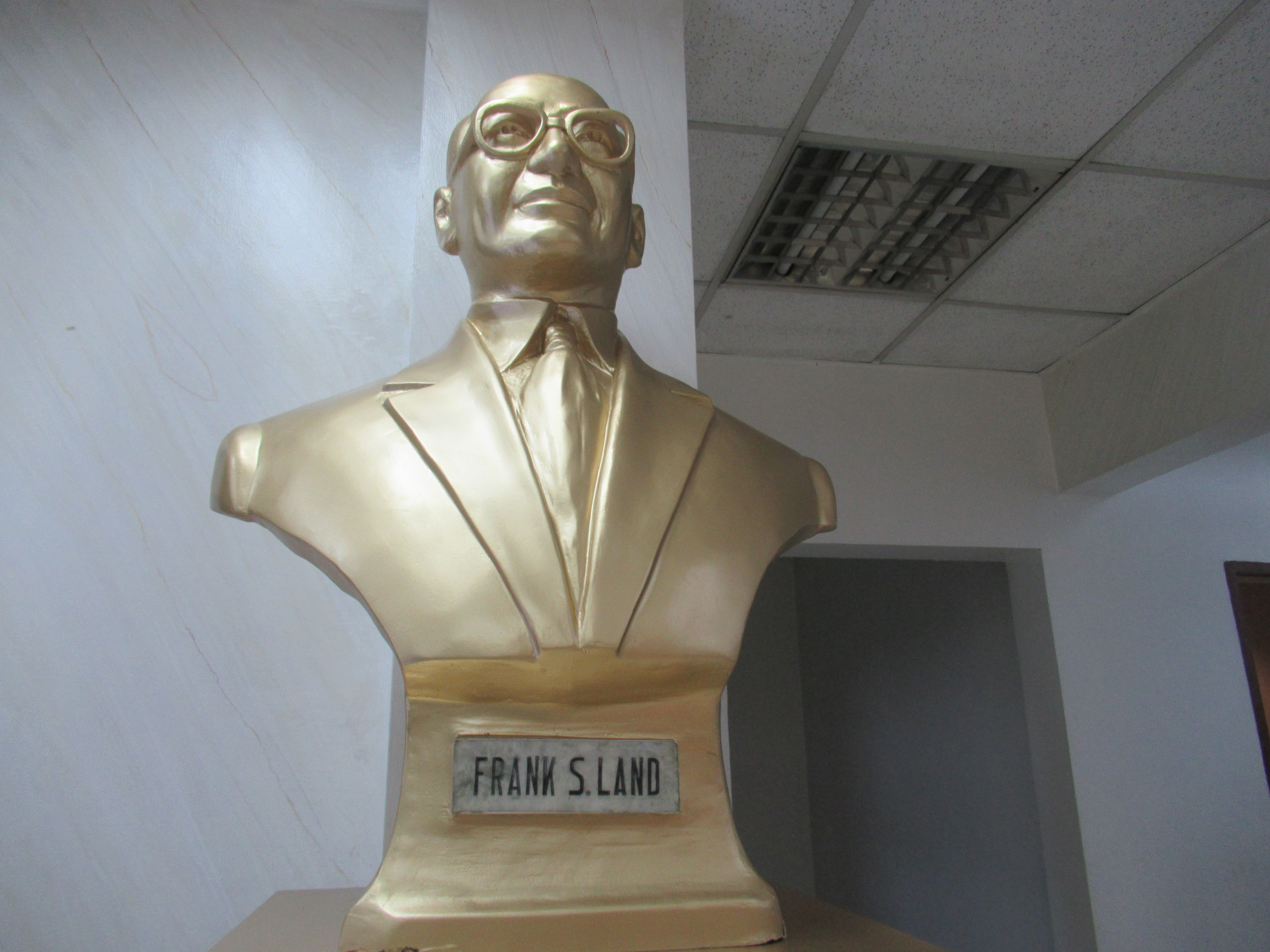
- Bust of Frank S. Land inside the Philippine DeMolay Youth Center in Manila, Philippines
- Born: June 21, 1890; Kansas City, Missouri, US
- Died: November 8, 1959 (aged 69)
- Known for: Founder of the Order of DeMolay

Frank Sherman "Dad" Land (June 21, 1890 – November 8, 1959) was the Founder of the Order of DeMolay. A business and community leader in Kansas City and a member of Ivanhoe Lodge No. 446, Land served as Imperial Potentate of the Shriners and is revered today as the Founder of the Order of DeMolay.

== Biography ==
Frank S. Land was born in Kansas City, Missouri. He gained a reputation as the "Boy Preacher” in his youth, at his Sunday school at Fountain Park Congregational Church Sunday School. He attended the Kansas City Art Institute. At age 21 he was elected president of the Municipal Art Club in Kansas City. He became a member of the Ivanhoe Lodge #446 in Kansas City on June 29, 1912, where he became the Secretary of the Social Service Bureau of the Scottish Rite Bodies. Frank Land married Nell M. Swiezewski on September 15, 1913, at Budd Park Christian Church, with Sumner N. Blossom as his best man. Land died on November 8, 1959; his body is interred at Mount Moriah Cemetery in Kansas City, Missouri.

== Founding of DeMolay ==
Land was selected to act as the director of the Masonic Relief and Employment Bureau of the Scottish Rite of Freemasonry. This charity would come to help hundreds of families.

A community leader who, at the age of 28, already had a successful business career as a restaurateur behind him, Land met Louis G. Lower in January 1919. Lower was a sixteen-year-old boy who had recently lost his father, Elmer Lower, a member of Ivanhoe Lodge. Frank S. Land gave up his social service job with the Scottish Rite and became full-time Secretary General in the headquarters of the DeMolay organization in 1922. Lower came to be the director of the Municipal Auditorium (Kansas City).

== Honors and awards ==
Land was a past Potentate of Ararat Shrine Temple and served as Imperial Potentate of the Shrine in 1954-55. He was honored with the Knight Commander of the Court of Honor of the Scottish Rite and coroneted a 33° in 1925. He was named an honorary member of the University of Missouri chapter of Acacia fraternity. He received the first International Gold Service Medal of the General Grand Chapter of York Rite Masons in 1951 for work in Humanities. He received the Grand Cross of the Southern Jurisdiction of the Supreme Council of Scottish Rite 33° in 1955. He was the president of the Kansas City School Board, a Director of the Columbia National Bank, and a trustee of the Harry S. Truman Presidential Library and Museum at the time of his death.

== Legacy ==
Today, every member of DeMolay International learns about Land through the book Hi, Dad! and chapter activities. Recipients of the Degree of Chevalier take a vow to honor Land's memory every year on November 8 by breaking bread with a fellow Chevalier, an active DeMolay, or a young man in his teens. DeMolay International also endows a scholarship in Land's name.
