= DeMolay International =

International youth fraternity patterned after the Freemasons

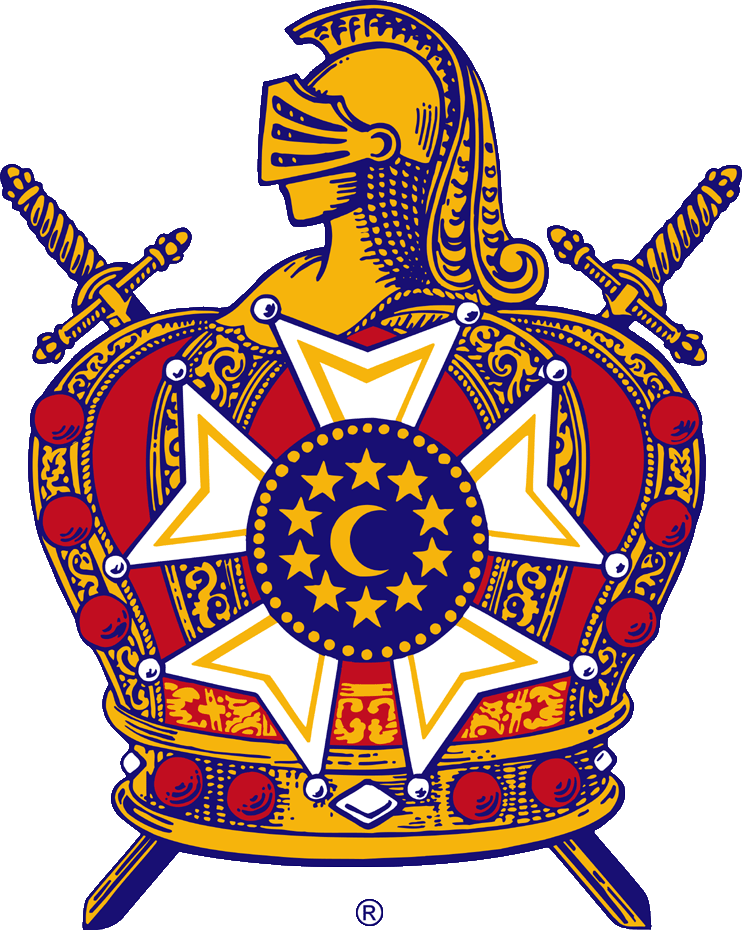
- Heraldic badge of the fraternity

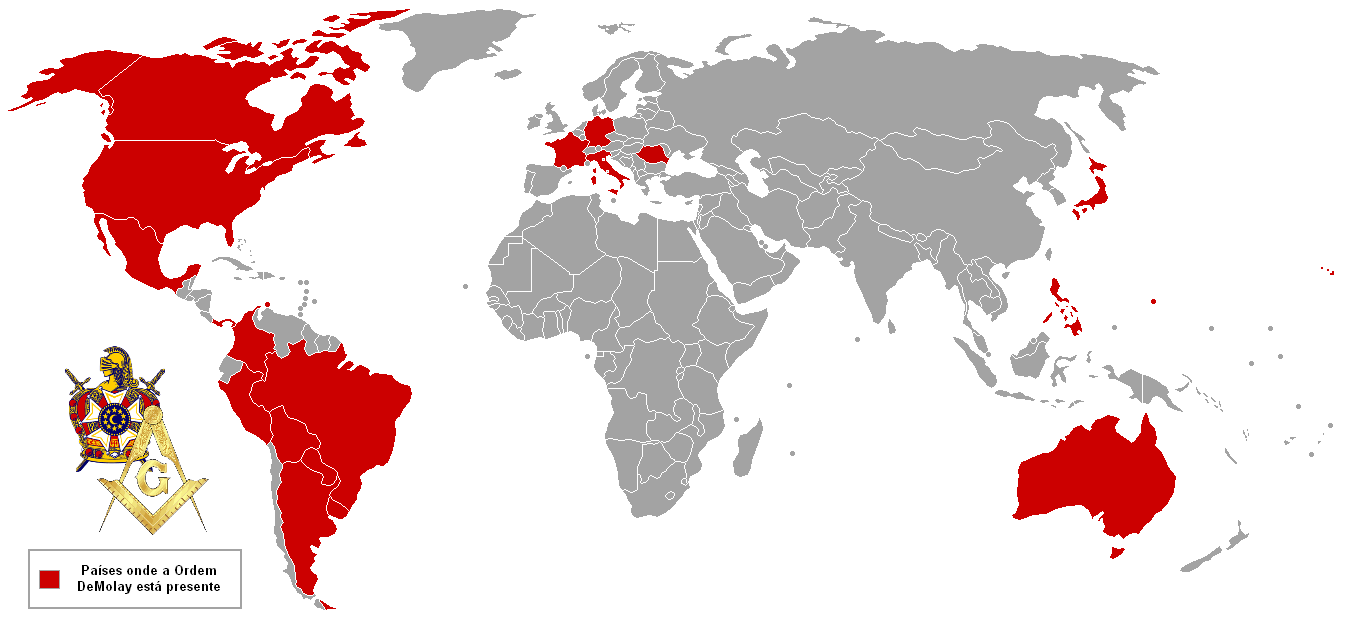
- Countries with active chapters
- Named after: Jacques de Molay
- Formation: March 24, 1919; 107 years ago
- Founder: Frank Sherman Land
- Founded at: Kansas City, Missouri
- Type: Sect
- Location: 10200 NW Ambassador Drive, Kansas City, MO 64153
- Coordinates: 39.2784°N 94.6713°W
- Region served: Albania; Aruba; Argentina; Bolivia; Bulgaria; Brazil; Canada; Ecuador; France; Germany; Italy; Japan; Mexico; Panama; Paraguay; Peru; Philippines; Romania; Serbia; Uruguay; United States
- Members: 15,887 (2019)
- Volunteers: > 4 million worldwide
- Website: demolay.org

DeMolay International is a youth leadership organization with Masonic origins for young men ages 12 to 21. There is in select areas a "Squire" program for those younger than 12. It was founded in Kansas City, Missouri, in 1919 and named for Jacques de Molay, the last Grand Master of the Knights Templar. DeMolay was incorporated in the 1990s and is classified by the IRS as a tax-exempt 501(c)(3) organization.

DeMolay is open for membership to young men between the ages of 12 and 21 who acknowledge a higher spiritual power. It has about 12,000 active members spread throughout every continent except for Antarctica. There are active chapters in Canada, Germany, Australia, Japan, the Philippines, Argentina, Aruba, French Guiana, Uruguay, Paraguay, Peru, Bolivia, Brazil, Ecuador (affiliated to Peru jurisdiction), Italy, Romania, Greece (affiliated to Romania jurisdiction), France, Albania, Montenegro, Serbia, Bosnia (affiliated to Serbia jurisdiction), Bulgaria and the United States.

Although young women are not permitted to join the organization, chapters are permitted to elect chapter "sweethearts" and "princesses."

While DeMolay is a youth organization for young men, the Rainbow Girls and Job's Daughters are similar Masonic-related organizations for young women.

== Founding ==
The Order of DeMolay was founded in 1919 with nine members, most of whom lived near each other in Kansas City.

The crown appearing in the emblem of the order contains 10 rubies, each representing one of the original nine members and the organization's founder, Frank S. Land. Frank S. Land was a member of Ivanhoe Lodge No. 446. The rubies were originally portrayed as pearls; as each founding member died, the pearl representing him was changed to a ruby.

== Values ==
DeMolay has seven Cardinal Virtues, taught as its basic ideals. The Order calls for every member to live according to these Virtues, which are considered as the things that distinguish a good leader and a good man. They are:

- Filial love: the love and the kindness we should have with our parents, the ones that gave us birth and taught us the first lessons of kindness, respect and belief in God.
- Reverence for sacred things: a belief in a supreme being (independent of a specific religion) and respect for others' beliefs.
- Courtesy: kindness, respect, and philanthropy
- Comradeship: being a faithful friend, not only in good times but also in hard times.
- Fidelity: the strength to follow one's own values and virtues, and to keep secret everything which is entrusted to one; faithfulness to God, one's homeland, and one's friends, as Jacques DeMolay preferred to die rather than betray his companions or break with his pledge.
- Cleanliness: purity in soul and heart, and a clear conscience, keeping your mind away from everything that is against the values of a good citizen.
- Patriotism: respect for, and the willingness to defend, our homeland, our democracy, our state and our city, including the preservation of public spaces and places, such as schools, asylums, orphanages and hospitals, that support people in need.

DeMolay defends three fundamental freedoms:

- Religious Freedom: represented by any holy book, independent of the religion
- Civil Freedom: represented by the national flag
- Intellectual Freedom: represented by the Scholar Books

DeMolay has an Ethical Code, composed of the following statements:

- A DeMolay serves God.
- A DeMolay honors all womanhood.
- A DeMolay loves and honors his parents.
- A DeMolay is honest.
- A DeMolay is loyal to ideals and friends.
- A DeMolay practices honest toil.
- A DeMolay's word is as good as his bond.
- A DeMolay is courteous.
- A DeMolay is at all times a gentleman.
- A DeMolay is a patriot in peace as well as war.
- A DeMolay is clean in mind and body.
- A DeMolay stands unswervingly for the public schools.
- A DeMolay always bears the reputation of a good and law-abiding citizen.
- A DeMolay by precept and example must preserve the high standards to which he has pledged himself.

The organization's motto is "No DeMolay shall fail as a citizen, as a leader and as a man."

== Organizational structure ==
A local DeMolay body is known as a Chapter and is headed by the Master Councilor. The Master Councilor is elected by members of his Chapter and is usually among the older members of the group. The Master Councilor is assisted in his duties by a Senior Councilor and a Junior Councilor. The remaining officers of a Chapter are appointed by the Master Councilor, except for the Scribe, who is appointed by the Chapter's advisory council.

Adult men mentor and supervise the Chapter. These men are often Masons or Senior DeMolays, or previous members who reached the age of 21, but can also be other men in the community, including the fathers of active members. Women can also serve as Advisors.

In addition to the individual Chapter, DeMolay has an officer structure at the state, provincial, or other large regional level led by a State Master Councilor, Provincial Master Councilor, or Jurisdictional Master Councilor. In some countries, DeMolay may have a national level organization headed by a "National Master Councilor". There are also other state, provincial, or jurisdictional positions, based on the officers of a chapter, which vary for each jurisdiction. The lead advisor, who must be a Master Mason and a member of the Supreme Council, in a state, jurisdiction, or country, is called an Executive Officer. The lead advisor internationally is known as a Grand Master, who governs the International Supreme Council. There are also Active DeMolay officers at an international level; the International Master Councilor and International Congress Secretary are the heads of the International DeMolay Congress. These officers are always past Jurisdictional Master Councilors.

In the US, President Franklin D. Roosevelt, President Harry S. Truman, and President Gerald R. Ford have been Honorary Grand Masters of the Order of DeMolay.

=== Female youth leaders ===
Some DeMolay Chapters elect young women to positions of leadership, who act to support members and their activities. These positions are not officially recognized by DeMolay International; they are approved subject to the authority of the Executive Officer in the jurisdiction.

==== Sweetheart ====
DeMolay Chapters may elect a "Chapter Sweetheart" to serve as the female representative of the Chapter, although she is not an initiated member of DeMolay. Her duties may include attending Chapter functions and acting as an ambassador of DeMolay. Members of Job's Daughters, Rainbow for Girls, and other Masonic Youth Organizations for young women are often considered for this position.

==== Chapter Princess ====
A Chapter may also elect a Chapter Princess. The program generally uses the same requirements as set forth for the Sweetheart. Her duties generally include attending Chapter functions and acting as an ambassador of DeMolay while assisting the Sweetheart in her duties.

==== Chapter Duchess ====
A Chapter may also elect two Chapter Duchesses. The program generally uses the same requirements set forth for the Sweetheart. Her duties generally include attending Chapter functions and acting as an ambassador of DeMolay while assisting both the Sweetheart and Princess in their duties.

==== Chapter Little Sis ====
A Little Sis is usually 14–16 years old. She generally assists both the Princess and the Sweetheart in their duties.

== Jurisdictional officers ==
Each state or jurisdiction holds an annual (or biennial, in some) event known as a Conclave or Convention. At this event, the members of the state or jurisdiction may vote on the State Master Councilor (or, in some cases the Provincial Master Councilor / Jurisdictional Master Councilor) and other elected positions. Some jurisdictions may elect a Deputy State Master Councilor, Sweetheart, or various other positions. In some cases, these officers are appointed by the executive officer of jurisdiction. Some jurisdictions may hold a specific event, called Congress, separate and apart from Conclave or Convention to elect their jurisdictional officers and vote on any changes to the jurisdictional by-laws, then install the new officers at their Conclave or Convention.

Jurisdictional/State Officers are the leaders of their state/jurisdiction. They plan, lead, and execute all of the events happening in their state. They also serve as a resource for the DeMolays in their state to help them with events, ceremonies, and any other DeMolay related activities.

== International leadership ==
The International Supreme Council is the governing body of DeMolay International. It is composed of adult leaders from around the world who are responsible for the management of DeMolay. The Grand Master, the Grand Senior Councilor, the Grand Junior Councilor, the Grand Secretary, and the Grand Treasurer are the elected leaders of the International Supreme Council. In certain parts of the world, such as Brazil, for example, DeMolay International has created daughter Supreme Councils and has ceded local control of DeMolay in those regions to the local Supreme Council.

=== Officers of DeMolay International ===
Name	Office	Details
Russ Scanlan	Grand Master	Russ Scanlan of Illinois was installed as Grand Master of DeMolay International in Chicago, IL on June 27, 2026.
Brad Northcutt	Grand Senior Councilor	Brad Northcutt of Oklahoma was installed as Grand Senior Councilor of DeMolay International in Chicago, IL on June 27, 2026.
Paul E. Mossberg	Grand Junior Councilor	Paul E. Mossberg of Pennsylvania was installed as Grand Junior Councilor of DeMolay International in Chicago, IL on June 27, 2026.
Gregory A. Chiles	Grand Treasurer	Gregory A. Chiles of Indiana was installed as Grand Treasurer of DeMolay International in Dallas, TX on June 19, 2021.
Ron Minshall	Grand Secretary	Ron Minshall of the Grand Lodge of Oklahoma was installed as Grand Secretary of DeMolay International in Orlando, FL on June 21, 2025.

The DeMolay Congress is the Senate-style body where two voting delegates represent each DeMolay jurisdiction. The delegates meet once a year and elect an International Master Councilor and an International Congress Secretary, who lead and serve as the heads of the body for a time span of one year. Two Active DeMolays, usually the International Master Councilor and International Congress Secretary, are elected as voting members of the board of directors annually. Additionally, delegates discuss and vote on legislative issues.

=== International Congress officers ===
Elected at the Annual Session in Chicago, IL in June 2026
Name	Office	From
Matthew McKay	60th International Master Councilor	Jurisdiction of Maryland
Kevin Durden	60th International Congress Secretary	Jurisdiction of Arkansas

== Adult supervision ==
Each chapter must be sponsored by a local Masonic body or some other group composed exclusively of Masons. The sponsoring body is responsible for providing the chapter with adult advisors and a place to meet. Members of the sponsoring body form the chapter's initial "advisory council". The advisory council selects one of its members to be its chairman, and he is the official liaison between the chapter and the sponsoring body. Another member of the advisory council is designated the "chapter advisor," and he is the official liaison between the advisory council and the chapter. The chapter's advisory council is responsible for supervising the chapter and its activities.

== Activities ==
DeMolays participate in a wide range of activities that may include, but are not limited to: camping, holding joint events with members of Rainbow and Job's Daughters, various sports, and taking long-distance trips. Both Chapters and individual DeMolays can participate in competitions at state and international events. On a local level, the chapter is responsible for planning and executing activities for its members.

== DeMolay International Hall of Fame ==
DeMolay alumni have gone on to achieve wide recognition outside of the organization. Some have been elected to the DeMolay Hall of Fame. Not all DeMolays who have received recognition have been inducted into the Hall of Fame; some can be found on other lists.

The following is a partial list of the members of the DeMolay Hall of Fame. The full list is available on the DeMolay International Web site.

Name	Dates	Induction date	Profession	Notes
Carl B. Albert	1908–2000		Politician	Speaker of the United States House of Representatives (1971–1977)
Walt Disney	1901-1966		Entertainer, Entrepreneur	Founder of Walt Disney Studios
Cecil D. Andrus	1931-2017		Politician	Governor of Idaho (1971–1977, 1987–1995), US Secretary of the Interior (1977–1981)
Reubin O'Donovan Askew	1928–2014		Politician	37th Governor of Florida (1971–1979)
Walter "Red" Barber	1908–1992		Sports broadcaster	Recipient of Ford C. Frick Award from National Baseball Hall of Fame
Mel Blanc	1908–1989		Cartoon voice actor	"Man of a Thousand Voices"
Frank Borman	1928–2023		Astronaut	Commander of Apollo 8, CEO of Eastern Airlines (1975–1986), recipient of Congressional Space Medal of Honor
Vance D. Brand	b. 1931		Astronaut	Flew on Apollo–Soyuz and three Space Shuttle missions
Richard Bryan	b. 1937		Politician	Governor of Nevada (1983–89), and as a United States Senator from Nevada from 1989 to 2001
Carroll A. Campbell, Jr.	1940–2005		Politician	Governor of South Carolina (1987–1995)
Curtis L. Carlson	1914–1999		Entrepreneur, philanthropist	Founded the Carlson Companies in 1938 as the Gold Bond Trading Company
Mel Carnahan	1934–2000		Politician	Governor of Missouri (1991–2000)
Bill Clinton	b. 1946		Politician	42nd President of the United States
Gary Collins	1938–2012		Actor	Best known for Airport (1970)
Lee S. Dreyfus	1926–2008		Educator and politician	Governor of Wisconsin (1979–1983)
Buddy Ebsen	1908–2003		Actor, singer, dancer	Star of Barnaby Jones and The Beverly Hillbillies
David Goodnow	b. 1939		Broadcast journalist	Former anchor of CNN Headline News
Paul Harvey	1918–2009		ABC Radio broadcaster	Recipient of Presidential Medal of Freedom
Mark Hatfield	1922–2011		Politician	Governor of Oregon (1959–1967), US Senator (1967–1997)
Burl Ives	1909–1995		Folk singer and actor	Have a Holly Jolly Christmas, narrator of Rudolph the Red-Nosed Reindeer
Henry M. Jackson	1912–1983		Politician	US Senator (1953–1983)
Brereton C. Jones	b. 1939		Politician	Governor of Kentucky (1991–1995)
Harmon Killebrew	1936–2011		Former professional baseball player and businessman	Member of National Baseball Hall of Fame
Tom Leppert	b. 1954		59th mayor of Dallas, Texas	
Elmer Lower	1913–2011		Journalist, media executive	Former president of ABC News
Bob Mathias	1930–2006		Olympic athlete; politician	Two-time Olympic gold medalist; US Representative from California (1967–1975)
Edgar D. Mitchell	1930–2016		Astronaut	Sixth man to walk on the Moon; Apollo 14 astronaut
Tom Osborne	b. 1937		Athlete, coach, politician	Former head coach at the University of Nebraska–Lincoln; member of College Football Hall of Fame
Walter C. Ploeser	1907–1993		Businessman, politician	US Representative from Missouri (1941–1949); US Ambassador to Paraguay (1957–1959), US Ambassador to Costa Rica (1970–1972)
Richard Riley	b. 1933		Politician	United States Secretary of Education under President Bill Clinton and the 111th Governor of South Carolina
Pete Rose	b. 1941-2024		Baseball player	All-time Major League Baseball leader in hits, with 4,256
James Nicholas Rowe	1938–1989		United States Army Colonel	Vietnam POW; author of Five Years to Freedom
Edward T. Schafer	b. 1946		Politician	29th United States Secretary of Agriculture; Governor of North Dakota 1992–2000
Harold Schafer	1912–2001		Philanthropist and businessman	Founder of Gold Seal Company
Lance P. Sijan	1942–1968		United States Air Force Captain	Recipient of the Medal of Honor
Alex Spanos	1923–2018		Owner of the San Diego Chargers	
Jim Steeg	b. 1950		American Sports Executive with the National Football League	Credited with popularizing and improving the Super Bowl.
John Steinbeck	1902–1968		Pulitzer Prize-winning author and Nobel laureate	Wrote The Grapes of Wrath and Of Mice and Men
John Cameron Swayze	1906–1995		Newscaster	
Fran Tarkenton	b. 1940		Professional football player; businessman; entrepreneur	Member of Pro Football Hall of Fame and College Football Hall of Fame
John Wayne	1907–1979	1986	Actor	Won Academy Award for Best Actor for True Grit in 1969.
Larry Wilcox	b. 1947		Actor, Businessman	
James C. Wright, Jr.	1922–2015		Politician	Speaker of the United States House of Representatives (1987–1989)

== See also ==
- Delta Sigma Lambda
- Theta Alpha
