= Japanese South Korean =

Japanese South Korean or North South Japanese may refer to:

- Japan-South Korea relations
- Japanese people in South Korea
- South Koreans in Japan

== See also ==
- Mindan, the pro-South Korean ethnic representative organisation for Koreans in Japan
- Zainichi Korean language, the dialect of Korean spoken in Japan
