= Korea International School (Japan) =

International school in Osaka, Japan

- コリア国際学園 中等部・高等部 코리아국제중고등학교

- The school in Ibaraki, Osaka Prefecture, in 2023

Location
- 2-13-35 Toyokawa; Ibaraki, Osaka Prefecture, 567-0057; Japan; 34°49′57.9″N 135°32′3.5″E

Information
- Other name: KIS
- Type: Private international school
- Established: April 2008
- Authority: Korea International School Educational Foundation
- Grades: Junior and senior high school
- Gender: Coeducational
- Language: Japanese, Korean and English
- Accreditation: International Baccalaureate
- Affiliation: UNESCO Associated Schools Network
- Website: kiskorea.ed.jp

Korea International School (コリア国際学園, Koria Kokusai Gakkō; Korean: 코리아 국제학원; KIS) is a Korean junior and senior high school in Ibaraki, Osaka Prefecture, Japan. It was established in 2008.

The government of Osaka Prefecture classifies the school as a "miscellaneous school".

== Curriculum ==
The school's curriculum covers both North and South Korea, and this applies to its Korean history and language classes. Most of the school's classes are taught in Japanese. In 2014 the school's vice principal, Om Chang Joon, stated that many parents felt that North and South Korea-aligned schools should not be copying the curriculum found in Korea, and that is why KIS developed its own curriculum.

The school has Japanese, Korean, and English language classes.

== Student body ==
As of 2014 the school had 86 students. Most of them were ethnic Koreans, some of whom had previously lived outside Japan and later returned, while a few were ethnic Japanese.

== See also ==
Japanese international schools in South Korea:

- Japanese School in Seoul
- Busan Japanese School
