= The Federation of Korean Associations, Japan =

Ethnic organization in Japan

- 재일본한국인연합회
- Formation: May 20, 2001; 25 years ago
- Type: Nonprofit
- Purpose: Support Koreans in Japan and Japan–South Korea relations
- Headquarters: 2-chōme-1-8 Ōkubo, Shinjuku City, Tokyo 169-0072, Japan
- Website: https://haninhe.com/

The Federation of Korean Associations, Japan (Korean: 재일본한국인연합회; Hanja: 在日本韓國人聯合會; Short name: 한인회; Japanese: 在日本韓国人連合会) is an ethnic association for Koreans in Japan. It caters primarily to recent South Korean emigrants. It is headquartered in Shin-Ōkubo, Tokyo, Japan.

It is a different organization from Mindan (The Korean Residents Union in Japan), which was founded by Zainichi Koreans and also aligns itself with South Korea.

== Activities ==
The organization facilitates support and communication for South Koreans in Japan, Zainichi Koreans, Japanese people, and South Koreans. It publishes a newsletter, organizes events for cultural exchange and business purposes, advocates for South Korean immigrant rights in Japan, and promotes economic ties between the relevant communities and countries. The group also offers advice and services to immigrants. It advocates for friendlier Japan–South Korea relations, and provides services that help South Koreans immigrants integrate into Japanese society.

== History ==
Koreans first significantly emigrated to Japan during the 1910–1945 Japanese colonial period. After the 1945 liberation of Korea, around half of the Korean population remained in Japan; they and their descendents are now called "Zainichi Koreans". For decades afterwards, few South Koreans settled in Japan for a number of reasons, but namely strained Japan–South Korea relations and South Korean restrictions on emigration. Beginning in the early 1980s, amidst a labor shortage in Japan, Japan began allowing more foreign exchange students and workers from South Korea. By the end of that decade, South Korea loosened its emigration policies. South Koreans began arriving in significant numbers, and often settled in the district of Ōkubo, Tokyo. These recent South Korean immigrants are sometimes called "newcomers" (뉴커머) by the Zainichi Korean population.

The organization has its origins in a small organization founded in September 2000. It initially had six members and was called "The Association in Consideration of [South] Koreans in Japan" (Korean: 재일한국인을 생각하는 모임). By December 2, 2000, they held a meeting in which they decided to significantly expand the organization, and proposed that it be called "The Federation of Korean Associations, Japan". They prepared for its creation, and eventually held their first official meeting and inauguration on May 20, 2001. At the time of creation, they had 400 registered members. By the end of the year, they had over 1,800.

Beginning in the late 2010s, the group has experienced some internal conflict. An effort was made to modify the organization's structure in order to absorb other similar Korean associations in Japan. However, disagreement over this process and a dispute over the legitimacy of an internal election led to a smaller splinter group leaving the organization and founding another in September 2022 (similarly named; 일반사단법인 재일본한국인연합회; lit. 'General Aggregated Corporation The Federation of Korean Associations, Japan'), which is now also based in Tokyo.
