= Ibaraki (surname) =

Ibaraki or Ibaragi (Japanese: 茨木) is a Japanese surname. Notable people with the surname include:

- Mitsuba Ibaraki (born 1988), Japanese footballer
- Noriko Ibaragi (Japanese: 茨木 のり子, 1926–2006), Japanese writer
- Stephen Ibaraki, Canadian information technology professional
- Toshihide Ibaraki (Japanese: 茨木 俊秀, born 1940), Japanese computer scientist

== Fictional characters ==
- Kasen Ibaraki, a character in Wild and Horned Hermit from the video game franchise Touhou Project
- Takeru Ibaraki, a protagonist in the manga Wichblade Takeru

== See also ==
- Ibaraki Prefecture
- Ibaraki (disambiguation)
