= Japanese people in Korea =

Korean name
- Hangul: 재한·조선 일본인
- Hanja: 在韓·朝鮮 日本人
Transcriptions
- Revised Romanization: Jaehan/Joseon Ilbonin
- McCune–Reischauer: Chaehan/Chosŏn Ilbonin

Japanese name
- Kanji: 在韓・朝鮮日本人
- Kana: ざいかん・ちょうせんにほんじん
Transcriptions
- Romanization: Zaikan/Chōsen Nihonjin

Japanese in Korea are Japanese people who work and live on the Korean Peninsula in one of the two countries:

- Japanese people in North Korea
- Japanese people in South Korea
