= Nak-ku Choi =

South Korean civil servant (1918–2003)

- 최낙구
- Choi in 1967
- Born: August 11, 1918; Goseong County, South Gyeongsang, Korea
- Died: February 25, 2003 (aged 84); Phoenix, Arizona, United States
- Occupations: Education administrator and civil servant
- Known for: Director of the National Library of Korea; Director of the National Science Museum of Korea; Director of the Compilation Bureau, Ministry of Education

Nak-ku Choi (Korean: 최낙구; Hanja: 崔洛久; August 11, 1918 – February 25, 2003) was a South Korean education administrator and civil servant. His career encompassed education, libraries, science, cultural heritage, and academic administration. He served as director of the National Library of Korea and the National Science Museum of Korea, and held senior positions in the Ministry of Education and the National Institute of Korean History. His work included efforts leading to the enactment of South Korea's first Library Act in 1963, the postwar reconstruction and development of the National Science Museum, and international cooperation involving academic, library, museum, and overseas Korean educational institutions.

== Early life and education ==
Choi was born on August 11, 1918, in Goseong County, South Gyeongsang Province. He first studied the Classics at a traditional village school before entering modern schools. In 1935 he entered Hokushin Commercial School (北神商業學校) in Kobe, Japan, graduating in 1940. He then entered the commercial course of the professional division of Kansai University, but withdrew in 1941. His official personnel record gives the reason for his withdrawal as an "anti-Japanese student incident" (반일학생사건). Korea was then under Japanese colonial rule, which lasted from 1910 to 1945.

In 1961 Choi entered the National Defense Graduate School and completed a paper entitled Korean Labor Problems and Population (한국노동문제와 인구) in 1962.

== Early administrative career and cultural heritage ==
Choi began his career in local administration during the final years of Japanese rule. After Korea's liberation, he served as head of Gaechon-myeon in Goseong County and took part in local recovery work during the Korean War. He entered the Ministry of Education in 1953 and later worked in planning and cultural heritage administration.

By 1957 he was working in the ministry's cultural preservation division. His work included the postwar restoration of cultural properties, notably the reconstruction of Chokseongnu in Jinju. In a later account, Choi recalled that he had arranged for reconstruction funds to be included in the 1958 government budget and defended the expenditure before the National Assembly's education committee. In 1960 he published a six-part series explaining Korean cultural properties in the Ministry of Education's Monthly Education Review (문교월보). As head of the cultural preservation division in 1961, he also participated in work connected with the restoration of Seokguram, which was carried out with UNESCO technical assistance.

== National Academy of Sciences ==
In 1959 Choi became the first director of the secretariat of the National Academy of Sciences of the Republic of Korea after its administrative office was formally organized. A later account by Han Seung-eun, who worked with him at the Academy, credited Choi with organizing its early administrative structure and promoting exchanges with foreign academies and academic organizations, including American institutions and the Pacific Science Association. During this period the Academy also expanded its international academic contacts and joined the International Council of Scientific Unions (ICSU) in 1961.

Choi summarized the Academy's operations in a report published in its bulletin in 1960.

== National Library and the Library Act ==
Choi became director of the National Library in May 1963. At the time, the institution faced shortages of books, space, and funding. In a June 1963 newspaper interview, Choi publicly called for the prompt enactment of a national library law. At a roundtable organized by The Chosun Ilbo in September, he described overcrowding at the National Library and argued for the expansion of public and school libraries, mobile library services, and greater emphasis on reading habits in schools.

Librarian Song Bong-seop later recalled that Choi regarded legislation as essential to establishing the functions and organization of libraries, facility standards, legal deposit, and a professional librarian system. Song also described Choi's repeated efforts to persuade officials of the Supreme Council for National Reconstruction to advance the bill.

The proposed Library Act was passed by the relevant standing committee of the Supreme Council for National Reconstruction on October 7, 1963. The Supreme Council exercised legislative authority under the military government established after the May 1961 coup led by General Park Chung Hee. The law was promulgated as Act No. 1424 on October 28, 1963. A Chosun Ilbo editorial noted that its enactment had been delayed for about eight years.

The Act established standards for library operation and facilities and institutionalized legal deposit and the professional librarian system. The National Library was reorganized as the National Central Library, and Choi became its first director under the new name.

In 1964, Choi attended an Asia-Pacific regional seminar on the development of national libraries in Manila as South Korea's representative, where he presented the situation of Korean libraries. He later published a two-part account of the seminar in Dohyeop Wolbo.

== National Science Museum and international cooperation ==
Choi was appointed director of the National Science Museum in 1964. The museum had been greatly reduced after its building on Namsan was destroyed during the Korean War. Choi sought to develop it from a small, largely exhibition-oriented institution into a science center combining exhibition, research, experimentation, and education.

He organized Korean scientists to participate in planning the museum's development. According to Kang Young-sun, the resulting planning committee met 52 times during Choi's tenure. International cooperation became an important part of the reconstruction effort. Contacts with American scientific and museum organizations led to an international conference hosted by the National Science Museum in Seoul in September 1966.

Participants included representatives of the U.S. National Academy of Sciences, the American Association of Museums, the Smithsonian's National Museum of Natural History, and the Bishop Museum in Hawaii, together with Korean scientists. They discussed the character and development of the proposed new museum and possible foreign assistance in materials and technical expertise.

According to Kang, discussions also included possible assistance from the Smithsonian Institution and other American museum institutions and the dispatch of American specialists to Korea. In his opening address, Choi argued that the new institution should not remain a static museum devoted primarily to displaying objects but should develop into a science center with research and experimental functions.

== Curriculum, publishing, and historical research administration ==
In 1967 Choi became director of the secretariat of the National Institute of Korean History, and on September 1 that year, Choi was appointed director-general of the Compilation Bureau of the Ministry of Education. At the time, the bureau was responsible for curriculum development, the compilation of government-designated textbooks, the review and approval of other textbooks, and research on the Korean language and educational materials. During his tenure, the ministry's organizational regulations were amended to establish subject-specific specialist positions within the bureau—compilation officers, deputy compilation officers, and assistant compilation officers—responsible for curriculum research and the compilation, review, and approval of textbooks. According to Choi Young-bok's retrospective account, Choi also oversaw the revision of authorized middle- and high-school textbooks and supplementary teaching materials, coordinating competing interests among the state textbook company and private publishers.

He returned to the National Institute of Korean History as secretariat director in 1968. Historian Lee Hyeon-jong later credited him with helping secure the site and funding for the institute's new facilities in Daehyeon-dong, Seoul. Lee also recalled that Choi recognized the declining number of specialists in Korea and Japan capable of deciphering historical documents written in older Japanese cursive scripts and initiated a project to decipher and organize documents relating to Tsushima, an important body of material for the study of Korea–Japan relations.

== School administration and overseas Korean education ==
Choi moved into school administration in 1969 as principal of Changdeok Girls' Middle School. In 1972 he became the first principal of Yeouido High School, preparing the school for its opening the following year. Later accounts credited him with establishing school regulations and developing facilities including the grounds, auditorium, library, and special classrooms.

In 1976 he became principal of Deoksu Commercial High School and was involved in its relocation from central Seoul to Haengdang-dong.

From 1977 to 1980, Choi served as principal of the Tokyo Korean School. Accounts by fellow educators describe his emphasis on Korean-language education, Korean culture, and a sense of Korean identity among second-generation Korean students in Japan.

He became principal of Hyehwa Girls' High School in 1980, where he promoted the expansion of school facilities and audiovisual teaching equipment. In 1982 he was appointed to the overseas Korean education subcommittee of the Ministry of Education's policy advisory committee. He retired in 1983.

== Later life and death ==
He died in Phoenix, Arizona, United States, on February 24, 2003, local time (February 25 in Korea), at the age of 84.

== Selected works ==
- Choi Nak-ku (최낙구), 〈문화재 해설〉 ["Commentary on Cultural Properties"], six-part series, 문교월보 [Monthly Education Review], Ministry of Education, 1960.
- Choi Nak-ku, 〈원무보고: 학술원 운영개황〉 ["Operational Report: Overview of the National Academy of Sciences"], 학술원회보, no. 3, September 30, 1960, pp. 42–45.
- Choi Nak-ku, 한국노동문제와 인구 [Korean Labor Problems and Population], National Defense Graduate School, 1962.
- Choi Nak-ku, 〈아세아 태평양지역 국립도서관 발전에 관한 세미나에 참석하고〉 ["After Attending the Seminar on the Development of National Libraries in the Asia-Pacific Region"], parts 1–2, 도협월보, vol. 5, nos. 2 and 4, 1964.
- Choi Nak-ku, 〈국립중앙도서관과 나〉 ["The National Central Library and Me"], 도서관 [The Library], no. 105, 1966, pp. 29–32.
- Choi Nak-ku, 〈특집: 국립중앙도서관 전 관장의 회고록〉 ["Special Feature: Recollections of a Former Director of the National Central Library"], 도서관 [The Library], no. 184, May 1973, p. 22.

== Honors ==
- Hongjo Soseong Hunjang (홍조소성훈장; 紅條素星勳章), corresponding to the present-day Red Stripes grade of the Order of Service Merit, December 17, 1963
- Seongnyu Medal of the Order of Civil Merit (국민훈장 석류장), 1977
