= Korean schools in Japan =

Korean schools in Japan or Zainichi Korean schools may refer to:

- Chōsen gakkō - North Korean schools in Japan
- South Korean schools operated by the Mindan
