= Baekdu Hagwon =

Korean school in Osaka, Japan

- 建国幼・小・中・高等学校 건국 유·소·중·고등학교

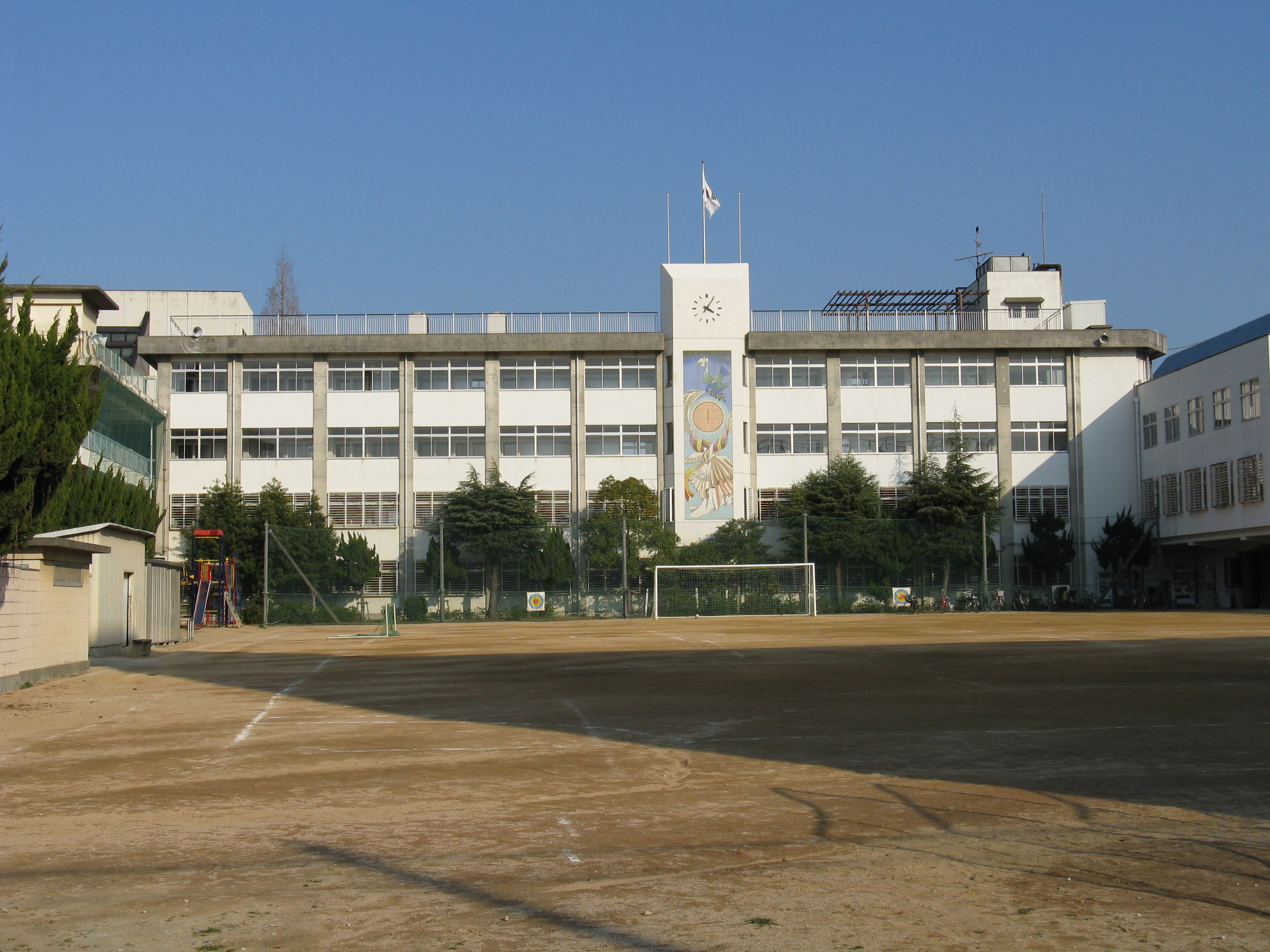

Location
- 2-3-13 Oriono, Sumiyoshi-ku; Osaka, 558-0032; Japan; 34°35′49″N 135°29′57″E

Information
- Type: Private school
- Established: 16 March 1946; 80 years ago
- Founder: Cho Kyuhoon
- Grades: Kindergarten through high school
- Language: Japanese, Korean and English
- Website: keonguk.ac.jp

Baekdu Hagwon

Educational Foundation Baekdu Hagwon Keonguk, commonly known as Baekdu Hagwon, is a South Korean-affiliated educational institution in Sumiyoshi-ku, Osaka, Japan. The foundation operates the Keonguk schools (建国幼・小・中・高等学校; 건국 유·소·중·고등학교), which provide education from kindergarten through high school. It is recognized by the government of Osaka Prefecture as an Article 1 private school under the School Education Act.

The Keonguk Industrial School and Keonguk Higher Girls' School of the Baekdu Association were founded in March 1946.

== Overview ==
The school was established on the premise of providing ethnic education to Korean residents in Japan and has received approval as an "Ichijo School" (regular school) under Article 1 of the School Education Law. Therefore, Zainichi Koreans, Japanese students, and South Korean nationals can all be enrolled. The school contains Keonguk Kindergarten, Keonguk Elementary School, Keonguk Junior High School, and Keonguk High School.

== Education ==
Throughout kindergarten, elementary school, middle school, and high school, ethnic education incorporating Korean language and Korean culture is provided in the curriculum. Korean language classes are held for 3 to 5 hours per week, and subjects related to Korean geography, history, and Korean culture such as Taekwondo and Samulnori are also taught. In regular classes, approved Japanese textbooks are used, and instruction is primarily conducted in Japanese.

English education is introduced from the first year of elementary school, and in middle school, a "Trilingual Course" is offered aiming for proficiency in Japanese, Korean, and English through integrated learning time. In high school, an "English-American Culture Course" focusing on English education is established, emphasizing English proficiency.

Additionally, in high school, a "Special Advancement Course" specialized for university entrance exams is offered, and the school has achieved certain success in university admissions while conducting ethnic education. The affiliated schools with designated school recommendations include not only Japanese universities such as Doshisha University but also Korean universities like Yonsei University.

== History ==
- 1946 - Established as Kookmin Technical School and Kookmin Girls' High School (prewar system)
- 1947 - Renamed Kookmin Junior High School (under the new education system)
- 1948 - Established Kookmin High School
- 1949 - Established Kookmin Elementary School, approved as a foundation by the Ministry of Education (at the time)
- 1951 - Approved as a school corporation and became an "Ichijo School"
- 1997 - Established Kookmin Kindergarten
- 2021 - Introduced menstrual leave for high school students for the first time in Japan

== Notable alumni ==
- Lee Dae-hwi, South Korean singer

== See also ==
Japanese international schools in South Korea:

- Japanese School in Seoul
- Busan Japanese School

Mindan (Affiliate Korean organization in Japan)
