= Mindan =

Organization for Koreans in Japan

Korean Residents Union in Japan

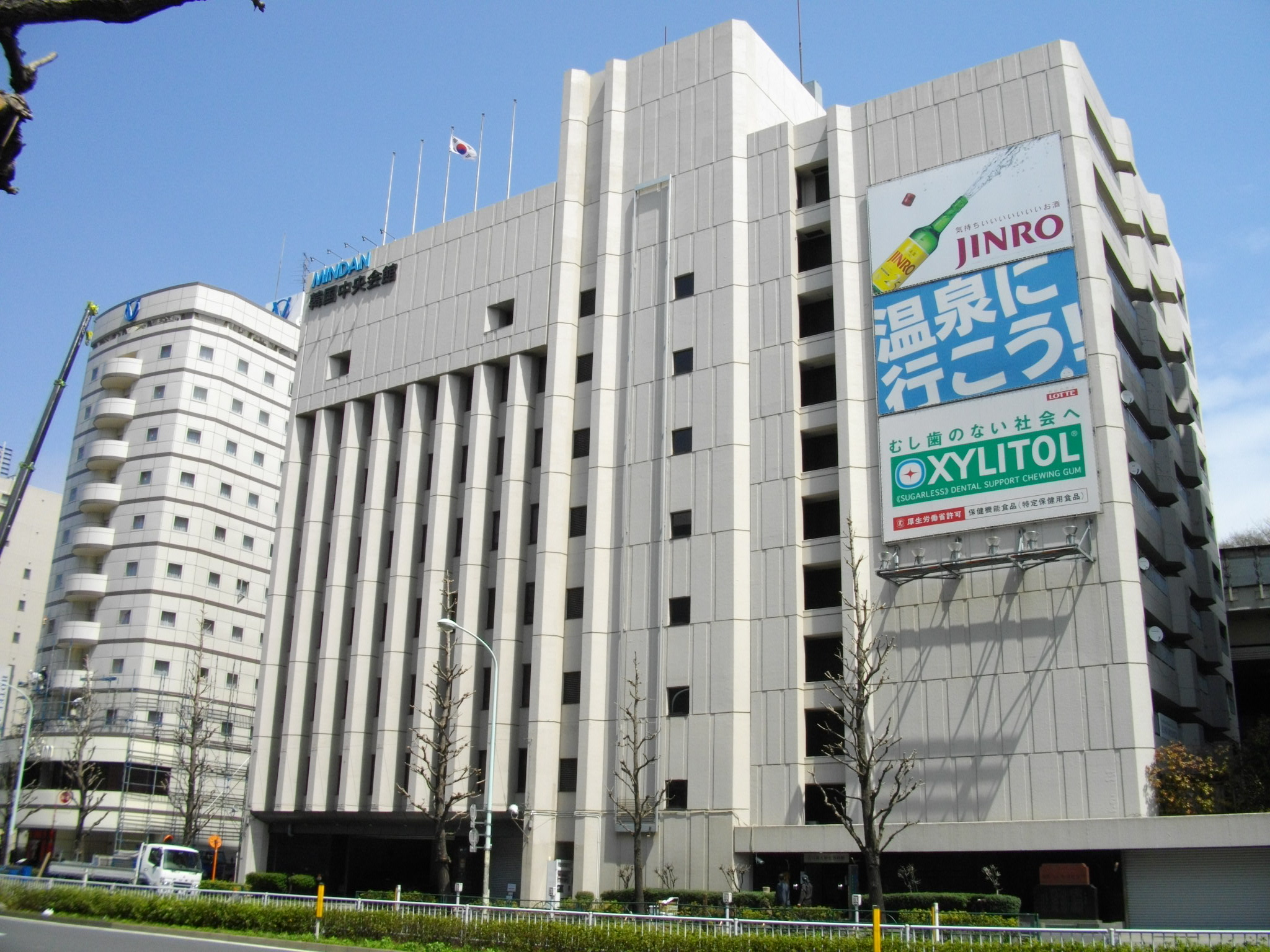
- Abbreviation: Mindan
- Formation: 3 October 1946; 80 years ago
- Type: NGO
- Location: Southern Azabu 1-7-32, Minato, Tokyo
- Official language: Korean, Japanese
- Website: www.mindan.org

Korean Residents Union in Japan
- Flag of Mindan

Japanese name
- Kanji: 在日本大韓民国民団
- Kana: ざいにほんだいかんみんこくみんだん
Transcriptions
- Revised Hepburn: Zai-Nihon Daikanminkoku Mindan

Korean name
- Hangul: 재일본대한민국민단
- Hanja: 在日本大韓民國民團
Transcriptions
- Revised Romanization: Jae-Ilbon Daehanminguk Mindan
- McCune–Reischauer: Chae-Ilbon Taehanmin'guk Mindan

Mindan (Korean: 민단, Hanja: 民團), or the Korean Residents Union in Japan (Korean: 재일본대한민국민단, Japanese: 在日本大韓民国民団), is one of two main organizations for Koreans living in Japan, the other being Chongryon. Mindan has ties to South Korea and was established in 1946 in Tokyo, Japan. Currently, among the 610,000 Korean residents in Japan who have not become naturalized Japanese citizens, 65% are members of Mindan, and another 25% are members of Chongryon.

Mindan members prefer the modern South Korean term Kankoku (韓国) to be used when discussing Korea. Chongryon members, some of whom are North Korean fellow travellers, prefer the older term Chōsen (朝鮮). Because Chōsen was the Korean term used during the Japanese rule of Korea and North Korea does not recognize Kankoku, this causes enmity between the groups.

== History ==
Mindan was established in 1946 as the Zai-Nihon Chōsen Kyoryū Mindan (在日本朝鮮居留民団). With the founding of South Korea in 1948 the name Chōsen was dropped, and the organization was reincorporated as Zai-Nihon Daikanminkoku Kyoryū Mindan (在日本大韓民国居留民団). The Korean War (1950–1953) brought about a sharp division between members of Chongryon and Mindan, with each organization strongly supporting the North or South respectively. Mindan members went to Korea as volunteer soldiers in the conflict. Posters made by Mindan during this time period display Mindan’s close ties to Zainichi Koreans’ native soil with patriotic and militaristic undertones reminiscent of South Korea’s military dictatorship at the time.

As a new generation of Zainichi Koreans emerged in the 1970s whose primary language was Japanese instead of Korean, Mindan posters developed during this time saw an increase of Japanese text being used over Hangul. However, Mindan steered away from advocating full assimilation into Japanese society, instead promoting their minority status among members through emphasizing introspection.

As the term kyoryū, meaning "resident", became a politically sensitive term, the organization adopted its present name in 1994 by simply dropping the term kyoryū. Despite the formal renaming of the organization, it has been consistently known as Kankoku Mindan or simply Mindan in Japan.

During the 2000s, Mindan experienced a progressive movement, influenced by South Korea’s left-leaning president at the time: Kim Dae-jung. In 2006, one faction of Mindan announced an amelioration of relations with Chongryon, which sparked backlash among the more traditional right-leaning core of Mindan. A few weeks after the declaration, the faction initially issuing the announcement retracted their proclamation.

In recent times, Mindan has lost members as a result of Japanese naturalization among Zainichi Koreans. It has also been occasionally threatened by extreme right-wing organizations; in one incident in 2010, the Kyoto branch of Mindan cancelled a lecture due to the threat of Zaitokutai protesters interfering with the event. Regardless, today, it still holds the status of Japan's largest Zainichi organization. The organization tabulates its total number of members using South Korean nationality as a metric.

== Relations with Chongryon ==
Early Mindan history focused on aligning the organization in opposition to Chongryon, which aligned itself with the North Korean government. For the first two decades of its existence, Mindan generally remained less popular than Chongryon among Zainichi Koreans. One reason for this trend included how Mindan was primarily viewed as unreceptive to lower class Koreans in Japan at the time.

Beginning in the 1960s, Mindan’s primary goals shifted from expressing loyalty to their homeland on the Korean peninsula to seeking permanent residency in Japan. With Japan and South Korea's adoption of the Normalization Treaty in 1965, many Zainichi Koreans became members of Mindan in order to gain the benefits of South Korean citizenship. During this time period, around 48,000 former members of Chongryon left the organization to join Mindan instead. The two factions made some small strides towards cooperation during the 1960s-1970s, when they attempted to advocate for reunification of the Korean peninsula together. More recently, in a few events concerning human rights activism from 2013–16, Chongryon and Mindan representatives have both made appearances, but never intentionally together.

Mindan’s association with South Korea has given it an edge over Chongryon among Zainichi Koreans, as they associate the country with prosperity in comparison to its northern counterpart. Among Japanese people, Mindan has been met with warmer reception because of its goal on developing a shared sense of well-being among Koreans in Japan, as well as its focus on Japanese integration instead of spreading political ideology. However, like Chongryon, it too has lost members as a result of Japanese naturalization among Zainichi Koreans. This decline is expected to continue for the near-future, as younger generations of Zainichi Koreans increasingly associate themselves as Japanese rather than Korean.

== Activities ==
All 47 prefectures of Japan host at least one branch of Mindan. Mindan's main activities include campaigning for a head of foreign investment regime in Japan, supporting newcomer Koreans to obtain special permanent residency, campaigning against the foreign registration order/law, and campaigning for the elimination of legal and economic disparity with native Japanese citizens. It has assisted Zainichi Koreans pursuing Japanese citizenship by overseeing the removal of biometric identification for foreign registration in Japan. They have also advocated for voting rights of Zainichi Koreans in local Japanese elections, voicing support for political parties such as the Liberal Democratic Party and the Democratic Party that back expanded voting rights for non-Japanese citizens. Through efforts to promote Koreans in Japan like demonstrations and petitions, as well as recruiting youth activists, Mindan has been credited with combatting discriminatory attitudes among Japanese people.

There are four schools across Japan that are Mindan-supported, one of which particularly caters to Korean expatriates; this number has decreased in the past few decades. The curriculum in these schools centers on providing a normalized Japanese education for students and developing Korean language proficiency.

Mindan provided food supplies for the victims of the 2011 Tōhoku earthquake and tsunami.

The organization publishes its own newspaper called the Mindan Shinbun.

Mindan has been involved in navigating South Korean-Japanese relations, especially after bilateral relations between the two nations tensed up in the late 2010s. In one incident in 2017, Mindan helped push support for the relocation of a statue in front of the Japanese consulate in Busan, South Korea’s second largest city, said to symbolize World War II-era sexual abuse of Korean women by Japan. They have periodically communicated to the South Korean government about other matters such as its own internal demographic shifts and suffrage efforts.

== Affiliates ==
Mindan has collaborated with other Zainichi Korean organizations such as the Korean Youth Association (在日本大韓民国青年会, Seinenkai) and the Korean Chamber of Commerce and Industry in Japan (KCCJ) in order to secure objectives such as helping Zainichi Koreans find employment or financial assistance during the COVID-19 pandemic.

- Republic of Korea Woman Association in Japan
- Zainichi Korean Apprentice Volunteers' Comerade Association
- Korean Sport Association in Japan
- Korean Chamber of Commerce & Industry in Japan
- Korean Youth Association in Japan
- Republic of Korea Student Association in Japan
- Korean Scientist Association in Japan
- Korean Lawyer Forum in Japan
- United Korean Credit Association in Japan
- Korean Culture and Art Association in Japan
- Korean Doctor Association in Japan
- Korean School League in Japan
- Mindan Life Introducing Center
- Mindan North Korean Defector Support Center
- Zainichi Korean History Museum
- Korean schools (Kankoku gakkō)
  - Educational Foundation Baekdu Hagwon
    - Keonguk Kindergarten
    - Keonguk Elementary School
    - Keonguk Primary School
    - Keonguk High School
  - Osaka Kongo International Elementary, Middle & High School
  - Tokyo Korean School
  - Kyoto International Junior and Senior High School

== See also ==
- Japan-Korea relations
- Ethnic issues in Japan
- Koreatowns in Japan
- Korean diaspora (a.k.a. 'Dongpo' or 'Gyopo')
- Chongryon, similar organization with close ties to North Korea
- The Federation of Korean Associations, Japan, similar organization meant for post-1945 South Korean immigrants
- Embassy of South Korea, Tokyo
