= Kongo Gakuen =

Korean school in Osaka, Japan

- 大阪金剛インターナショナル小学校・中学校・高等学校 오사카금강인터내셔널소중고등학교

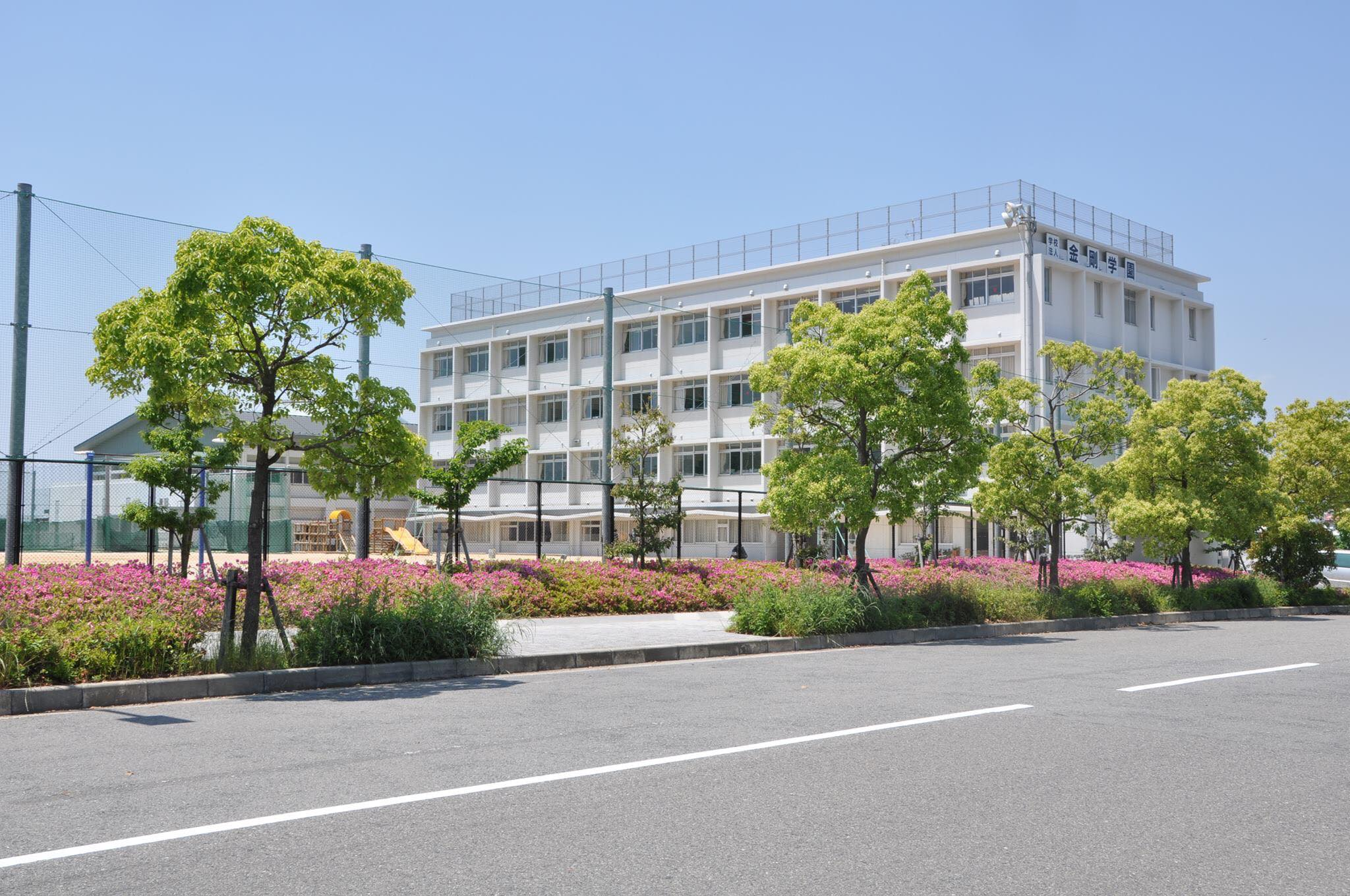
- The school building in 2020

Location
- 2-6-10 Nankokita, Suminoe-ku; Osaka, Osaka Prefecture, 559-0034; Japan; 34.6395°N 135.4073°E

Information
- Other name: Osaka Kongo International School
- Type: Private Korean international school
- Established: 5 April 1946
- Authority: Kongo Gakuen Educational Foundation
- Grades: Elementary through senior high school
- Gender: Coeducational
- Website: www.kongogakuen.ed.jp

Kongo Gakuen Elementary, Middle & High School (金剛学園小学校・中学校・高等学校, Kongō Gakuen Shōgakkō Chūgakkō Kōtōgakkō; Korean: 오사카금강학원; RR: Geumgang Hagwon) is a South Korean international school in Suminoe-ku, Osaka, Japan. The school was established in 1946. It is recognised by the government of Osaka Prefecture as a private school under Article 1 of Japan's School Education Act.

== Overview ==
This school was established for the education of Koreans in Japan, but it is also recognized as an "Ichijo School" (regular school) under Japan's School Education Law. While it is often thought of as a school for Korean residents in Japan, enrollment is open to individuals regardless of nationality. The teaching staff primarily consists of dispatched teachers from the Korean government, Zainichi Koreans, and Japanese teachers.

Subjects related to the Korean language, Korean geography, history, and culture are taught as part of the curriculum prescribed by the Ministry of Education, Culture, Sports, Science and Technology. The goal is to foster global talents through cooperation between teachers from both Japan and Korea.

In the high school, an advanced course is offered with a curriculum tailored for students wishing to advance to universities in both Japan and South Korea.

Students start learning English from the first grade of elementary school, and in middle school, classes are conducted through a contract with a major English conversation school. There is also a focus on preparing for the Eiken (English proficiency test), with targeted preparation classes mainly held after school.

For Korean language education, efforts are made at the elementary education level to acquire basic language proficiency by implementing immersion education in some subjects starting from elementary school.

Being recognized by both Japan and Korea, students have the option to advance to universities in both countries. For Japanese universities, they have designated recommendation schools, including Doshisha University Faculty of Law, among others.

The tuition fee for high school is ¥483,360 per year (as of 2020), which is relatively low compared to general private high schools. Additionally, being a school that promotes education support for high school students under the high school tuition fee exemption system, depending on the household's annual income, the tuition fee may be exempt. The tuition fees for elementary and middle school are also relatively low compared to other private schools.

Former School Building in Nishinari Ward (July 2007) The school was previously located in Nishinari Ward, Osaka City, Umenan 2-chome (east of Umenan Elementary School), but due to the extension of Naniwa Street to the central part of Nishinari Ward, part of the school building was projected to be on the planned road. Therefore, in 2007, the school building was relocated to the Sakishima Cosmosquare area in Suminoe Ward, Osaka City. The former school site has now become part of a road, and the remaining area has become the Super Life Nishitenmaya store.

== Gallery ==
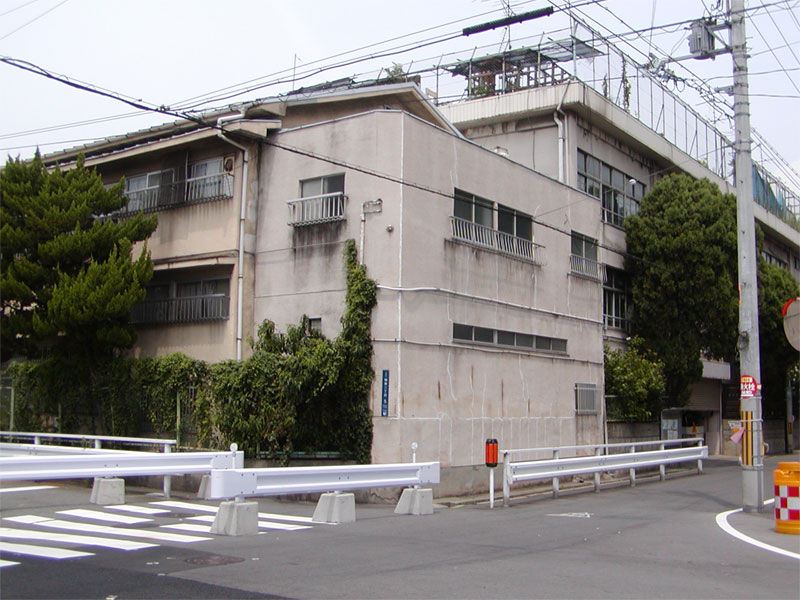
The former school building in Nishinari Ward in 2007

The school building in Suminoe Ward in 2008

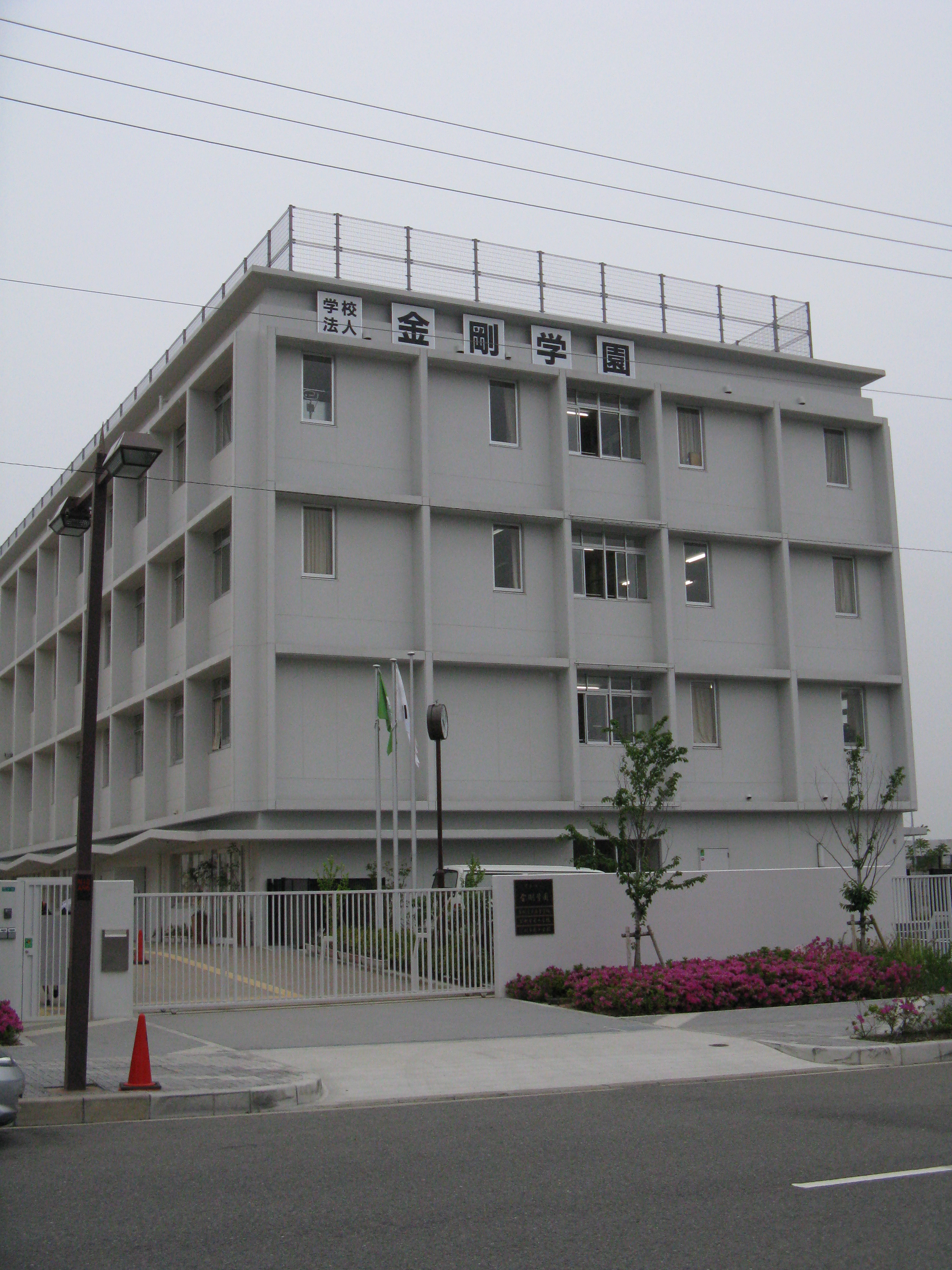
Alternative view of the building in Suminoe Ward, 2008

== See also ==
Japanese international schools in South Korea:

- Japanese School in Seoul
- Busan Japanese School
