= Kyoto International Junior and Senior High School =

Korean international school in Japan

- 京都国際中学校・高等学校 교토국제중학교・고등학교

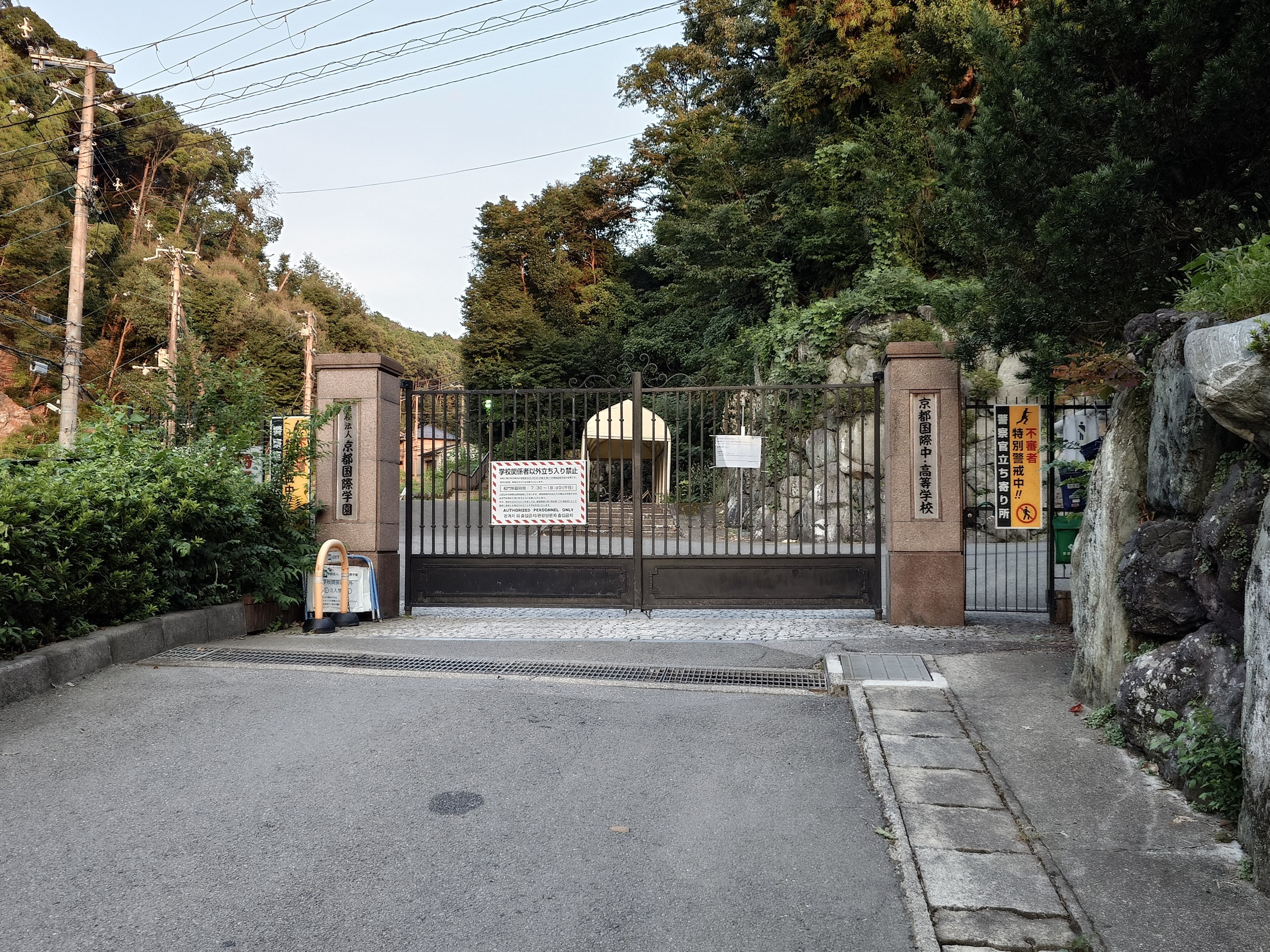
- Front Gate

Location
- 1 Imagumano Hondayama-chō; Higashiyama-ku, Kyoto City, Kyoto Prefecture; 605-0978; Japan; 34°58′32″N 135°46′51″E

Information
- Type: Private
- Established: 1947
- Gender: co-educational
- Integration: Integrated JHS/HS
- School code: 26542A
- Website: kyoto-kokusai.ed.jp

Kyoto International Junior and Senior High School (Japanese: 京都国際中学校・高等学校, Kyōto Kokusai Chūgakkō Kōtōgakkō; Korean: 교토국제중학교・고등학교; Hanja: 교토國際中學校・高等學校) is a Japanese school in Higashiyama-ku, Kyoto. It includes middle and high school levels. It is under the Educational Foundation Kyoto International School (Japanese: 学校法人 京都国際学園 Korean: 학교법인교토국제학원; Hanja: 學校法人교토國際學園). Founded in 1947 as Kyoto Chōsen Chūgaku (京都朝鮮中学), a school for Koreans living in Japan, the school was authorized as Kyoto Kankoku Gakuen (京都韓国学園) by the governor of Kyoto Prefecture in 1958. In 2003, the school was transformed into a school that complies with Article 1 of the School Education Act, which adheres to the curriculum guidelines set by the Japanese government, and was approved by the governor of Kyoto and reopened in 2004. Since then, the school has been accepting Japanese students, and by 2024, 90% of all students were Japanese.

== History ==
The origin of Kyoto International Junior and Senior High School dates back to the "Kyoto Chosen Chugaku" (Kyoto Korean Middle School) established in 1947 (Showa 22) for Koreans in Japan.

Later, in 1958, it received approval from the Governor of Kyoto Prefecture under the name "Kyoto Korean School Foundation."

In 2003, the Kyoto International School Foundation and Kyoto International Junior and Senior High School were established, and it was officially recognized by the Governor of Kyoto Prefecture as an "Ichijo School" (a regular junior and senior high school). This meant that it now accepted ethnic Japanese students as well as Koreans. The school officially opened in 2004, marking a fresh start. The reason for the school's change in policy to accept Japanese students was that the school was experiencing financial difficulties.

Since then, the school has strengthened its linguistic education aiming for trilingual proficiency in Korean, English, and Japanese, enhancing its characteristics as an international school with the educational goal of fostering "true global citizens."

In 2024, it became the first international school in 107 years to win the National High School Baseball Championship.

== Features ==
While being an "Ichijo School" in Japan, it is also recognized as a "legitimate school" by the Republic of Korea, allowing students to obtain high school graduation qualifications from both Japan and South Korea.

As an "Ichijo School," the educational curriculum follows Japan's learning guidelines, and all classes are conducted in Japanese using approved textbooks, except for subjects in English and Korean taught by native speakers. students are enroled in Korean, English and Japanese language Classes.

It is noteworthy that the lyrics of the school song are in Korean, which is very rare for a Japanese "Ichijo School" and sometimes causes controversy and persecution. Regarding the school song sung at the 2024 Summer Koshien Tournament, Kyoto Prefecture asked the operator of the online bulletin board to delete four discriminatory posts that had been posted. The school song is problematic because its lyrics refer to the Sea of Japan as "동해" (Donghae, East Sea) or "東の海" (Higashi no umi, East Sea), a name that has become a political issue in both Japan and South Korea as the Sea of Japan naming dispute. Noritsugu Komaki, the manager of the baseball club, and Yuta Iwabuchi, who recruits students for the baseball club, propose changing the school song to something more contemporary, but their proposal is continually rejected by the school.

The all-school morning assembly is conducted in Korean, but students, especially those on the baseball club, reportedly do not understand Korean at all.

== Students ==
There are approximately 45 students per grade. The school has dormitories for students, and there are exchange students from all over the country.

In the spring of 2019, out of the graduates, 38 went on to Japanese universities or vocational schools, and 2 went to study at universities in Korea (1 to Korea University and 1 to Sookmyung Women's University).

As of March 2021, out of a total of 131 students in the entire school, there were 93 Japanese students and 37 Korean residents in Japan. Among the Japanese students, 40 were members of the baseball club.

As of July 2021, out of a total of 136 students, there were 69 female students and 67 male students, with 59 of the male students being members of the baseball club. All members of the baseball club were Japanese.

As of July 2024, 160 total students. circa of 30% of all school students has some type of connection with Korea. Of the 160 students, about 20 were middle school students and 140 were high school students. Of the high school students, 70 were male students, 61 of whom were on the baseball club. Most of them Japanese, and only one of the players in the Summer Koshien Tournament was Korean.

== Extracurricular activities ==
=== Baseball club ===
In the late 1990s, the school was in dire financial straits, with no more than two new students per year in some years, and needed a way out. Kim Anil, the vice principal, came up with the idea of starting a baseball club, taking a cue from Hidaka Natasu Branch School in Wakayama Prefecture, which had been in the spotlight after participating in the Spring Koshien tournament.

The high school's baseball club was officially founded in 1999, it was the first international school to compete in the Kyoto prefectural qualifying tournament for the Summer Koshien.

The baseball club rapidly strengthened after Noritsugu Komaki, a graduate of Kyoto Seishō High School, was appointed manager of the baseball club in 2008. His coaching method of devoting time to individual training was so successful that he was able to turn 11 students of this baseball club into Nippon Professional Baseball players from 2008 to 2024.

When Kaisei Sone, a member of the school's baseball club, began playing for the first team of the Fukuoka SoftBank Hawks of Nippon Professional Baseball team in 2017, the school began to attract promising baseball players from all over Japan, and the baseball club gained recognition from professional baseball teams.

Since 2021, they had been having great recent success, making consecutive appearances in the Spring and Summer Koshien tournaments, achieving its first Summer Koshien tournament victory in 2024, after a 2-1 final game with extra innings against Kanto Dai ichi.

== Notable alumni ==
From 2008 to 2024, eleven members of the school's baseball club became Nippon Professional Baseball players in Japan. These eleven were Shin Seong-hyun, Kaisei Sone, Rikuya Shimizu, Kyohei Ueno, Shinosuke Haya, Jui Tsuri, Hayato Nakagawa, Ryudai Morishita, Mirai Suhgihara, Taiki Hamada and Keishin Nagamizu.

Shin Seong-hyun became a professional baseball player in both the NPB and KBO Leagues, while Hwangmok Chi-seung (Naosuke Araki) played in the KBO League.

== See also ==
Japanese international schools in South Korea:

- Japanese School in Seoul
- Busan Japanese School
