= Korean Cultural Center, Tokyo =

Tokyo Korean Culture Center
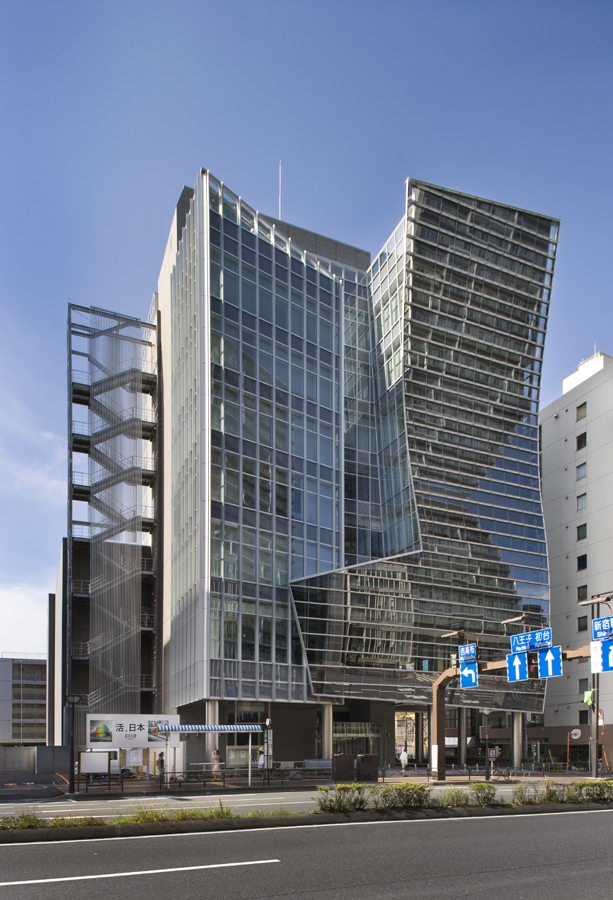
- Interactive map of the Tokyo Korean Culture Center area

General information
- Type: Cultural Center
- Location: Toshima, Tokyo, Japan
- Coordinates: 35.6874°N 139.7172°E
- Construction started: June, 2007
- Completed: 2009
- Client: South Korean Ministry of Culture, Sports and Tourism

Technical details
- Structural system: Seismic Isolated Structure
- Floor count: 8 Story structure and 1 Basement
- Floor area: 8,349 sq. meters

Design and construction
- Architecture firm: Samoo Architects & Engineers
- Other designers: Chosen Construction:Hanok Design/Construction, Nihon Sekkei, Park Hangsub

Website
- Main Official Website

The Tokyo Korean Cultural Center (駐日韓国大使館 韓国文化院; Korean: 주일본 대한민국 대사관 문화원) is a Korean Cultural Center in Toshima, Tokyo, Japan. Supported by the Korean Ministry of Culture, this center offers Korean Language classes and promotes Korean culture in Japan through educational, sporting, entertainment, art, and trade events and through the promotion of tourism. The Tokyo Korea Center is one of many Korean Cultural Centers in different countries.

== Activities ==
The Tokyo Korean Culture Center holds regular events and classes including: art fairs, dramas, movies, plays, cultural lectures, Korean music classes, Korean art classes, language classes, language exchange, and Korean language teacher training.

== Architecture ==
The design concept for the center’s curved facade was derived from the image of a dancer’s flowing robes performing the traditional Seungmu dance. The façade is made of dual-layered glass and aluminum curtains. Due to the high occurrence of seismic activity, the center is a Seismic Isolated Structure. Some of the programmed spaces include: a library, digital media library, art gallery, cinema and stage, lecture spaces, classrooms, performing arts spaces, a madang or outdoor activities space, garden, and traditional fermented foods outdoor demonstration area.

The fourth floor is designed and constructed to resemble a hanok. The floor, walls, and ceiling are constructed using traditional wood joinery techniques while the floors are heated using an ondol system. The hanok consists of two rooms: a sarangbang which is the reception room located near the exterior and a daecheong or main room. The sarangbang opens out onto the madang and garden. A traditional giwa, tiled, roof was constructed on the exterior facade of the hanok.

The garden and madang comprise over half of the fourth floor’s space. The madang is a large graveled area where outdoor activities and meeting can take place. It is separated from the smaller garden area by a short wall capped in traditional tiles. Included in the garden is a fermented foods display area. Glazed dark brown earthen jars, of various sizes, are placed atop a large rectangular display block.

== See also ==
- Korean Cultural Centers
- Earthquake engineering
- Seismic base isolation
- Traditional Korean roof construction
- Korean Wave
- Tokyo Korean School - The South Korean international school in Tokyo
