= Ibaraki =

Ibaraki may refer to any of the following places in Japan:

- Ibaraki Prefecture, one of the 47 prefectures of Japan
  - Ibaraki, Ibaraki, a town in Ibaraki Prefecture
  - Ibaraki Airport, an airport in Omitama, Ibaraki
- Ibaraki, Osaka, a city in Osaka Prefecture

It can also refer to:

- Ibaraki-dōji, an oni (demon or ogre) from Japanese legend
- Ibaraki, a kabuki play by Kawatake Mokuami
- Ibaraki (project), a side project of Trivium vocalist Matt Heafy
- Ibaraki (surname)
