= Toshihide Ibaraki =

Japanese computer scientist (born 1940)

Toshihide Ibaraki (Japanese: 茨木 俊秀, born 1940) is a Japanese computer scientist and operations researcher known for his research on graph algorithms, databases, resource allocation, fractional programming, and metaheuristics. He is a professor emeritus and former dean of informatics at Kyoto University, and the former president of The Kyoto College of Graduate Studies for Informatics.

== Education and career ==
Ibaraki studied engineering at Kyoto University, earning a bachelor's degree in 1963, master's degree in 1965, and doctorate in 1970.

He joined the Kyoto University faculty in 1969, taking a leave from 1983 to 1985 to work as a professor at the Toyohashi University of Technology. He eventually became dean of informatics at Kyoto University before retiring as professor emeritus. After retiring, in 2004, he became a professor at Kwansei Gakuin University. Next, he joined the Kyoto College of Graduate Studies for Informatics as a professor in 2009, and became the third president of the college in 2010, succeeding Toshiharu Hasegawa. He stepped down to become a professor and was succeeded as president by Shinji Tomita in 2023.

== Books ==
Ibaraki is the author or coauthor of books including:

- Resource Allocation Problems: Algorithmic Approaches (with Naoki Katoh, MIT Press, 1988)
- Algorithmic Aspects of Graph Connectivity (with Hiroshi Nagamochi, Cambridge University Press, 2008)

== Recognition ==
Ibaraki was listed as a Fellow of the Association for Computing Machinery in 1999, "for contributions to the theory and algorithms of discrete optimization, graphs and networks, and logical analysis of data with Boolean functions, as well as their applications". In 2000 he was named as a Fellow of the Information Processing Society of Japan, and of the Institute of Electronics, Information and Communication Engineers (IEICE) Engineering Sciences Society. He is also a Fellow of the Operations Research Society of Japan and of the Japanese Society for Applied Mathematics.

He was the 1970 recipient of the Yonezawa Prize of IEICE, and the 2001 recipient of the JAMS Prize of the International Society for Mathematical Sciences.

In 2004, the International Symposium on Discrete Algorithms and Optimization in Kyoto was held in honor of Ibaraki's retirement from Kyoto University. Selected papers from the conference were published in 2006 in a special issue of the journal Discrete Applied Mathematics, also dedicated to Ibaraki.
