= Kaisei Sone =

Japanese baseball player (born 1995)

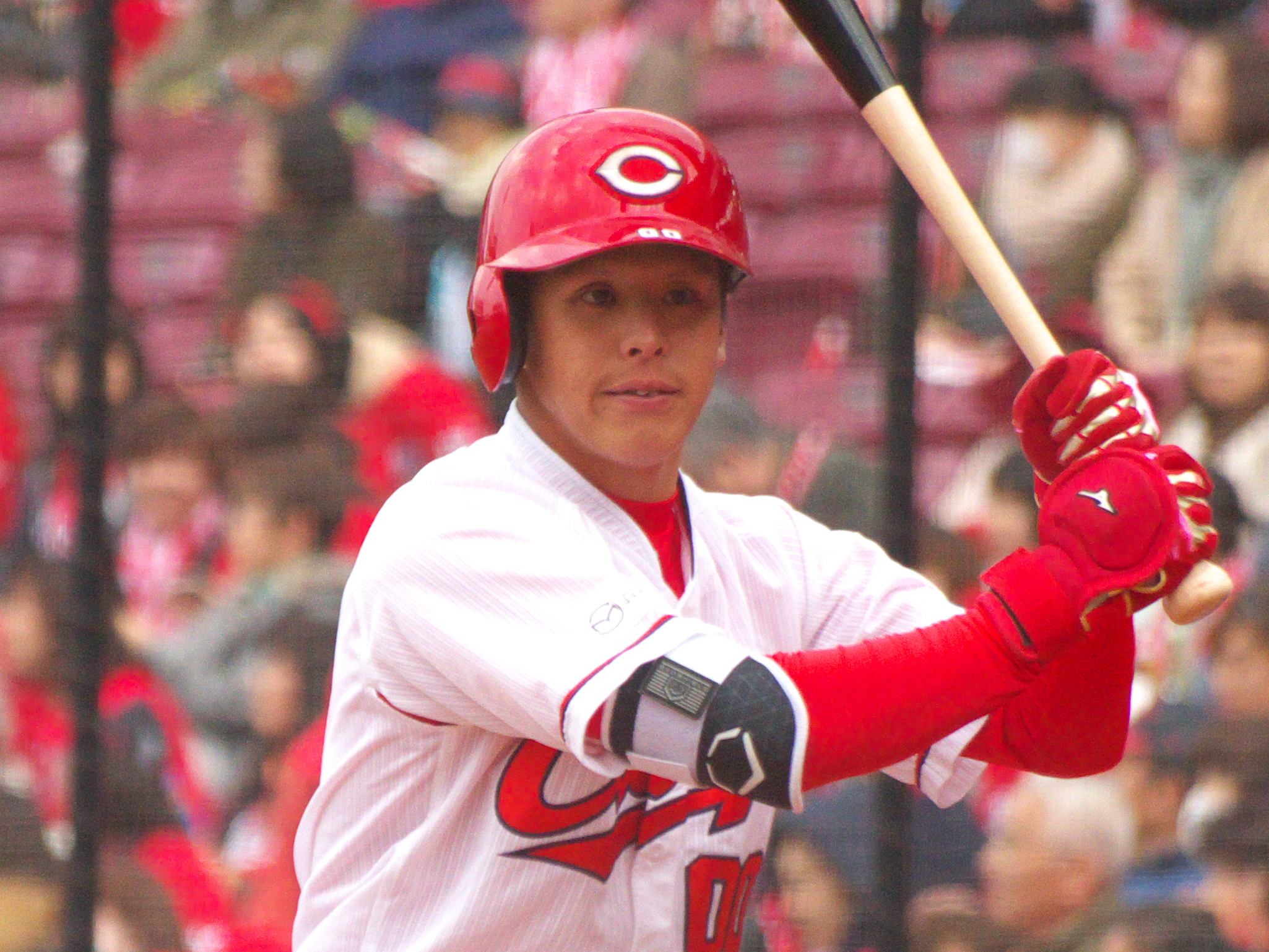
- Infielder
- Born: April 24, 1995 (age 30); Higashiyodogawa-ku, Osaka, Japan
- Batted: Left Threw: Right

NPB debut
- July 27, 2017, for the Fukuoka SoftBank Hawks

Last NPB appearance
- October 1, 2023, for the Hiroshima Toyo Carp

Career statistics (through 2023 season)
- Batting average: .184
- Home runs: 0
- Runs batted in: 5
- Stolen Bases: 25
- Stats at Baseball Reference

Teams
- Fukuoka SoftBank Hawks (2014–2018); Hiroshima Toyo Carp (2018–2024)

Kaisei Sone (曽根 海成, Sone Kaisei; born April 24, 1995) is a professional Japanese baseball player. He plays infielder for the Hiroshima Toyo Carp.
