= Tokyo Korean School =

International school in Japan

- 東京韓国学校 동경한국학교

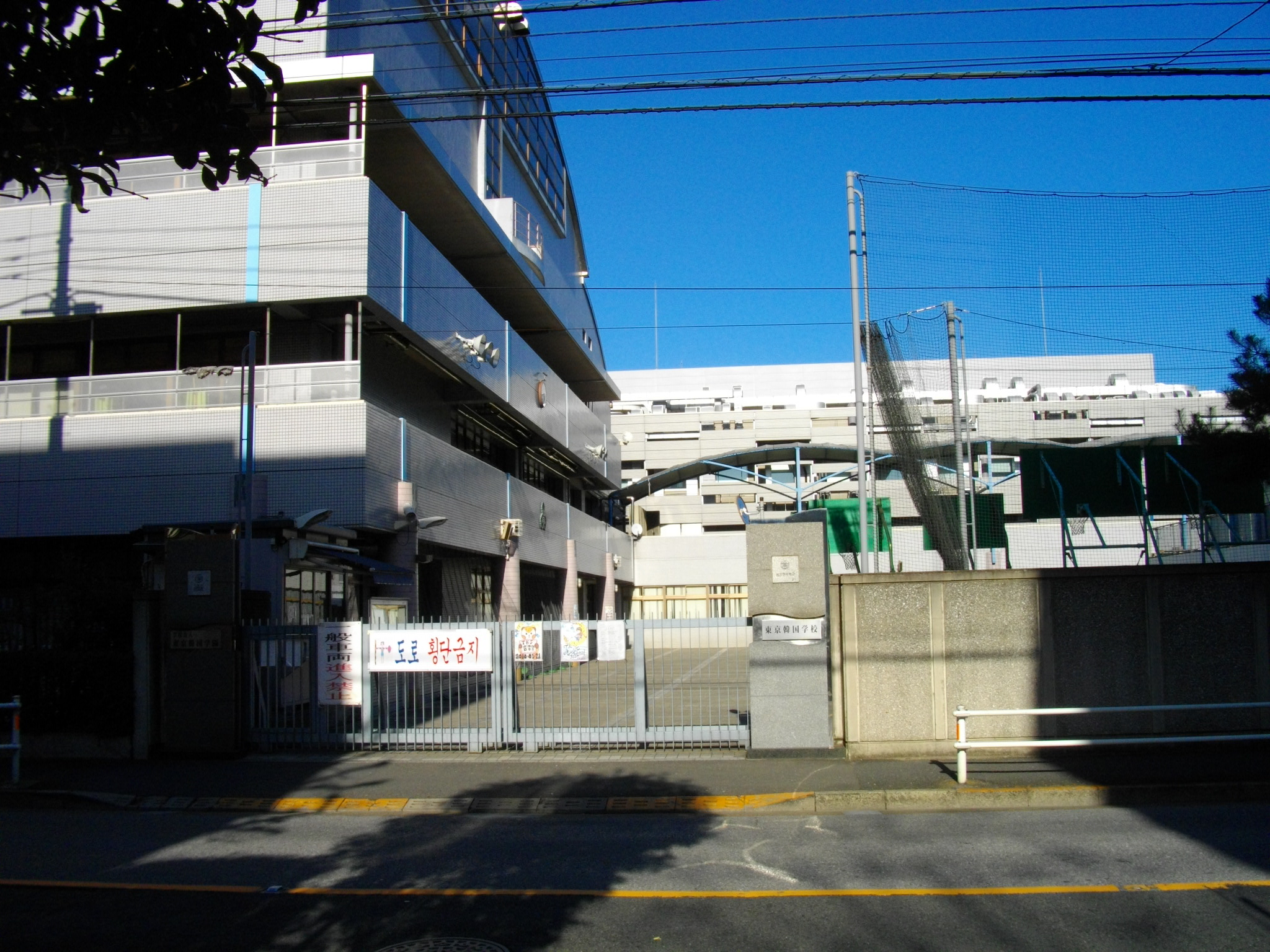

Location
- 2-1 Wakamatsuchō, Shinjuku-ku, Tōkyō-to 162–0056, 〒162-0056 東京都新宿区若松町2-1; 35°41′49″N 139°43′17″E

Information
- Type: Private Korean school
- Established: 26 April 1954; 72 years ago
- Grades: Elementary through high school
- Gender: Coeducational
- Language: Korean and Japanese
- Website: tokos.ed.jp

Tokyo Korean School

South Korean name
- Hangul: 동경한국학교
Transcriptions
- Revised Romanization: Donggyeong Hanguk Hakgyo
- McCune–Reischauer: Tonggyŏng Han'guk Hakkyo

Japanese name
- Kanji: 東京韓国学校
- Hiragana: とうきょうかんこくがっこう
Transcriptions
- Revised Hepburn: Tōkyō Kankoku Gakkō

Tokyo Korean School (Japanese: 東京韓国学校 Tōkyō Kankoku Gakkō, Korean: 동경한국학교, romanized: Donggyeong Hanguk Hakgyo) is a Korean school located in Wakamatsu-cho, Shinjuku-ku, Tokyo, Japan; catering to the Korean expatriate community and to Japanese-Koreans living in and around Tokyo. It was founded in 1954. It is affiliated with the South Korean government and Mindan (민단). It includes an elementary school, a middle school and a high school. The total population of the school is some 1,100 students. The primary language of instruction at the school is Korean; but there is an English language department and English library at the school. Japanese is also taught as a second language at the school. Educational essentialism is the main educational philosophy of teachers in both the Korean and English departments at the school.

== Student composition ==
Initially established as an educational institution for the children of Korean residents in Japan residing in Tokyo and its vicinity, over the years, the proportion of students from Korean residents in Japan has decreased due to the higher education levels in the Korean community in Japan and declining interest in ethnic education. Concurrently, an increase in the number of children from Korea who are expatriates, international students, and permanent residents due to Korea's economic growth and increased political and economic exchanges with Japan has been observed. However, in recent years, active promotional activities targeting the children of Korean residents in Japan, such as trilingual education (Japanese, Korean, English) in the elementary section and proactive public relations by the Association of Koreans in Japan and the school board, have contributed to a resurgence in the number of students from Korean residents in Japan. There are even instances where the number of applicants significantly exceeds the capacity, resulting in dozens of students waiting for admission in some grades.

As of 2013 the total number of students is 1,185, with 654 in elementary school, 288 in middle school, and 243 in high school. Approximately 30% of the students are children of temporary residents who return to Korea within a few years, such as those from Korean companies and embassy staff. The remaining 67% are children of special permanent residents, general permanent residents, settlers, and long-term residents. Some parents of students, including celebrities and chairpersons of major companies, also contribute to the school through donations.

Korean students from various parts of the world, including the United States and Europe, also attend the school. Due to the results of trilingual education, many students are considered to have a better command of English compared to the average Japanese student.

== Further education ==
After graduating from the high school section, a significant number of students go on to university. The majority of these students choose to study in Korea, while only a minority opt for Japanese universities. Among Japanese universities, Waseda University, Sophia University, and MARCH (a consortium of universities including Meiji University, Aoyama Gakuin University, Rikkyo University, Chuo University, and Hosei University) are popular choices for foreign student admissions, including students from this school.

== Faculty ==
Speaker Moon visits the Tokyo Korean School, 2019.

The number of faculty members is 80. The number of students from South Korean families fluctuates in accordance with the Korean economy's trends, impacting the composition of teachers (Korean residents in Japan, permanent residents, Korean government dispatch, etc.). With the increase in children of temporary residents, the initial characteristic of being a school primarily for Korean residents in Japan has diminished. However, the board of the school corporation continues to be primarily composed of Koreans residing in Japan.

== History ==
- 1954 – Opened in the building shared with the Association of Koreans in Japan Central Headquarters, initially with elementary and middle school sections
- 1955 – Approved as a "Various School"
- 1956 – Established the high school section
- 1962 – Officially recognized as a school by the Korean government
- 1991 – Completion of new school building
- 1993 – Saturday School (Korean Culture and Korean Language Class) established
- 2004 – Celebrated the 50th anniversary of its founding
- 2010 – Expansion of the elementary school building
- 2011 – Renovation of the elementary school library

== Notable alumni ==
- Cho Chikun, Go player
- Kim Sun-a, South Korean actress
- Kwon Ri-se, Korean-Japanese singer
- Hichori Morimoto, Korean-Japanese baseball player
- Wuno, South Korean rapper and brother of Zico
- Zico, South Korean rapper
- Penomeco, South Korean rapper

== See also ==
- List of high schools in Tokyo
- Tokyo Korean Culture Center – South Korean culture center in Tokyo

Japanese international schools in South Korea:

- Japanese School in Seoul
- Busan Japanese School
