= American–Japanese–Korean trilateral pact =

Japan–South Korea–US security partnership

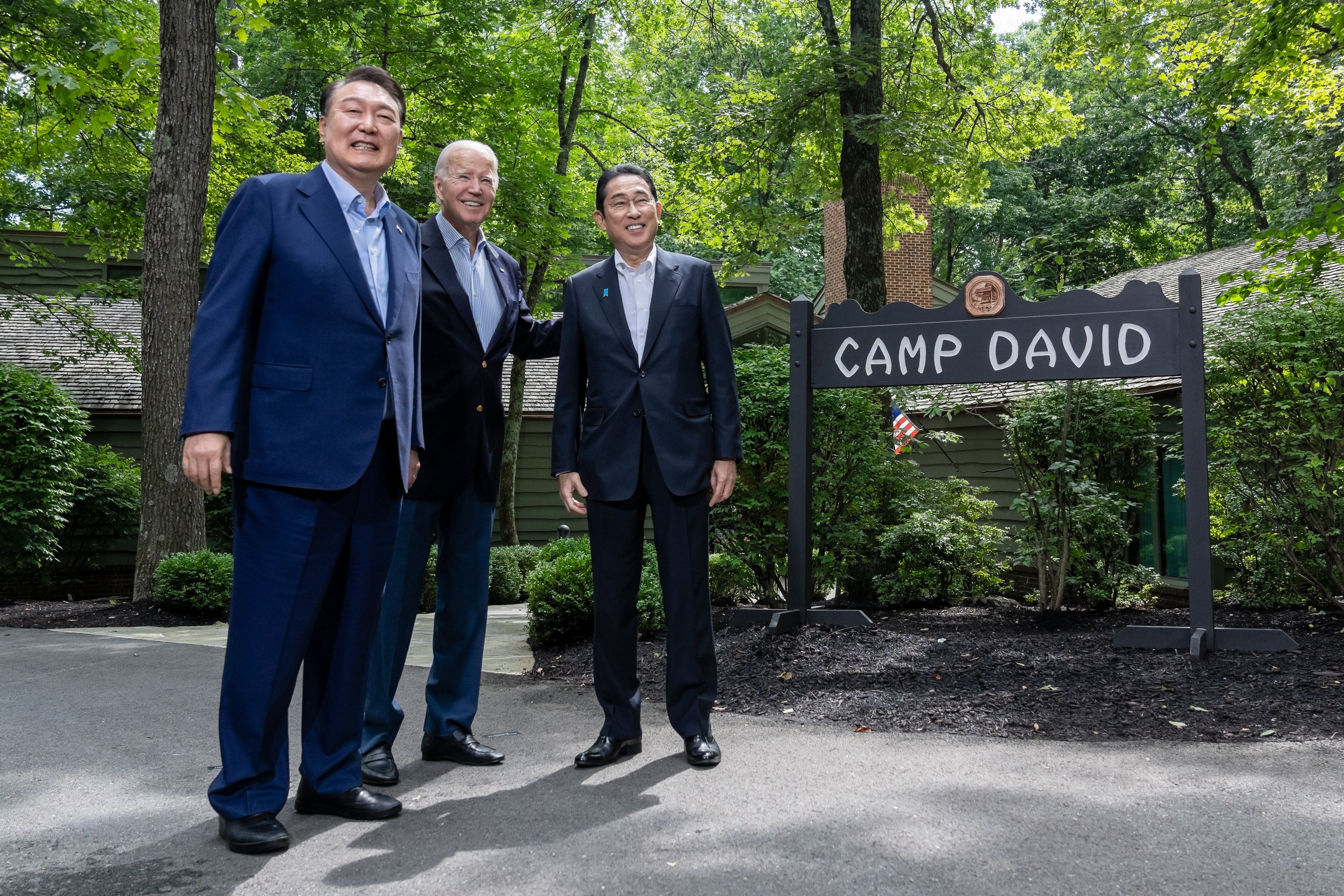
- From left to right: Yoon Suk Yeol, Joe Biden, and Fumio Kishida
- Formation: 18 August 2023; 3 years ago
- Type: Military alliance
- Purpose: Collective security
- Members: Japan; South Korea; United States

The American–Japanese–Korean trilateral pact or Camp David Principles is a security pact between Japan, South Korea, and the United States which was announced on August 18, 2023, at Camp David in the United States. The pact commits the three countries to a set of agreements and is one of the U.S.-led international security alliances, including Quad Plus and AUKUS.

== Background ==
=== Japan–South Korea relations ===
From 1910 to 1945, Korea was ruled by the Empire of Japan. Under Japanese rule, Korean women—primarily from South Korea—were forced into sexual slavery by the Imperial Japanese Army. Japan's rule of Korea has strained relations between the two countries. With the incoming administrations of South Korean president Yoon Suk Yeol and Japanese prime minister Fumio Kishida, both countries made significant amends. In March 2023, Yoon ended the South Korean government's requests to Japanese companies to pay Korean laborers enslaved during World War II. South Korea and Japan have supported Ukraine during the Russian invasion of Ukraine as China and Russia have furthered their relations.

The contemporary security relationship between South Korea and Japan demonstrates structural parallels to historical grievances, such as the colonial legacy and territorial disputes concerning Dokdo/Takeshima. These issues bear a resemblance to the residual tensions and ideological disparities observed later Russo-French Rapprochement of 1894. Both nations have engaged in limited security agreements, notably through mechanisms like the Annual Security Consultations and the General Security of Military Information Agreement (GSOMIA), primarily concentrating on intelligence sharing rather than the establishment of a comprehensive mutual defense pact.

=== Indo-Pacific threats ===
China's presence in the Indo-Pacific region has concerned the United States; relations between the two countries has remained low. In October 2022, North Korea fired a missile over Japan, followed by a nuclear threat to South Korea in March 2023. Through an agreement with the United States, Japan and South Korea have real-time information on North Korea's ballistic missiles.

In April 2023, U.S. President Joe Biden announced that any attacks against South Korea by North Korea would result in the "end" of Kim Jong Un's rule. At the White House, Yoon vowed to produce nuclear weapons. Japan declined to participate in a move attributed by the United States to domestic politics.

== Camp David summit ==
At Camp David on 18 August 2023, Biden announced the pact, marking the first time that international leaders visited the retreat since 2015, when then-president Barack Obama held a Gulf Cooperation Council summit there. The summit was the first time in Biden's presidency that journalists were allowed on Camp David's grounds.

== Implementation ==
The pact implements a formal casus foederis in which a threat to one member constitutes a threat against all, but does not mirror Article 5 of the North Atlantic Treaty; the response to an attack against one member must be discussed. The pact also improves trilateral ballistic missile defense and military exercises. The three countries will develop a security framework for the Indo-Pacific region.

The first Indo-Pacific Dialogue, building upon commitments made during the August 2023 Camp David summit, was held in Washington, D.C., on January 5, 2024. In a joint statement released by the US State Department, which described the dialogue mechanism (that will be hosted annually) as a new chapter in the trilateral relationship, Japan (represented by foreign ministry foreign policy bureau director-general Kobe Yasuhiro), Korea (represented by deputy minister for political affairs Chung Byung-won), and the US (represented by Assistant Secretary of State for East Asian and Pacific Affairs Daniel J. Kritenbrink) focused on discussing collaborating with Southeast Asian and Pacific Island countries and emphasized the need for regional economic security enhancement.

== See also ==
- Quadrilateral Security Dialogue
- AUKUS
- United States foreign policy toward the People's Republic of China
- Foreign policy of the Joe Biden administration
