= Japanese people in South Korea =

- (Japan) (South Korea)

Total population
- 70,375 (2025)

Regions with significant populations
- Seoul · Busan · Jeju

Languages
- Japanese · Korean

Related ethnic groups
- Japanese people

Japanese people in South Korea (Japanese: 在韓日本人, Hepburn: Zaikan Nihonjin) (Korean: 재한일본인; RR: Jaehan Ilbonin) are people of Japanese ethnicity residing or living in South Korea. They are usually categorized into two categories: those who retain Japanese nationality and are present in South Korea, and those who changed their nationality to South Korean (일본계 한국인, "Ilbongye Hangugin").

== History ==
The history of Japanese Koreans are usually divided into two different time periods.

=== Pre-colonial and colonial times (before 1945) ===
During Japanese rule in Korea, the peak of the Japanese population was 752,823, circa 1942.

== Notable people ==
=== Professors ===
- Hosaka Yuji (Originally from Tokyo, Japan)

=== Entertainers ===
- Ryohei Otani (Originally from Suita, Osaka, Japan)
- Sayuri Fujita (Originally from Shibuya-ku, Tokyo, Japan)

=== Singers ===
- Takuya Terada, former member of Cross Gene (Originally from Moriya, Ibaraki, Japan)
- Kangnam, former member of M.I.B. (Originally from Tokyo, Japan)
- Momo Hirai, Mina Myoui and Sana Minatozaki, members of Twice (Momo Hirai: Originally from Kyotanabe, Kyoto, Japan/Mina Myoui: Born in San Antonio, Texas, United States but raised in Nishinomiya, Hyōgo, Japan/Sana Minatozaki: Originally from Tennōji-ku, Osaka, Japan)
- Yuta Nakamoto and Shotaro Osaki, members of NCT (Yuta Nakamoto: Originally from Kadoma, Osaka, Japan/Shotaro Osaki: Originally from Zama, Kanagawa, Japan)
- Yuto Adachi, member of Pentagon (Originally from Nagano, Nagano, Japan)
- Nako Yabuki, former member of Iz*One and HKT48 (Originally from Tokyo, Japan)
- Hitomi Honda, member of Say My Name and former member of Iz*One and AKB48 (Originally from Tochigi, Japan)
- Sakura Miyawaki, member of Le Sserafim and former member of Iz*One (Originally from Kagoshima, Kagoshima, Japan)
- Kazuha Nakamura (Kazuha), member of Le Sserafim (Born in Kōchi, Kōchi, Japan but raised in Osaka, Japan)
- Amy Harvey, member of XG (Originally from Tokyo, Japan)
- Miyu Takeuchi, former member of Japanese girl group AKB48 (Originally from Tokyo, Japan)
- Kwon Ri-se, former member of Ladies' Code (Originally from Fukushima, Japan)
- Kokoro Kato (Kokoro), Rise Katsuno (Remi), and Mao Hirokawa (May), members of Cherry Bullet (Kokoro Kato (Kokoro): Originally from Nagoya, Aichi, Japan/Rise Katsuno (Remi) and Mao Hirokawa (May): Originally from Tokyo, Japan)
- Juri Takahashi, member of Rocket Punch and former member of AKB48 (Originally from Kashima, Ibaraki, Japan)
- Kenta Takada, member of JBJ95 and former member of JBJ (Originally from Takasaki, Gunma, Japan)
- Yoshinori Kanemoto (Yoshi), Asahi Hamada, and Haruto Watanabe, members of Treasure (Yoshinori Kanemoto (Yoshi): Originally from Kobe, Hyōgo, Japan/Asahi Hamada: Originally from Osaka, Japan/Haruto Watanabe: Originally from Fukuoka, Japan)
- Sora Sakata, member of Woo!ah! (Originally from Fukuoka, Japan)
- Riki Nishimura (Ni-ki), member of Enhypen (Originally from Okayama, Japan)
- Koyuki Mori (Yuki), member of Purple Kiss (Originally from Tokyo, Japan)
- Hina Nagai, member of Lightsum (Born in Kanagawa, Japan but raised in Tokyo, Japan)
- Sumire Aoyagi (Mire), member of Tri.be (Originally from Tokyo, Japan)
- Mizuki Ogawa (Léa), member of Secret Number (Originally from Tokyo, Japan)
- Keita Terazono, member of Ciipher (Originally from Osaka, Japan)
- Haruka Miyauchi (Miya), member of GWSN (Originally from Shizuoka, Japan)
- Yuku Amanuma, member of DKB (Originally from Saitama, Japan)
- Yuto Mizuguchi (U), member of ONF (Originally from Osaka, Japan)
- Yuuri Tokunaga, member of Lunarsolar (Originally from Fukuoka, Japan)
- Haku Shota (Soul), member of P1Harmony (Originally from Saitama, Saitama, Japan)
- Leo Hayase, Shota Nasukawa (Zero), Kairi Imai and Musashi Udo (Kio), members of T1419 (Leo Hayase, Shota Nasukawa (Zero) and Kairi Imai: Originally from Osaka, Japan/Musashi Udo (Kio): Originally from Kōchi, Kōchi, Japan)
- Rui Watanabe, model and former member of H.U.B.
- Rei Naoi, member of Ive (Originally from Anan, Tokushima, Japan)
- Shana Nonaka, member of Lapillus (Originally from Kōchi, Kōchi, Japan)
- Aeri Uchinaga (Giselle), member of aespa, (Born in Seoul, South Korea, but raised in Tokyo, Japan)
- Hokazono Iroha and Sakai Moka, members of illit (Sakai Moka: Born in Kitakyushu, Fukuoka, Japan. Hokazono Iroha: Born in Koganei, Tokyo, Japan)
- Kawai Ruka, member of BABYMONSTER and former member of Shibu3 project (Originally from Okayama, Japan)
- Enami Asa, member of BABYMONSTER (Originally from Tokyo, Japan)
- Sakamoto Mashiro, member of Madein and former member of Kep1er (Originally from Tokyo, Japan)
- Ezaki Hikaru, member of Kep1er (Originally from Fukuoka, Japan)
- Kato Haru, member of XLOV (Originally from Hyogo, Japan)
- Fukutomi Tsuki, member of Billlie and former member of MAGICOUR (Originally from Osaka, Japan)
- Ōsato Haruna, member of Billlie (Originally from Osaka, Japan)
- Tanaka Anna, member of MEOVV (Born in Toyama, Japan)
- Hoshizawa Miraku, member of NouerA (Originally from Tokyo, Japan)
- Katagiri Kurumi, member of Kiiras (Originally from Fukuoka, Japan)
- Mitsuyuki Amaru, member of KickFlip (Originally from Koto, Tokyo, Japan)
- Okamoto Keiju, member of KickFlip (Originally from Misato, Saitama, Japan)
- Takei Miku (Kumi), member of Baby DONT Cry (Originally from Saitama, Japan)
- Kunii Hinano (Mia), member of Baby DONT Cry (Originally from Hokkaido, Japan)
- Sasaki Ako, member of UNCHILD (Originally from Fukuoka, Japan)
- Maeda Riku, member of NCT and its Japanese sub-unit NCT WISH.
- Tokuno Yūshi (Yushi), member of NCT and its Japanese sub-unit NCT WISH. He is also a former member of EBiDAN and its sub-unit EDAMAME BEANS (Originally from Tokyo, Japan)
- Hirose Ryō (Ryo), member of NCT and its Japanese sub-unit NCT WISH (Originally from Kyoto, Japan)
- Fujinaga Sakuya, member of NCT and its Japanese sub-unit NCT WISH (Originally from Saitama, Japan)

=== Koreans of Japanese descent ===
- Kiggen
- Keisuke Kunimoto (Originally from Yokohama, Kanagawa, Japan)
- Lee Eun-ju (Originally from Shimonoseki, Yamaguchi, Japan)
- Shoo (Originally from Yokohama, Kanagawa, Japan)
- Woo Jang-choon (Originally from Akasaka, Minato-ku, Tokyo, Japan)
- Crown Princess Yi Bangja (Originally from Tokyo, Japan)
- Prince Yi Gu (Originally from Tokyo, Japan)

== Education ==
- Busan Japanese School
- Japanese School in Seoul
- Zainichi Koreans
