= Japanese School in Seoul =

International school in Seoul, South Korea

- ソウル日本人学校 서울일본인학교

Location
- New format address: 11 World Cup Buk-ro 62-gil Mapo-Gu, Seoul Korea 서울특별시 마포구 월드컵북로62길 11; Old format address: 1582 Sangam-dong, Mapo-gu, Seoul, South Korea 서울 마포구 상암동 1582 ソウル特別市麻浦区上岩洞1582; Seoul; South Korea
- Coordinates: 37.5837°N 126.8843°E

Information
- Type: Japanese international school
- Website: sjs.or.kr

The Japanese School in Seoul (ソウル日本人学校, Souru Nihonjin Gakkō, 서울일본인학교) is a Japanese international school located in the Sangam-dong neighborhood of Mapo District, Seoul, for the children of Japanese citizens residing in South Korea.

The Japanese School in Seoul was established on May 8, 1972, with a total of 33 kindergarten and primary school students. In 2005, it had grown to 403 students at kindergarten, primary and middle school levels. The Japanese School in Seoul is recognized by Japan's Ministry of Education as teaching a curriculum equivalent to schools for the same ages in Japan.

The Japanese School in Seoul moved to its current location in Digital Media City (DMC) in Mapo on September 27, 2010, from its former location in the Gaepo-dong neighborhood of Gangnam District.

== See also ==
- Education in Japan
- ソウル日本人学校園児襲撃事件/서울 일본인 학교 습격 사건 (Japanese School in Seoul kindergarten attack incident)

South Korean schools in Japan:

- Tokyo Korean School
- Educational Foundation Kyoto International School
- Baekdu Hagwon
- Korea International School
