= Busan Japanese School =

International school in South Korea

- Japanese: 釜山日本人学校; Korean: 부산일본인학교

Location
- 11 Millak-ro 19beon-gil, Suyeong-gu; Busan, 48285; South Korea; 35.1567°N 129.1219°E

Information
- Established: 1 October 1975; 51 years ago
- Language: Japanese
- Website: busanjs.com

Busan Japanese School (釜山日本人学校; Korean: 부산일본인학교), formerly known in English as Pusan Japanese School (PJS), is a Japanese international school in Suyeong District, Busan, South Korea, 12 kilometres (7.5 mi) from central Busan, and in proximity to Gwangalli Beach (a.k.a. Gwangan Beach). The Busan Japanese School is the Japanese overseas school that is physically closest to Japan itself.

It was established on October 1, 1975 (Showa 50).

In 2013 the school had 13 teachers teaching 47 students, with 38 in elementary school and nine in junior high school. By 2017 the student population was declining as Japanese companies sent fewer employees abroad in general and as the economy declined in Busan; Japanese companies by that time preferred assigning employees to Seoul.

== Culture ==
The school song was written Kiyoko Matsuo (松尾 清子, Matsuo Kiyoko), while Taku Izumi (いずみ たく, Izumi Taku) made the lyrics. Kohsuke Obane created an English translation of the song that was posted on the school's official website.
