= Akiko (given name) =

- Pronunciation: AH-kee-koh
- Gender: Female

Origin
- Origin: Japanese
- Meaning: Different meanings depending on the kanji used
- Region of origin: Japan

Other names
- Related names: Aki; Akihiko; Akira; Akinori

Akiko (あきこ, アキコ) is a feminine Japanese given name.

== Written forms ==
The kanji characters 晶 ("sparkle"), 明 ("bright"), and 秋 ("autumn") are three variations of ways to write "aki", and the character 子 is a common suffix in female given names in Japan. In Japanese the character 子 ("ko") means "child". The name can be written many different ways, and has different meanings depending on which kanji is used for "aki" (as well as the hiragana and katakana). Some variations of Akiko include:

- 亜妃子 ("Asia, queen, child")
- 安希子 ("peaceful, hope, child")
- 明子 ("bright, child")
- 充子 ("provide, child")
- 上子 ("superior, above, child")
- 暁子 ("dawn, child")

== Notable people ==
- Princess Akiko of Mikasa (彬子女王), member of the Japanese Imperial Family
- Akiko Abe (阿部 哲子; born 1978), Japanese announcer and actress
- Akiko Adachi (安達 阿記子; born 1983), Japanese goalball player
- Akiko Akasaka (赤坂 明子; born 1951), Japanese cross-country skier
- Akiko Akazome (赤染 晶子; 1974-2017), Japanese writer
- Akiko Aoyagi (born 1950), Japanese-American food writer and artist
- Akiko Aruga (有賀 秋子; born 1942), Japanese speed skater
- Akiko Ashizawa (芦澤 明子; born 1951), Japanese cinematographer and photographer
- Akiko Baba (馬場 あき子; born 1928), Japanese tanka poet and literary critic
- Akiko Chubachi (中鉢 明子; born 1982), Japanese Miss Universe Japan 2007
- Akiko Domoto (堂本 暁子; born 1932), former governor of Chiba Prefecture, Japan
- Akiko Ebi (海老 彰子; born 1953), Japanese-French pianist
- Akiko Fujimoto, Japanese-born American conductor
- Akiko Fukai (深井 晃子; born 1943), Japanese curator of fashion and textile arts
- Akiko Fukuda (福田 晶子; born 1937), Japanese long jumper
- Akiko Fukushima (福嶋 晃子; born 1973), Japanese professional golfer
- Akiko Furu (古 章子; born 1973), Japanese trampoline gymnast
- Akiko Futaba (二葉 あき子; 1915-2011), Japanese Ryūkōka singer
- Akiko Gono (郷野 晶子; born 1954 or 1955) Japanese trade unionist
- Akiko Gooden (born 1972) American former professional tennis player
- Akiko Hasegawa (長谷川 明子) Japanese voice actress and singer
- Akiko Hasegawa (長谷川 暁子; born 1985) Japanese volleyball player
- Akiko Hatanaka (畠中 亜希子; born 1975), Japanese ice hockey player
- Akiko Hatsu (波津 彬子; born 1959), Japanese manga artist
- Akiko Higashimura (東村 アキコ; born 1975), Japanese manga artist
- Akiko Hinagata (雛形あきこ; born 1978), Japanese actress, television talent, and former gravure idol
- Akiko Hiramatsu (平松 晶子; born 1967), Japanese voice actress
- Akiko Honda (本田 顕子; born 1971), Japanese politician
- Akiko Ichikawa (born 1967), Japanese transdisciplinary artist, editor and writer-activist
- Akiko Ikuina (生稲 晃子; born 1968), Japanese actress, singer, tarento, and politician
- Akiko Ino (井野 亜季子; born 1986), Japanese volleyball player
- Akiko Itoyama (絲山 秋子; born 1966), Japanese writer
- Akiko Iwamoto (岩本 亜希子; born 1978), Japanese rower who competed in the 2012 Summer Olympics
- Akiko Iwasaki (岩崎 明子; born 1970), Japanese Sterling Professor
- Akiko Kamei (亀井 亜紀子; born 1965), Japanese politician of the People's New Party, and a member of the Senate (Japan) in the Diet
- Akiko Kato (加藤 彰子; born 1988), Japanese field hockey player
- Akiko Kawarai (瓦井 昭子; born 1929), Japanese artist, jewellery designer, and composer
- Akiko Kawase (川瀬 晶子; born 1980), Japanese voice actress
- Akiko Kawase (川瀬 晶子; born 1971), Japanese former synchronized swimmer
- Akiko Kijimuta (雉子牟田 明子; born 1968), Japanese tennis player
- Akiko Kikuchi (菊池 亜希子; born 1982), Japanese model and actress
- Akiko Kinouchi (木内 晶子; born 1981), Japanese actress
- Akiko Kiso (木曽 明子; born 1936), Japanese classical scholar
- Akiko Kitada (喜多田 明子; born 1982), Japanese former field hockey player
- Akiko Kobayashi (chemist) (小林 昭子; born 1943), Japanese chemist
- Akiko Kobayashi (singer) (小林明子; born 1958), a Japanese singer, composer, arranger, and songwriter
- Akiko Kobayashi (voice actress) (小林 晃子; born 1979), voice actress and singer from Japan
- Akiko Koike (小池 亜希子; born 1969), Japanese voice actress
- Akiko Kojima (児島 明子; born 1936), Japanese actress and the first Miss Universe to come from Asia
- Akiko Koyama (小山 明子; born 1935), Japanese actress
- Akiko Kuji (久慈 暁子; born 1994), Japanese actress, announcer, model, and television personality
- Akiko Kumai (熊井 明子; 1940–2024), Japanese writer and researcher focusing on potpourri
- Akiko Kurabayashi (倉林 明子; born 1960), Japanese writer and researcher focusing on potpourri
- Akiko Matsumoto (松本 明子; born 1966), Japanese television personality and actress
- Akiko Matsuo (松尾 亜紀子; born 1964), Japanese engineer
- Akiko Matsuura, singer and drummer from Osaka, Japan who plays for the British bands; The Big Pink, Comanechi, and Pre
- Akiko Miyajima (宮島 秋子; born 1966), Japanese javelin thrower
- Akiko Miyamura (宮村 亜貴子; born 1974), Japanese badminton player
- Akiko Monō (桃生 亜希子; born 1976), an actress and model from Japan
- Akiko Morigami (森上 亜希子; born 1980), Japanese tennis player
- Akiko Morishima (森島 明子; born 1973), Japanese yuri and shōjo manga writer and artist
- Akiko Motofuji (元藤 燁子; 1928–2003), Japanese dancer and dancing teacher
- Akiko Nagashima (長嶋 亜希子; 1943-2007), Japanese businesswoman and the wife of Shigeo Nagashima
- Akiko Naka (仲 晶子; born 1980), Japanese ice hockey player
- Akiko Nakagami (中上 晶子), Japanese popular expert on family therapy and a business entrepreneur
- Akiko Nakagawa (中川 亜紀子; born 1973), Japanese voice actress
- Akiko Nakakura (中倉 彰子; born 1977), Japanese shogi player
- Akiko Nakamura (中村晃子), Japanese singer and actress
- Akiko Nishina (仁科 亜希子; born 1953), Japanese actress
- Akiko Niwata (庭田 亜樹子; born 1984), Japanese women's footballer
- Akiko Noma (野間 亜紀子; born 1980), Japanese bassist, back-up vocalist, and lyricist
- Akiko Ōishi (大石 晃子; born 1977), Japanese politician
- Akiko Okamoto (岡本章子; born 1964), Japanese politician
- Akiko Ōku (大九 明子; born 1968), Japanese film director and screenwriter
- Akiko Omae (大前 綾希子; born 1993), Japanese former professional tennis player
- Akiko Santō (山東 昭子; born 1942), Japanese politician
- Akiko Sato (佐藤 明子; born 1984), Japanese sports shooter
- Akiko Seki (関 鑑子; 1899–1973), Japanese soprano
- Akiko Sekine (関根 明子; born 1975), Japanese athlete
- Akiko Sekiwa (関和 章子; born 1978), Japanese curler and curling coach
- Akiko Shiga (志賀 暁子; 1910–1990), Japanese actress
- Akiko Shikata (志方 あきこ), Japanese composer and singer-songwriter
- Akiko Solon (born 1994) Filipino singer and actress
- Akiko Stehrenberger (born 1978), American designer
- Akiko Sudo (須藤 安紀子; born 1984), Japanese football player
- Akiko Sugimoto (杉本 章子; 1953–2015), Japanese novelist
- Akiko Sugino (杉野 明子; born 1990), Japanese para-badminton player
- Akiko Sugiyama, Palauan politician
- Akiko Suwanai (諏訪内 晶子; born 1972), Japanese classical violinist
- Akiko Suzuki (鈴木 明子; born 1985), Japanese figure skater
- Akiko Takeda (born 1979), Japanese international table tennis player
- Akiko Takojima (蛸島 彰子; born 1946), Japanese professional shogi player
- Akiko Tanigawa (谷川 章子; born 1977), Japanese female professional ten-pin bowler
- Akiko Tatsumi (巽 明子; born 1979), known as Suara, Japanese singer
- Akiko Thomson (born 1974), Filipina television host, journalist and retired swimmer
- Akiko Toda (戸田 亜紀子; born 1973), Japanese voice actress
- Akiko Tsuruga (敦賀 明子), jazz keyboard musician, composer, organist, and pianist from Osaka
- Akiko Urasaki (浦崎 亜希子; born 1986), Japanese hip hop artist
- Akiko Wada (和田 アキ子; born 1950), singer and television tarento from Ikuno-ku
- Akiko Wakabayashi (若林 映子; born 1939), Japanese actress best known for her role as the Bond girl Aki in the 1967 James Bond film You Only Live Twice
- Akiko Yada (矢田 亜希子; born 1978), an actress from Kawasaki, Japan
- Akiko Yagi (八木 秋子; 1895–1983), Japanese anarchist writer and activist
- Akiko Yagi (八木 亜希子; born 1965), Japanese free announcer, tarento, television presenter, newscaster, and actress
- Akiko Yajima (矢島 晶子; born 1967), voice actress from Kashiwazaki, Japan
- Akiko Yamanaka (山中 あき子; born 1945), Japanese politician
- Akiko Yano (矢野 顕子; born 1955), a Japanese singer and pop/jazz musician
- Akiko Yazawa (矢澤 亜希子; born 1980), backgammon player
- Akiko Yonemura (米村 明子; born 1984), Japanese former professional tennis player
- Akiko Yosano (与謝野 晶子; 1878-1942), Japanese poet, feminist and social reformer of late 19th-early 20th century Japan
- Akiko Yoshida (吉田 亜紀子, born 1976), Japanese pop singer better known under her stagename KOKIA
- Akiko Yoshise (吉瀬 章子; born 1962), Japanese operations researcher and a professor
- Empress Shōshi, former Empress of Japan, who was also known as Akiko

== Fictional characters ==
- Aki, a female ninja and Japanese agent played by Akiko Wakabayashi in the 1967 James Bond film, You Only Live Twice. Wakabayashi convinced director Lewis Gilbert to change the name of her character to one closer to her own
- Akiko Bloom, a character in CutiePieMarzia (Marzia Bisognin)'s novel Dream House
- Akiko Hiroguchi, a girl born with fur in the 1985 Kurt Vonnegut novel Galápagos
- Akiko Minase (水瀬 秋子), a supporting character in the anime, visual novel, and manga series Kanon
- Akiko Narumi (鳴海 亜樹子), a character in the tokusatsu drama series Kamen Rider W
- Akiko Yosano, a character in Bungo Stray Dogs
- Akiko Yoshida (あきこ・ヨシダ), a character in American Dad!
