= Matsuo (name) =

Matsuo (written: 松尾) is a Japanese surname. Notable people with the name include:

- Akiko Matsuo (松尾 亜紀子; born 1964), Japanese engineer
- Atsushi Matsuo (松尾 篤; born 1990), Japanese footballer
- Ayumu Matsuo (松尾 歩; born 1980), Japanese shogi player
- Bashō Matsuo (松尾 芭蕉; 1644–1694), Japanese Edo period poet
- Erika Matsuo (松尾 依里佳; born 1984), Japanese violinist
- Genta Matsuo (松尾 元太; born 1986), Japanese footballer
- Ginzō Matsuo (松尾 銀三; 1951–2001), Japanese voice actor
- Hayato Matsuo (松尾 早人; born 1965), Japanese composer
- Kaoru Matsuo (松尾 薫; born 1951), Japanese sport shooter
- Katsuhiro Matsuo (松尾勝博; born 1964), Japanese rugby union player
- Kayo Matsuo (松尾 嘉代; born 1943), Japanese actress
- Kazumi Matsuo (松尾 和美; born 1974), Japanese female marathon runner
- Keisuke Matsuo (松尾 景輔; 1890–1943), Japanese naval officer
- Kinoaki Matsuo (松尾 樹明), Japanese naval officer
- Kosuke Matsuo (born 1930), Japanese rower
- Luisa Matsuo (born 1988), Brazilian gymnast
- Naoto Matsuo (松尾 直人; born 1979), Japanese footballer
- Remi Matsuo (松尾 レミ; born 1991), Japanese musician
- Satoru Matsuo (松尾 諭; born 1975), Japanese actor
- Seijiro Matsuo (松尾 誠次郎), the second president of the Dojin-kai
- Shigeyoshi Matsuo (松尾 臣善; 1843–1916), Japanese banker and businessman
- Shinji Matsuo (松尾 慎治), Japanese engineer
- Shizuka Matsuo (松尾 静香; born 1986), Japanese female badminton player
- Suzuki Matsuo (松尾 スズキ; born 1962), Japanese director
- Taiga Matsuo (松尾 大河; born 1998)), Japanese baseball player
- Takashi Matsuo (disambiguation)
- Tomomi Matsuo (born 1968), Japanese badminton player
- Toshiko Matsuo (松尾トシ子; 1907–1993), Japanese politician
- Yuji Matsuo (松尾 雄治; born 1954), Japanese rugby union player
- Yukimi Matsuo (松尾 幸実; born 1987), Japanese beauty pageant
- Yusuke Matsuo (松尾 佑介; born 1997), Japanese footballer

Matsuo (written: 松夫, 松男) is a masculine Japanese given name. Notable people with the name include:

- Matsuo Azuma (東 松生; born 1965), Japanese fencer
- Matsuo Fujimoto (藤本 松夫; 1922–1962), Japanese murderer
- Matsuo Kishi (岸松雄; 1906–1985), Japanese film critic
- Matsuo Morizumi (森住 松雄; 1891–1945), Japanese naval admiral
- Matsuo Sugano (菅野 松男; born 1939), Japanese astronomer
- Matsuo Yokoyama (横山 松夫; born 1927), former president of Walt Disney Enterprises of Japan

== See also ==
- Mutsuo
