= Shiga (surname) =

Shiga (written: 志賀) is a Japanese surname. Notable people with the surname include:

- Akane Shiga (志賀 紅音, born 2001), Japanese ice hockey player
- Akiko Shiga (志賀 暁子, 1910–1990), Japanese actress
- Aoi Shiga (志賀 葵, born 1999), Japanese ice hockey player
- Daisuke Shiga (志賀 太祐, born 1976), better known as Tochiazuma Daisuke, Japanese sumo wrestler
- Jason Shiga (born 1976), American cartoonist
- Kiyoshi Shiga (志賀 潔, 1871–1957), Japanese physician and bacteriologist
- Mariko Shiga (志賀 真理子, 1969–1989), Japanese idol and voice actress
- Masashi Shiga (志賀 政司, born 1939), Japanese basketball player
- May Shiga Hornback (1924–1976), American nurse and nursing educator
- Naoya Shiga (志賀 直哉, 1883–1971), Japanese writer
- Yoshihiro Shiga (志賀 良弘, born 1956), Japanese handball player
