= Shiga (disambiguation) =

Shiga Prefecture is a prefecture of Japan.

Shiga may also refer to:

== Places ==
- Shiga District, Shiga, a former district of Shiga Prefecture
- Shiga, Shiga, a former town of Shiga Prefecture
- Shiga Kōgen, a highland of Nagano Prefecture, Japan

== Other uses ==
- Shiga (surname), a Japanese surname
- Shiga toxin, a biological toxin

== See also ==
- Shiga Lin, a singer and actress from Hong Kong
- Shigashi (Lady Shiga), a Japanese noble lady and warrior
