= Akiko =

Akiko can refer to:

- Akiko (comic book), an American comic book
- Akiko (film), a 1961 Italian comedy film
- Akiko (Amiga), a custom chip used in the Amiga CD32 games console
- Akiko (given name), a common Japanese female given name
