= Kazushige Nagashima =

Japanese baseball player, actor, and sports commentator

- Infielder
- Born: January 26, 1966 (age 59); Ohta, Tokyo, Japan
- Batted: Right Threw: Right

NPB debut
- April 9, 1988, for the Yakult Swallows

Last NPB appearance
- May 28, 1996, for the Yomiuri Giants

NPB statistics
- Batting average: .210
- Hits: 161
- Home runs: 18
- Runs batted in: 82
- Stolen bases: 8

Teams
- Yakult Swallows (1988 – 1992); Yomiuri Giants (1993 – 1996)

Kazushige Nagashima (長嶋 一茂, Nagashima Kazushige; born January 26, 1966) is a Japanese tarento, sports commentator and former professional baseball player. His father is Japanese baseball legend Shigeo Nagashima.

== Biography ==
Nagashima was born in Tokyo, Japan, the oldest son of former Japanese national team manager Shigeo Nagashima and his wife Akiko. His brother, Masaoki, is a race car driver, and his sister, Mina, is a newscaster. Nagashima's wife is his business manager, and they have twin daughters.

== Professional career ==
Nagashima entered Rikkyo University, following his father, and attracted much attention from professional scouts, being the son of Shigeo Nagashima. He was drafted in the first round of the 1988 draft by the Yakult Swallows, and his first professional hit was a home run against the Yomiuri Giants, and the pitcher was Bill Gullickson. He was touted as the next big star in Japanese baseball, after his father, but failed to live up to expectations. Nagashima did not hit or field well, and his playing time decreased as the years went on. In 1992, he spent a year with the Los Angeles Dodgers single-A team in the United States, but made little improvement.

He was about to be released from the Swallows in 1992, but was traded for money to the Yomiuri Giants, where his father was the manager. He did not play any better with the Giants, but his team won the league championship in 1994, and the father-son combination became a pet topic of the Japanese media. Nagashima suffered various injuries to his wrists and ankles during this period, and in 1993, he went to the U.S. to undergo surgery.

Nagashima's baseball career ended in 1996. The team demoted him to the minor leagues, along with a fine and a suspension, when he insulted coach Shozo Doi after he was told to practice bunting. Nagashima explained that he had no intention of insulting Doi, but pressure from the team and his own frustration increased when he yelled at Doi for telling him to bunt. Giants owner Tsuneo Watanabe was upset, and manager Shigeo Nagashima was forced to tell his son that he would not be offered a contract for next year. Several teams showed interest in signing Nagashima, but he announced his retirement, ending his nine-year career in the professional leagues.

Nagashima had poor relationships with many managers and coaches throughout his career. Former Yomiuri Giants manager Tsuneo Horiuchi and former Yakult Swallows manager Katsuya Nomura had particular problems with Nagashima. Horiuchi (a pitching coach while Nagashima was on the Giants) was irritated at Nagashima, who probably spent more time partying than taking batting practice. Nomura criticized Nagashima when he was cut from the Giants, since he was the only player that never took notes when Nomura held daily meetings with the team during spring training.

== Post-retirement ==
Nagashima became a sportscaster after retiring, hosting several sports shows from 1997 to 2002. He appeared on an NHK drama series in 2000, and has starred in several movies since then. His acting is thought to be somewhat better than his ability on the baseball field.

Among his drama appearances was the role of Motorbike Cop Ken Nakajima in You're under arrest(Japanese – Taiho Shichauzo)in 2003. This drama was based on a long-running anime series of the same name. In the anime Ken Nakajima is a lovable but slightly oafish character. Nagashima's somewhat broad acting style perfectly suits this role.

He has also appeared as a commentator for K-1 broadcasts, owing to his experience with Kyokushin Karate. He was knocked unconscious when he was put into a mock matchup with former K-1 World Max champion Masato on a television show.

He also appears regularly on a quiz game show, and on other variety television shows. He is in several television commercials, including one when he appears alongside his father.

At the beginning of 2005, he was made the Yomiuri Giants special advisor, and the Yomiuri Shimbun sports advisor. He was given the position with a recommendation from Yomiuri Giants owner Tsuneo Watanabe, showing that the rift between him and his former team has healed over time. This is one of the only instances where a mediocre baseball player was given a high position in the Yomiuri organization. He also ran the first Japanese leg of the 2004 Summer Olympics torch relay.

Nagashima played the voice of "Kōichi", father of the human protagonist in Studio Ghibli's 2008 animated film Ponyo on the Cliff by the Sea.
