= Tatsuo Kamon =

Japanese singer-songwriter (born 1959)

Tatsuo Kamon 嘉門 達夫
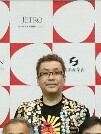

Background information
- Born: Tatsuo Torikai 鳥飼 達夫; 25 March 1959 (age 67)
- Origin: Japan
- Genres: Kayōkyoku, novelty song
- Occupation: Singer-songwriter
- Instruments: Vocal, guitar
- Years active: 1975–1980 (rakugoka); 1983–present
- Labels: Nippon Columbia; Victor Music; Daipro-X
- Website: daipro-x.co.jp/kamon/

Tatsuo Kamon (嘉門 達夫, Kamon Tatsuo), real name Tatsuo Torikai (鳥飼 達夫, Torikai Tatsuo), is a Japanese singer-songwriter born 25 March 1959 in Ibaraki, Osaka Prefecture, Japan. He is represented by the talent management firm Daikan'yama Production, and releases works through Daipro-X, a record company which is a subsidiary of Daikan'yama.

He made his professional singer-songwriter debut in 1983 by winning two major awards and being named the "Rookie of the Year" for his single Yankee no Niichan no Uta (ヤンキーの兄ちゃんのうた, Yankī no Niichan no Uta).

== Biography ==
Kamon was born as Tatsuo Torikai on 25 March 1959 in Ibaraki, Osaka Prefecture, Japan. He graduated from Chūjō Elementary School and Yōsei Junior High, both part of the Ibaraki municipal school system. While attending Osaka Prefectural Kasugaoka High School, he began studying as an apprentice to rakugo master Tsuruko Shōfukutei beginning in 1975. After graduating, he became a regular guest on the MBS Young Town radio program from April 1978 until September 1980. He also co-hosted the show with Naoko Kawai from July 1984 to September 1992.

In 1981, after meeting Keisuke Kuwata of the Southern All Stars, he changed his name to "Kamon" from "Torikai" in honor of Kuwata's pseudonym of Yūzō Kamon. Kamon made his professional debut as a recording artist on 21 July 1983 with the release of his single Yankee no Niichan no Uta. He won both the Yomiuri TV Cable Broadcast First Prize and the TBS Cable Broadcast First Prize and was named Rookie of the Year for this release.

Kaeuta Medley, a single released in 1991, sold over 820,000 copies and was Kamon's first big hit. In 2000, Kamon changed to his current "trademark" look by bleaching his hair.

Kamon married for the first time on 15 January 2009.

== Discography ==
=== Singles ===
	Single title	Japanese	Release date	Lyrics	Composition	Arrangement	Notes
1	"Kekkon Shiyō yo"	結婚しようよ	21 September 1989	Tatsuo Kamon; Takuro Yoshida	Takuro Yoshida; Tatsuo Kamon	Takashi Kudō	VDRS-10004 (CD), VST-10559 (cassette)
2	"Tarirarirān Rock 'n' Roll"	タリラリラーンロックンロール	1 February 1990	Tatsuo Kamon	Tatsuo Kamon	Takashi Kudō	VIDL-10001 (CD), VISL-2 (cassette)
3	"Futamata"		21 March 1990	Tatsuo Kamon; Zenjirō	Tatsuo Kamon	Takashi Kudō	VIDL-10018 (CD), VISL-20 (cassette)
4	"Katte ni Sinbad"	勝手にシンドバッド	4 July 1990	Keisuke Kuwata; Tatsuo Kamon	Keisuke Kuwata; Tatsuo Kamon	Takashi Kudō	VIDL-10041 (CD), VISL-46 (cassette); Reached No. 89 on Oricon chart, on the chart for one week
5	"Yatte Miso!"	やってミソ！	21 October 1990	Tatsuo Kamon	Tatsuo Kamon	Ryō Yonemitsu; Mother Goose	VIDL-36 (CD), VISL-74 (cassette) used in a commercial for Calbee Spicy Miso Sauce flavored Potato Chips used in a commercial for JFE Shoji Trade Corporation
6	"Karaoke No. 1"	カラオケNo. 1	21 February 1991	Tatsuo Kamon	Tatsuo Kamon	Takashi Kudō	VIDL-10098 (CD), VISL-104 (cassette) with Satomi Harada
7	"Kaeuta Medley"	替え唄メドレー	21 May 1991	Tatsuo Kamon	Tatsuo Kamon	Ichirō Nitta; Yukihiro Matsubara	VIDL-10130 (CD), VISL-137 (cassette); Reached No. 9 on Oricon chart, on the chart for 32 weeks
8	"Kaeuta Medley 2"	替え唄メドレー2	21 September 1991	Tatsuo Kamon; Yukihiro Masuno	Tatsuo Kamon	Ichirō Nitta; Takashi Kudō	VIDL-10158 (CD), VISL-165 (cassette); Reached No. 4 on Oricon chart, on the chart for 22 weeks
9	"Kaeuta Medley 3"	替え唄メドレー3	21 September 1991	Tatsuo Kamon; Radio Comedy Allstars	Tatsuo Kamon; Takashi Kudō	Ichirō Nitta; Takashi Kudō	VIDL-10197 (CD), VISL-189 (cassette); Reached No. 3 on Oricon chart, on the chart for 13 weeks
10	"Hana kara Gyūnyū"	鼻から牛乳	21 April 1992	Tatsuo Kamon	Tatsuo Kamon	Takashi Kudō; Ichirō Nitta	VIDL-10228 (CD), VISL-215 (cassette); Reached No. 8 on Oricon chart, on the chart for 10 weeks
11	"Hana kara Gyūnyū Dai-2-shō"	鼻から牛乳－第2章－	22 July 1992	Tatsuo Kamon	Tatsuo Kamon	Takashi Kudō; Ichirō Nitta	VIDL-10264 (CD), VISL-243 (cassette); Reached No. 12 on Oricon chart, on the chart for 9 weeks
12	"Duet Kaeuta Medley"	デュエット替え唄メドレー	5 December 1992	Tatsuo Kamon	Tatsuo Kamon	Takashi Kudō; Hiroshi Takada	VIDL-10295 (CD), VISL-260 (cassette), with Miyoko Asada; Reached No. 28 on Oricon chart, on the chart for 8 weeks
13	"Go! Go! Schoolmates"	Go! Go! スクールメイツ	24 March 1993	Yoshii; Tatsuo Kamon	Tatsuo Kamon; Ichirō Nitta	Ichirō Nitta; Jun'ichi Kanazaki	VIDL-10318 (CD), VISL-264 (cassette) used in commercial for "Shinken Seminar Junior High Course"; Reached No. 24 on Oricon chart, on the chart for 4 weeks
14	"Nippon no Sazae-san"	NIPPONのサザエさん	21 July 1993	Tatsuo Kamon	Tatsuo Kamon	Tatsuo Kamon; Daimyō Gyōretsu	VIDL-10368 (CD), VISL-10089 (cassette) used in commercial for UHA Mikakutō "Nagai Kajitsu"; Reached No. 48 on Oricon chart, on the chart for 5 weeks
15	"Smokin' Boogie Ladies"	スモーキン・ブギ レディース	1 January 1994	Takeshi Arai; Tatsuo Kamon	Ryudo Uzaki	Takashi Kudō	VIDL-10458 (CD); Reached No. 86 on Oricon chart, on the chart for 3 weeks
16	"Murphy's Law"	マーフィーの法則	2 February 1994	Price Sterm Sloan, In; Tatsuo Kamon	Tatsuo Kamon	Hayato Kanbayashi	VIDL-10487 (CD); Reached No. 69 on Oricon chart, on the chart for 3 weeks
17	"Kimi ga Ita Kisetsu"	君がいた季節	2 March 1994	Tomoyuki Michiyama	Kazuo Zaitsu	Mitsuo Hagita	VIDL-10489 (CD); Reached No. 64 on Oricon chart, on the chart for 2 weeks
