= Akiko Nagashima =

Japanese businessperson (1943–2007)

- 長嶋 亜希子
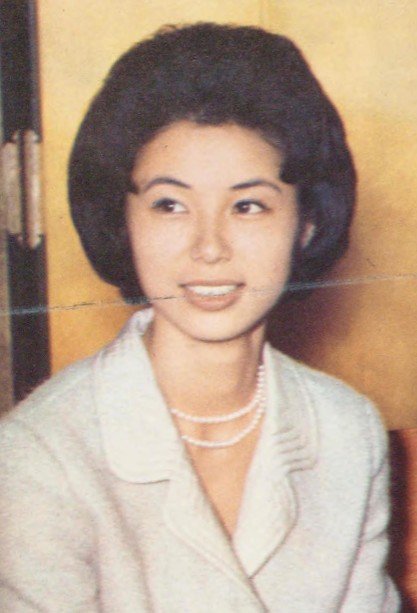
- Nagashima in the January 1965 issue of Fujin Seikatsu
- Born: Akiko Nishimura; January 5, 1943; Shibuya, Tokyo, Japan
- Died: September 18, 2007 (aged 64); Tokyo, Japan
- Resting place: Hawaii, U.S.
- Education: College of Saint Teresa
- Occupation: Businesswoman
- Title: Representative director, Office N Co., Ltd.
- Spouse: Shigeo Nagashima (m. 1965–2007)

Akiko Nagashima (長嶋亜希子, Akiko Nagashima; née Nishimura; January 5, 1943 – September 18, 2007) was a Japanese businesswoman and the wife of former Yomiuri Giants star Shigeo Nagashima. She served as the representative director of Nagashima's personal office, Office N Co., Ltd.

== Early life, education, and family ==
Akiko Nishimura was born in Shibuya, Tokyo (her parents' registered domicile was Kagoshima Prefecture). Her grandfather, Nishimura Tatsugoro, ran the publishing company Toundo Bookstore, publishing some of the most notable poetry collections in literary history, including Ishikawa Takuboku's "A Handful of Sand" and "Sad Toys," Saito Mokichi's "Red Light," Kitahara Hakushu's "Paulownia Flowers," and Wakayama Bokusui's "Separation." Nishimura was also active as a poet under the name Nishimura Yokichi, and is known as one of the pioneers of colloquial tanka poetry. Akiko's father, Nishimura Mitsuo, served as president of Naigai Publishing.

While attending Denenchofu Futaba Junior and Senior High Schools, Akiko Nishimura studied in the United States, graduating from a local high school and College of Saint Teresa in Winona, Minnesota. She was fluent in English, French, and Spanish.

== Career and marriage ==
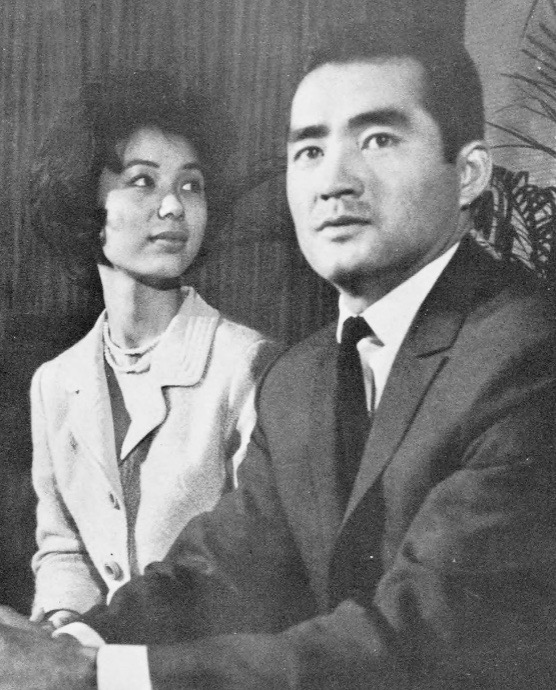
Nishimura and Shigeo Nagashima at their engagement press conference (Nov. 26, 1964)

Nishimura served as a hostess at the 1964 Tokyo Olympics, utilizing her fluency in foreign languages. During a talk hosted by the Hochi Shimbun newspaper, Shigeo, then a third baseman for the Yomiuri Giants, fell in love with her at first sight. They were quickly engaged on November 26, 1964, just 40 days after they met. Their wedding ceremony took place on January 26, 1965, at the Catholic Shibuya Church in Nanpeidai, Shibuya Ward, with Tōru Shōriki, president of the Yomiuri Giants, and his wife as witnesses. The wedding reception was held at the Hotel New Otani, and congratulatory speeches were given by Takahashi, vice president of the Yomiuri Shimbun; Shimizu Yoshichiro, president of Nippon Television; Kawashima Shojiro, vice president of the Liberal Democratic Party; Nagano Shigeo, president of Fuji Steel; Matsushita Masatoshi, president of Rikkyo University; Tetsuharu Kawakami, manager of the Yomiuri Giants; and Fujita Genji, Coach. The wedding was the most watched television event in 1965 Japan; Akiko was 22 years old and Shigeo was 29. They faithfully followed Shigeo's motto, "Don't show your face at a man's workplace," and had two sons, Kazushige and Masaoki, and two daughters, Yuki and Mina.

In 2002, Akiko Nagashima became a member of the Ministry of the Environment's "Wa-no-Kuni Living Conference," where she spoke on environmental issues from her own experience and her perspective as a housewife. On March 4, 2004, when her husband suffered a cerebral infarction, Nagashima accompanied him through his rehabilitation. In June of the same year, her eldest son, Kazushige, gave birth to twin daughters, making her a grandmother. Although she generally avoided media appearances, Nagashima made a brief appearance on Fuji TV's Kinashi Guide: Weekend Expert when Kazushige appeared as a guest, where she treated Noritake Kinashi of the comedy duo Tunnels to several types of homemade pies.

== Death ==
On September 17, 2007, after a dinner with Kazushige and his wife, Nishimura complained of feeling unwell and was hospitalized. Her husband, Shigeo, and her second daughter, Mina, rushed to her side, but she remained unconscious and died of heart failure at 4:33 AM on September 18 at the age of 64. After her death, Mina took over as CEO of Office N. According to Kazushige, her grave is in Hawaii.

== Books ==
- My American Home Cooking (Bunka Publishing Bureau, April 1991) ISBN 4579203836
