= Kōriyama-shuku Honjin =

- 郡山宿本陣
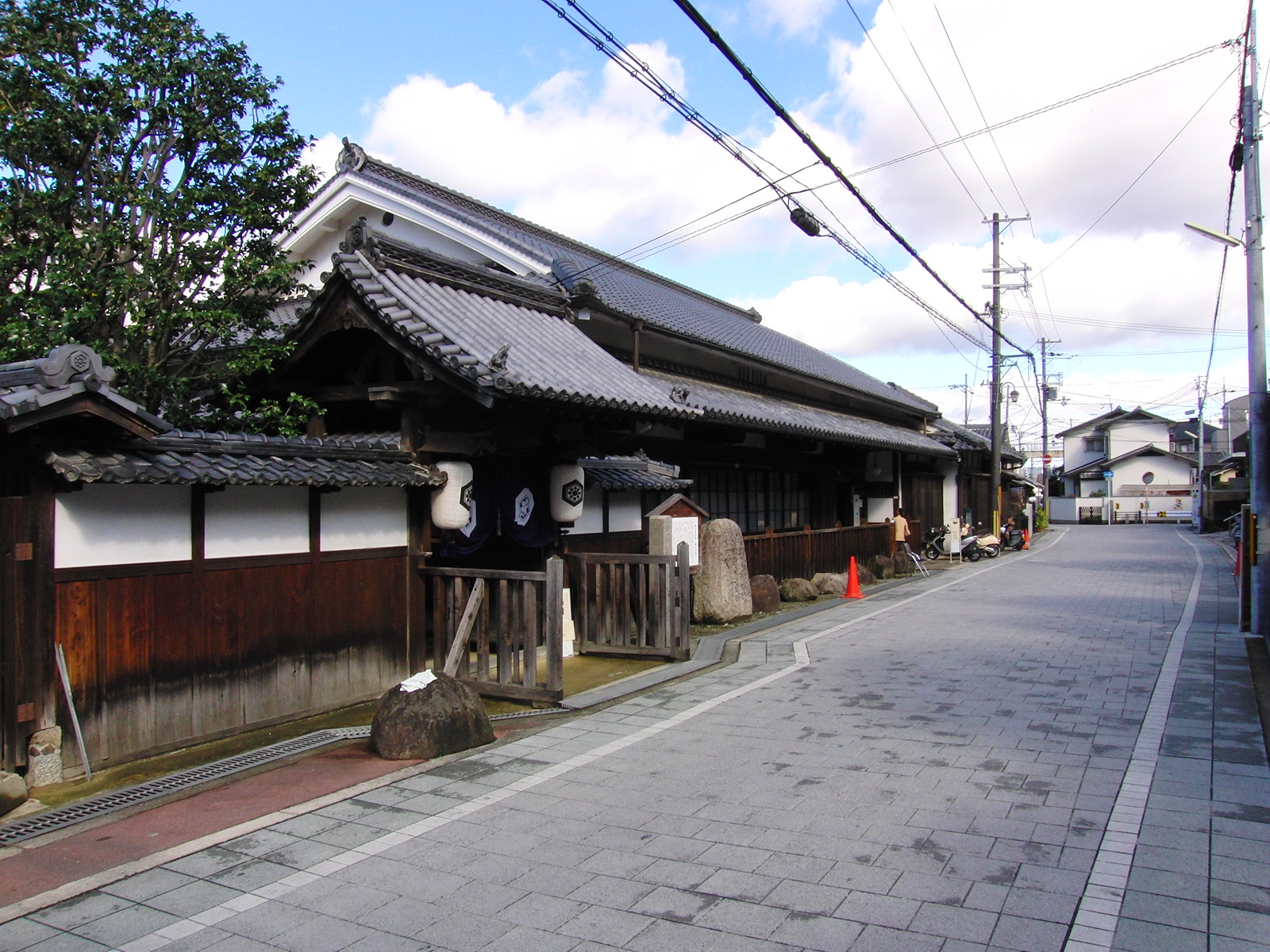
- Kōriyama-shuku Honjin

- Location within Osaka Prefecture Location within Japan

General information
- Location: Ibaraki, Osaka Prefecture, Japan
- Coordinates: 34°16′32.8″N 135°26′9.0″E
- Opened: 1718
- National Historic Site of Japan

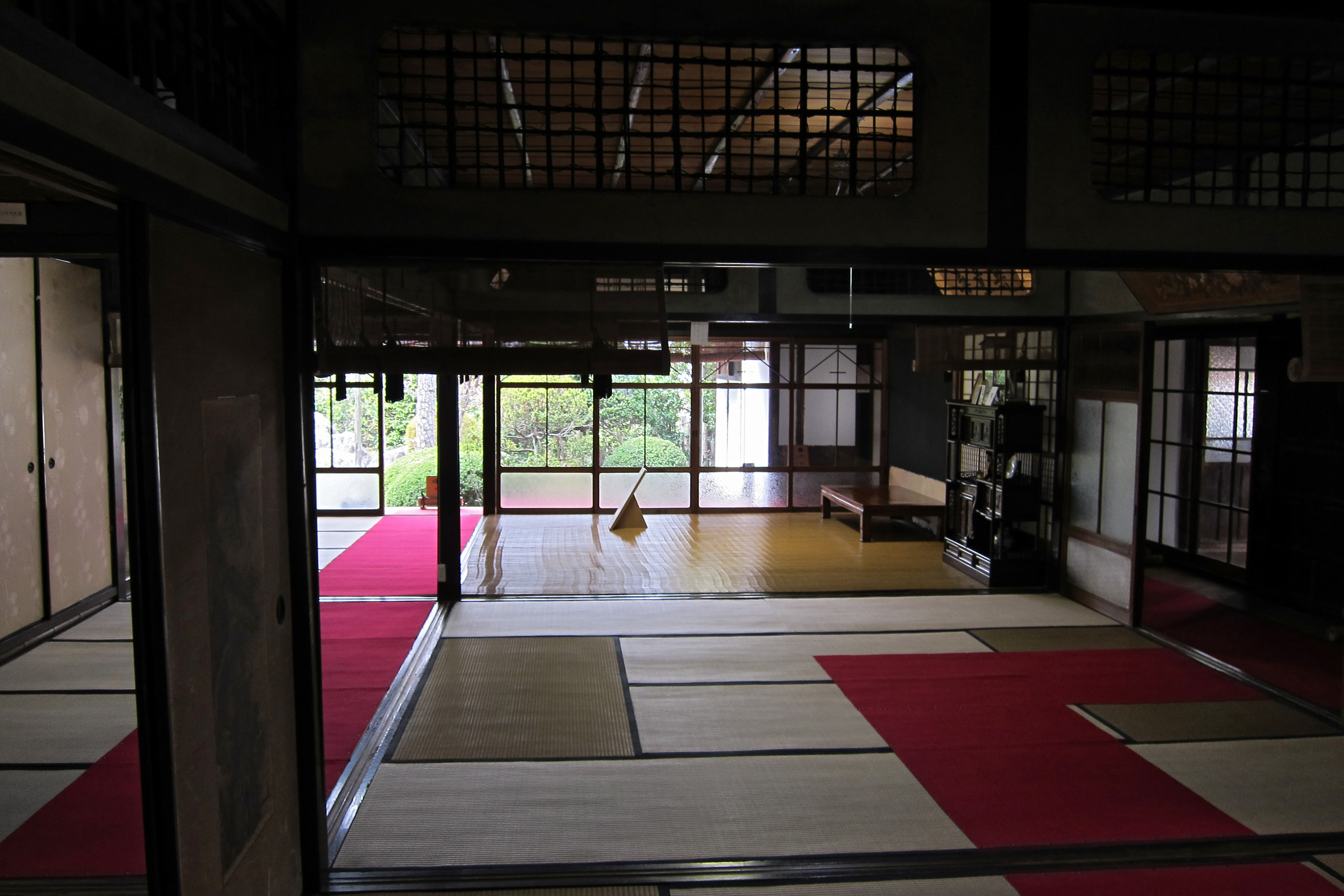
Interior

The Kōriyama-shuku Honjin (郡山宿本陣, Kōriyama-shuku Honjin) is a surviving Edo Period honjin complex located in the city of Ibaraki, Osaka Prefecture in the Kansai region of Japan. The complex was designated a National Historic Site in 1948. It was also referred to as the Tsubaki Honjin (椿の本陣) after a large Camellia japonica tree by its main gate.

== History ==
A honjin (本陣) was an inn for government officials, especially for daimyō and other representatives of the Tokugawa shogunate, which were generally located in post stations (shukuba) on major highways during the later part of the Edo period. Many of the honjin began as personal residences of village and town leaders, and expanded to include walls, gates and other features after their official designation, and in return the owners gained various special rights, including the right to a surname and to being allowed to wear a sword. The honjin were most typically used by daimyō and part of their entourages when traveling to-and-from Edo on sankin kōtai. General travelers, regardless of status or money, were not able to stay at honjin.

In the case of the Kōriyama honjin, it was located on the Saigoku Kaidō (西国街道), the main highway connecting Kyoto with Shimonoseki. This was the route used by most of the daimyō of western Japan, and contained 50 post stations, of which Kōriyama-shuku was the third stop from Kyoto. It is located almost in the middle of the route between Fushimi in Kyoto and Nishinomiya. The current structures date from 1718, when the honjin was rebuilt after a fire. The lodging book from 1696 (Genroku 9) to 1872 (Meiji 3) is preserved. According to these records daimyō on sankin kōtai stayed at the inn on average of between eight and 15 times per year, although between 1740 and 1750, the average was 30 times and in 1711 and 1863, the number was 45 times. These visits included that of Asano Naganori in 1700, one year before the famous Forty-seven rōnin incident. In addition, Emperor Meiji stayed at the honjin in 1867 when still crown prince, when he visited Chōshū Province.

Facing south on the Saigoku Highway, the honjin consists of two main buildings with tiled roofs, three kura storehouses, one barn, and one tea ceremony room. The site is still under private ownership by the original family, and in principle reservations are required for tours, although special public exhibitions are held twice a year, during which no reservations are required.

== See also ==
- List of Historic Sites of Japan (Osaka)
