= Tatsumi Hijikata =

Japanese choreographer (1928–1986)

- 土方 巽
- Tatsumi Hijikata (left) and Sada Abe (right) in 1969.
- Born: March 9, 1928; Akita, Empire of Japan
- Died: January 21, 1986 (aged 57); Shinjuku, Tokyo, Japan
- Known for: Inventor of Butoh

Tatsumi Hijikata (土方 巽, Hijikata Tatsumi; March 9, 1928 – January 21, 1986) was a Japanese choreographer, and the founder of a genre of dance performance art called Butoh. By the late 1960s, he had begun to develop this dance form, which is highly choreographed with stylized gestures drawn from his childhood memories of his northern Japan home. It is this style which is most often associated with Butoh by Westerners.

== Life ==
Tatsumi Hijikata was born Kunio Yoneyama on March 9, 1928 in Akita prefecture in northern Japan, the tenth in a family of eleven children. After having shuttled back and forth between Tokyo and his hometown from 1947, he moved to Tokyo permanently in 1952. He claims to have initially survived as a petty criminal through acts of burglary and robbery, but since he was known to embellish details of his life, it is not clear how much his account can be trusted. At the time, he studied tap, jazz, flamenco, ballet, and German expressionist dance. He undertook his first Ankoku Butoh performance, Kinjiki, in 1959, using a novel by Yukio Mishima as the raw input material for an abrupt, sexually inflected act of choreographic violence which stunned its audience. At around that time, Hijikata met three figures who would be crucial collaborators for his future work: Mishima, the photographer Eikoh Hosoe, and Donald Richie. In 1962, he and his partner Motofuji Akiko established a dance studio, Asbestos Hall, in the Meguro district of Tokyo, which would be the base for his choreographic work for the rest of his life; a shifting company of young dancers gathered around him there.

Hijikata conceived of Ankoku Butoh from its origins as an outlaw form of dance-art, and as constituting the negation of all existing forms of Japanese dance. Inspired by the criminality of the French novelist Jean Genet, Hijikata wrote manifestoes of his emergent dance form with such as titles as 'To Prison'. His dance would be one of corporeal extremity and transmutation, driven by an obsession with death, and imbued with an implicit repudiation of contemporary society and media power. Many of his early works were inspired by figures of European literature such as the Marquis de Sade and the Comte de Lautréamont, as well as by the French Surrealist movement, which had exerted an immense influence on Japanese art and literature, and had led to the creation of an autonomous and influential Japanese variant of Surrealism, whose most prominent figure was the poet Shuzo Takiguchi, who perceived Ankoku Butoh as a distinctively 'Surrealist' dance-art form.

Especially at the end of the 1950s and throughout the 1960s, Hijikata undertook collaborations with filmmakers, photographers, urban architects and visual artists as an essential element of his approach to choreography's intersections with other art forms. Among the most exceptional of these collaborations was his work with the Japanese photographer Eikoh Hosoe on the book Kamaitachi, which involved a series of journeys back to northern Japan in order to embody the presence of mythical, dangerous figures at the peripheries of Japanese life. The book references stories of a supernatural being — 'sickle-weasel' — said to have haunted the Japanese countryside of Hosoe's childhood. In the photographs, Hijikata is seen as wandering the stark landscape and confronting farmers and children.

From 1960 onward, Hijikata funded his Ankoku Butoh projects by undertaking sex-cabaret work with his company of dancers, and also acted in prominent films of the Japanese 'erotic-grotesque' horror-film genre, in such works as the director Teruo Ishii's Horrors of Malformed Men and Blind Woman's Curse, in both of which Hijikata performed Ankoku Butoh sequences.

Hijikata's period as a public performer and choreographer extended from his performance of Kinjiki in 1959 to his famous solo work, Hijikata Tatsumi and Japanese People: Revolt of the Body (inspired by preoccupations with the Roman Emperor Heliogabalus and the work of Hans Bellmer) in 1968, and then to his solo dances within group choreography such as Twenty-seven Nights for Four Seasons in 1972. He last appeared on stage as a guest performer in Dairakudakan's 1973 Myth of the Phallus. During the years from the late '60s through 1976, Hijikata experimented with using extensive surrealist imagery to alter movements. Then, Hijikata then gradually withdrew into the Asbestos Hall and devoted his time to writing and to training his dance-company. Throughout the period in which he had performed in public, Hijikata's work had been perceived as scandalous and the object of revulsion, part of a 'dirty avant-garde' which refused to assimilate itself to Japanese traditional art, power or society. However, Hijikata himself perceived his work as existing beyond the parameters of the era's avant-garde movements, and commented: 'I've never thought of myself as avant-garde. If you run around a race-track and are a full circuit behind everyone else, then you are alone and appear to be first. Maybe that is what happened to me...'.

Hijikata's period of seclusion and silence in the Asbestos Hall allowed him to mesh his Ankoku Butoh preoccupations with his memories of childhood in northern Japan, one result of which was the publication of a hybrid book-length text on memory and corporeal transformation, entitled Ailing Dancer (1983); he also compiled scrapbooks in which he annotated art-images cut from magazines with fragmentary reflections on corporeality and dance. By the mid-1980s, Hijikata was emerging from his long period of withdrawal, in particular by choreographing work for the dancer Kazuo Ohno, with whom he had begun working in the early 1960s, and whose work had become a prominent public manifestation of Butoh, despite deep divisions in their respective preoccupations. During Hijikata's seclusion, Butoh had begun to attract worldwide attention. Hijikata envisaged performing in public again, and developed new projects, but died abruptly from liver failure in January 1986, at the age of 57. Asbestos Hall, which had operated as a drinking club and film venue as well as a dance studio, was eventually sold-off and converted into a private house in the 2000s, but Hijikata's film works, scrapbooks and other artefacts were eventually collected in the form of an archive, at Keio University in Tokyo. Hijikata remains a vital figure of inspiration, in Japan and worldwide, not only for choreographers and performers, but also for visual artists, filmmakers, writers, musicians, architects, and digital artists.

== Origins of Butoh ==
Kinjiki (Forbidden Colors) by Tatsumi Hijikata, premiered at a dance festival in 1959. It was based on the novel of the same name by Yukio Mishima. It explored the taboo of homosexuality and ended with a live chicken being smothered between the legs of Kazuo Ohno's son Yoshito Ohno, after which Hijikata chasing Yoshito off the stage in darkness. Mainly as a result of the audience outrage over this piece, Hijikata was banned from the festival, establishing him as an iconoclast.

The earliest butoh performances were called (in English) "Dance Experience". In the early 1960s, Hijikata used the term "Ankoku-Buyou" (暗黒舞踊 – dance of darkness) to describe his dance. He later changed the word "buyo," filled with associations of Japanese classical dance, to "butoh," a long-discarded word for dance that originally meant European ballroom dancing.

In later work, Hijikata continued to subvert conventional notions of dance. Inspired by writers such as Yukio Mishima (as noted above), Lautréamont, Artaud, Genet and de Sade, he delved into grotesquerie, darkness, and decay. At the same time, Hijikata explored the transmutation of the human body into other forms, such as those of animals. He also developed a poetic and surreal choreographic language, butoh-fu (fu means "word" in Japanese), to help the dancer transform into other states of being.

== See also ==
- List of dancers

== Sources ==
- Fraleigh, Sondra (1999). Dancing Into Darkness - Butoh, Zen, and Japan. University of Pittsburgh Press. ISBN 1-85273-0684.
- Ohno, Kazuo, Yoshito (2004). Kazuo Ohno's World from Without and Within. Wesleyan University Press. ISBN 9780819566942.
- Barber, Stephen (2010). Hijikata – Revolt of the Body. Solar Books. ISBN 9780982046432.
- Fraleigh, Sondra (2010). Butoh - Metamorphic Dance and Global Alchemy. University of Illinois Press. ISBN 978-0-252-03553-1.
- Baird, Bruce (2012). Hijikata Tatsumi and Butoh - Dancing in a Pool of Gray Grits. Palgrave Macmillan US. ISBN 978-0-230-12040-2.
- Mikami, Kayo (2016). The Body as a Vessel. Ozaru Books. ISBN 978-0-9931587-4-2.
- Fraleigh, Sondra, Tamah, Nakamura (2017). Hijikata Tatsumi and Ohno Kazuo. Routledge. ISBN 9781138572799.
- "Tatsumi Hijikata Archive" - Research Center for the Arts and Arts Administration, Keio University. (Japanese)
