= Mutsuo =

- Gender: Male

Origin
- Origin: Japanese
- Meaning: Different meanings depending on the kanji used

Mutsuo (written: 六夫, 睦郎 or 睦夫) is a masculine Japanese given name. Notable people with the name include:

- Mutsuo Minagawa (皆川 睦夫) (1935–2005), Japanese baseball pitcher
- Mutsuo Sugiura (杉浦 睦夫) (1918–1986), Japanese engineer
- Mutsuo Tahara (田原 睦夫) (1943–2016), Japanese judge
- Mutsuo Taniguchi (谷口 睦生) (1913–1943), Japanese sprinter
- Mutsuo Takahashi (高橋 睦郎) (born 1937), Japanese poet and writer
- Mutsuo Toi (都井 睦雄) (1917-1938), perpetrator of the Tsuyama massacre
- Wakashimazu Mutsuo (若嶋津 六夫) (1957–2026), Japanese sumo wrestler

== See also ==
- Matsuo (name)
