= Aino University =

Private university in Ibaraki, Osaka, Japan

Coordinates: 34°50′34″N 135°34′56″E

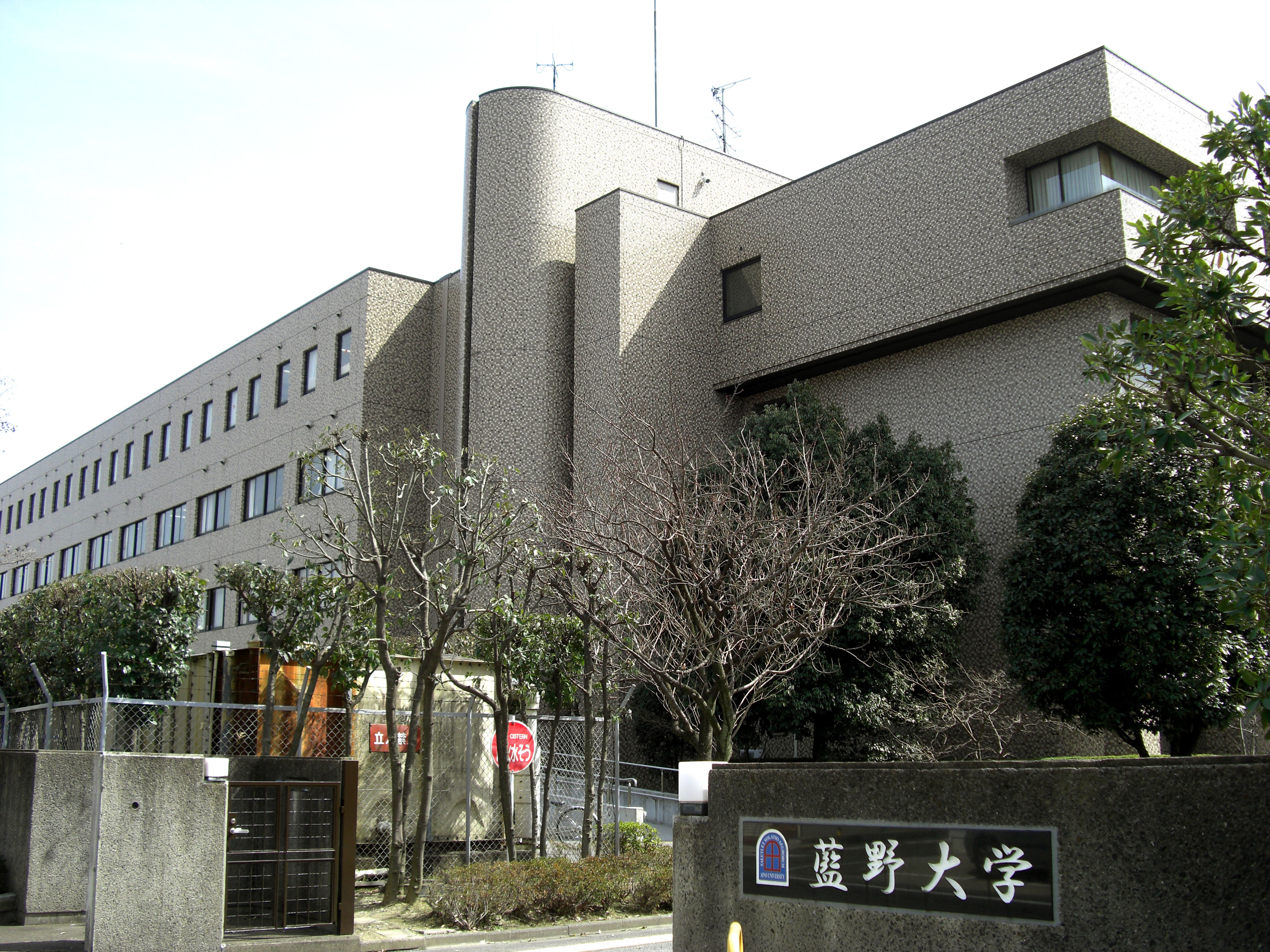
Aino University

Aino University (藍野大学, Aino daigaku) is a private university in Ibaraki, Osaka, Japan, established in 2004.

Aino College (藍野学院短期大学, Aino Gakuin Tanki Daigaku) is a private junior college affiliated with Aino University. It was established in 1985 and is also located in the city of Ibaraki, Osaka.

== University Organization ==
Faculties and Departments

- Faculty of Healthcare Sciences
  - Department of Physiotherapy
  - Department of Occupational Therapy
  - Department of Clinical Engineering
  - Department of Health Sciences
- Faculty of Nursing
  - Department of Nursing
- Graduate Schools
  - Graduate School of Nursing (Master's Programme)
    - Division of Nursing (Capacity: 6)
      - Practical Nursing Field
        - Child and Maternal Health Nursing Domain
        - Gerontological Nursing Domain
        - Psychiatric and Mental Health Nursing Domain
        - Disaster Nursing Domain
      - Nursing Management Field [1][2]
        - Community Health Nursing Domain
        - Nursing Administration Domain
        - Infection Control Nursing Domain
  - Graduate School of Health Sciences (Master's Programme)
    - Division of Health Sciences (Capacity: 6)
      - Cognitive Health Sciences Domain I
      - Cognitive Health Sciences Domain II
      - Physical Health Sciences Domain I
      - Physical Health Sciences Domain II

Affiliated Institutions

- Aino University Central Library
- Aino University Central Research Centre
