= Ibaraki, Osaka =

Ibaraki 茨木市
- Special city
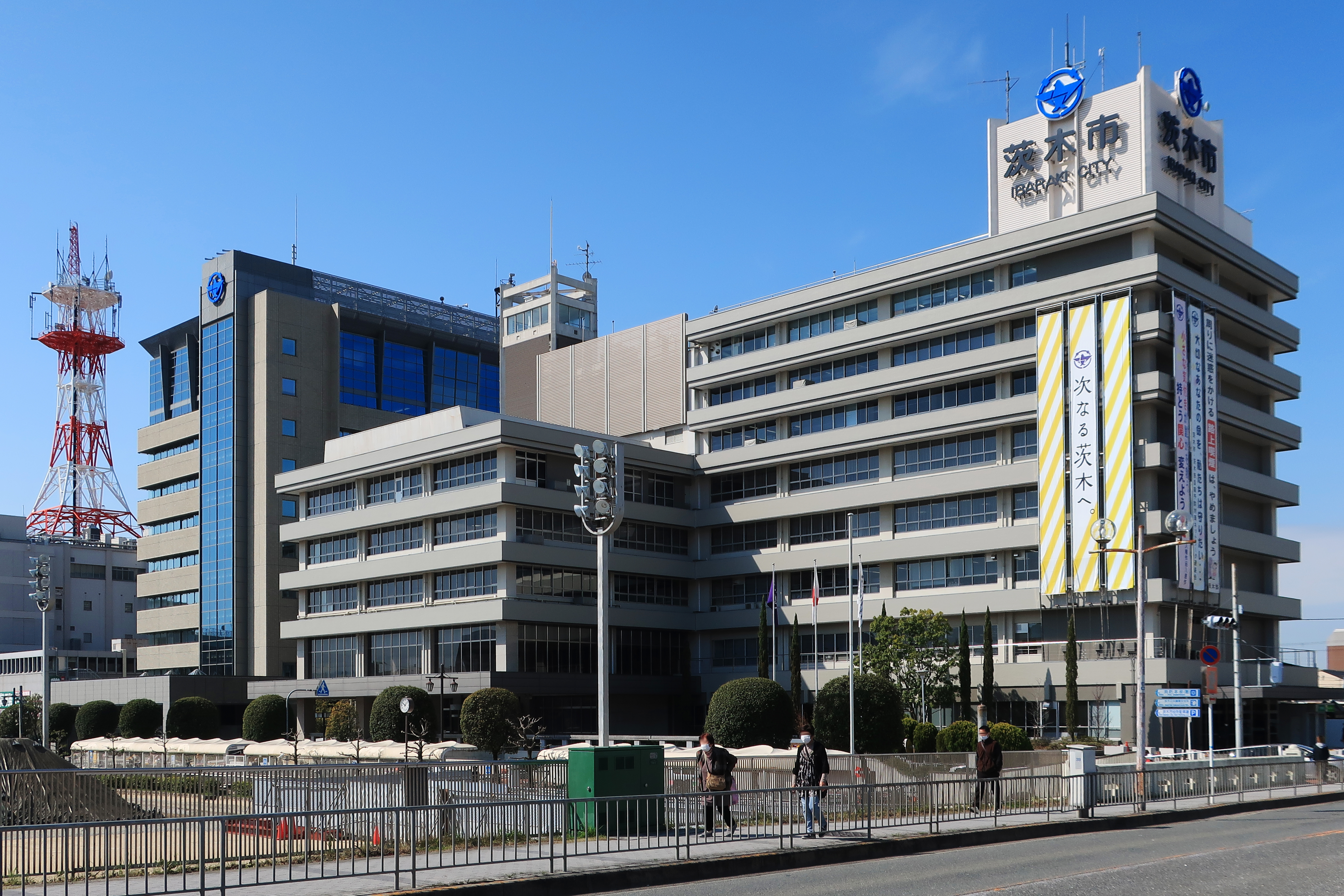
- Ibaraki City Hall

- Flag Emblem
- Interactive map of Ibaraki
- Location in Japan
- Coordinates: 34°48′59″N 135°34′7″E
- Country: Japan
- Region: Kansai
- Prefecture: Osaka

Government
  - Mayor: Yoichi Fukuoka

Area
  - Total: 76.49 km^{2} (29.53 sq mi)

Population (30 June 2026)
  - Total: 285,907
  - Density: 3,738/km^{2} (9,681/sq mi)
- Time zone: UTC+09:00 (JST)
- City hall address: 3-8-13 Ekimae, Ibaraki-shi, Ōsaka-fu 567-8505
- Website: www.city.ibaraki.osaka.jp
- Symbols
- Flower: Rose
- Tree: Oak

Ibaraki (茨木市, Ibaraki-shi; Japanese pronunciation: [ì.bä́.ɾä̀.k̟ʲì, -ɾä́.k̟ʲi̥.ɕì]) is a city in Osaka Prefecture, Japan. As of 31 March 2023, the city had an estimated population of 285,224 in 132,300 households and a population density of 3,700 persons per km^{2}. The total area of the city is 76.49 square kilometres (29.53 sq mi). It is a suburban city of Osaka City and a part of the Kyoto-Osaka-Kobe metropolitan area.

== Geography ==
Ibaraki is located in the Hokusetsu region of northern Osaka Prefecture on the northern bank of the Yodo River, bordering Kameoka City in Kyoto Prefecture to the north. It is long and narrow in the north–south direction, and the northern part is mountainous. In the south, the Mishima Plain, which forms part of the Osaka Plain, contains the main urban area. In addition, the eastern edge of the Senri Hills spans the city limits.

=== Neighboring municipalities ===
Kyoto Prefecture

- Kameoka

Osaka Prefecture

- Minoh
- Settsu
- Suita
- Takatsuki
- Toyono

== Climate ==
Ibaraki has a humid subtropical climate (Köppen Cfa) characterized by warm summers and cool winters with light to no snowfall. The average annual temperature in Ibaraki is 14.2 °C. The average annual rainfall is 1475 mm with September as the wettest month. The temperatures are highest on average in August, at around 26.2 °C, and lowest in January, at around 2.8 °C.

== Demographics ==
Per Japanese census data, the population of Ibaraki has risen steadily over the past century.

Historical population
Year	Pop.	±%
1960	71,859	—
1970	163,545	+127.6%
1980	234,062	+43.1%
1990	254,078	+8.6%
2000	260,648	+2.6%
2010	274,832	+5.4%

== History ==
The area of the modern city of Ibaraki was within ancient Settsu Province, and was the site of large settlements in the Yayoi period and was the location of large burial mounds in the Kofun period, including the Ota Chausuyama Kofun, which is designated by the Imperial Household Agency as the mausoleum of Emperor Keitai. In the first half of the Muromachi period, Kusunoki Masashige built Ibaraki Castle, and the jōkamachi which was established around this castle became the core of the modern city. In the Sengoku period, the area was ruled by the Christian daimyō, Takayama Ukon. In the Edo Period, it was directly controlled by Tokugawa shogunate due to its strategic importance on the Sanyōdō highway. The village of Ibaraki was established with the creation of the modern municipalities system on 1 April 1889. On 1 April 1896 the area became part of Mishima District, Osaka. Ibaraki was raised to town status on 14 October 1898 and to city status on 1 January 1948. On 1 April 2001 Ibaraki was designated a Special city with increased local autonomy.

== Government ==
Ibaraki has a mayor-council form of government with a directly elected mayor and a unicameral city council of 28 members. Ibaraki contributes three members to the Osaka Prefectural Assembly. In terms of national politics, the city is part of Osaka 9th district of the lower house of the Diet of Japan.

== Economy ==
Ibaraki is a regional commercial center and distribution hub for northern Osaka. Due to its proximity to the Osaka metropolitan area, it is also a commuter town. The city also has a growing and very diverse industrial base.

== Education ==
=== Colleges and universities ===
- Aino University
- Baika Women's University
- Osaka Yukioka College of Health Science
- Osaka Health Science University Ibaraki campus
- Otemon Gakuin University
- Ritsumeikan University - Osaka-Ibaraki campus

=== Primary and secondary education ===
Ibaraki has 32 public elementary schools and 14 public middle schools operated by the city government and six public high school operated by the Osaka Prefectural Department of Education. There are also three private combined middle/high schools and two private high schools. The prefecture also operates one special education school for the handicapped.

- Hokusetsu Tsubasa High School (北摂つばさ高等学校)
- Ibaraki Engineering High School (茨木工科高等学校)
- Kasugaoka High School (春日丘高等学校)
- Osaka Ibaraki High School (茨木高等学校)
- Osaka Ibaraki Nishi High School (茨木西高等学校)
- Osaka Prefectural Fukui Senior High School (福井高等学校)

Private junior and senior high schools:

- Kansai Ohkura Junior and Senior High School (関西大倉中学校・高等学校)
- Korea International School, a Korean international junior and senior high school, is in Ibaraki.
- Otemon Junior & Senior High School (追手門学院中学校・高等学校)
- Waseda Setsuryo Junior High School-High School (早稲田摂陵中学校・高等学校)

Private senior high schools:

- Aino High School (藍野高等学校)
- Koyodai High School (向陽台高等学校)

== Transportation ==
=== Railway ===
JR West – JR Kyōto Line

- Ibaraki - JR-Sōjiji

Hankyu Railway Hankyu Kyoto Line

- Minami-Ibaraki - Ibaraki-shi - Sōjiji

Osaka Monorail - Main Line

- Unobe - Minami-Ibaraki - Sawaragi

Osaka Monorail - Saito Line

- Handai-byōin-mae - Toyokawa - Saito-nishi

=== Highway ===
- Meishin Expressway
- National Route 171

== Sister cities ==
- Minneapolis, Minnesota, United States, sister city agreement since 1980
- Anqing, Anhui, China, friendship city agreement since 1985
- Shōdoshima, Kagawa, Japan, sister city agreement since 1988 (with former Uchinomi town)
- Taketa, Ōita, Japan, history cultural sister city agreement since 2013

== Local attractions ==
- Church of the Light
- Abuyama Kofun, National Historic Site
- Kōriyama-shuku Honjin

== Notable people from Ibaraki, Osaka ==
- Ryota Hama, Japanese professional wrestler and retired sumo wrestler
- Satoshi Ishii, Japanese-Croatian judoka and mixed martial artist.
- Kusunoki Masashige, Japanese samurai of the Kamakura period
- Taiga Matsuo, professional Japanese baseball player
- Yasumichi Morita, interior designer
- Katagiri Katsumoto, Japanese warlord daimyō of the Azuchi–Momoyama period through early Edo period.
- Hiroyuki Onoue, Japanese actor
- Subaru Shibutani, Japanese singer, actor and lyricist (Kanjani Eight)
- Chisato Moritaka, Japanese pop singer, songwriter and multi-instrumentalist
- Tatsuo Kamon, Japanese singer-songwriter
- Takaharu Nishino, Japanese football player
- Mizuki Ichimaru, Japanese football player
- Manabu Ikeda, former Japanese football player
- Sayaka Yamamoto, Japanese singer and songwriter (NMB48 and AKB48)
- Atsushi Kimura, former Japanese football player
- Shinichi Terada, Japanese football player
- Takuto Hayashi, Japanese football player
- Kenji Matsuda, Japanese actor
- Teruo Sugihara, Japanese professional golfer
- Yuta Nakatsuka, Japanese Dancer and actor (Generations from Exile Tribe)
- Takuya Kurosawa, Japanese racing driver
- Kazuhiro Tanaka, Japanese drifting driver
