= Nisei =

Children of Japanese immigrants

Nisei (二世, "second generation") is a Japanese-language term used in countries in North America and South America to specify the ethnically Japanese children born in the new country to Japanese-born immigrants, or Issei. The Nisei, or second generation, in turn are the parents of the Sansei, or third generation. These Japanese-language terms derive from ichi, ni, san, "one, two, three", the ordinal numbers used with sei (see Japanese numerals). Though nisei means "second-generation immigrant", it more specifically often refers to the children of the initial diaspora, occurring during the period of the Empire of Japan in the late 19th and early 20th centuries and overlapping in the U.S. with the Greatest Generation and Silent Generation.

== History ==
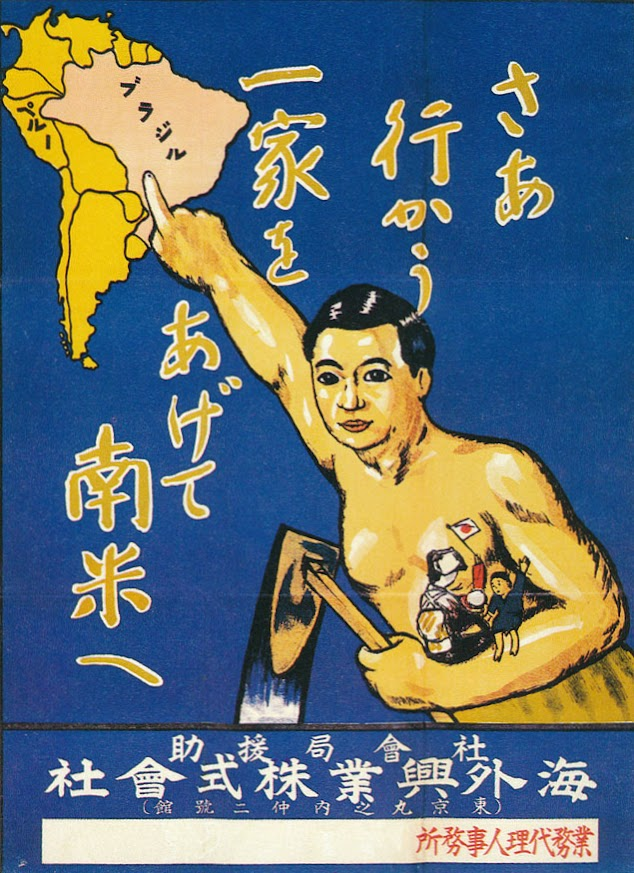
A poster used in Japan to attract immigrants to Brazil. It reads: "Let's go to South America [Brazil highlighted] with your entire family."

Although the earliest organized group of Japanese emigrants left Japan centuries ago, and a later group settled in Mexico in 1897, today's largest populations of Japanese immigrants and their descendants are concentrated in four countries: Brazil (2 million), the United States (1.5 million), Canada (130,000), and Peru (100,000).

=== American Nisei ===
Some US Nisei were born after the end of World War II during the baby boom. Most Nisei, however, who were living in the western United States during World War II, were forcibly interned with their parents (Issei) after Executive Order 9066 was promulgated to remove everyone of Japanese descent from the West Coast areas of California, Oregon, Washington, and Alaska. It has been argued that some Nisei feel caught in a dilemma between their Issei parents and other Americans. The Nisei of Hawaii had a somewhat different experience.

In the United States, two representative Nisei were Daniel Inouye and Fred Korematsu. Hawaiian-born Daniel Ken Inouye (井上 建, Inoue Ken; 1924–2012) was one of many young Nisei men who volunteered to fight in the nation's military when restrictions against Japanese-American enlistment were removed in 1943. Inouye later went on to become a U.S. Senator from Hawaii after it achieved statehood.

Fred Toyosaburo Korematsu (是松 豊三郎, Korematsu Toyosaburō; 1919–2005) was one of many Japanese-American citizens living on the West Coast who resisted internment during World War II. In 1944, Korematsu lost a U.S. Supreme Court challenge to the wartime internment of Japanese Americans but gained vindication decades later. The Presidential Medal of Freedom, the highest civilian honor in the United States, was awarded to Korematsu in 1998. At the White House award ceremonies, President Bill Clinton explained, "In the long history of our country's constant search for justice, some names of ordinary citizens stand for millions of souls. Plessy, Brown, Parks ... to that distinguished list, today we add the name of Fred Korematsu."

The overwhelming majority of Japanese Americans had reacted to the internment by acquiescing to the government's order, hoping to prove their loyalty as Americans. To them, Korematsu's opposition was treacherous to both his country and his community. Across the span of decades, he was seen as a traitor, a test case, an embarrassment and, finally, a hero.

=== Brazilian Nisei ===
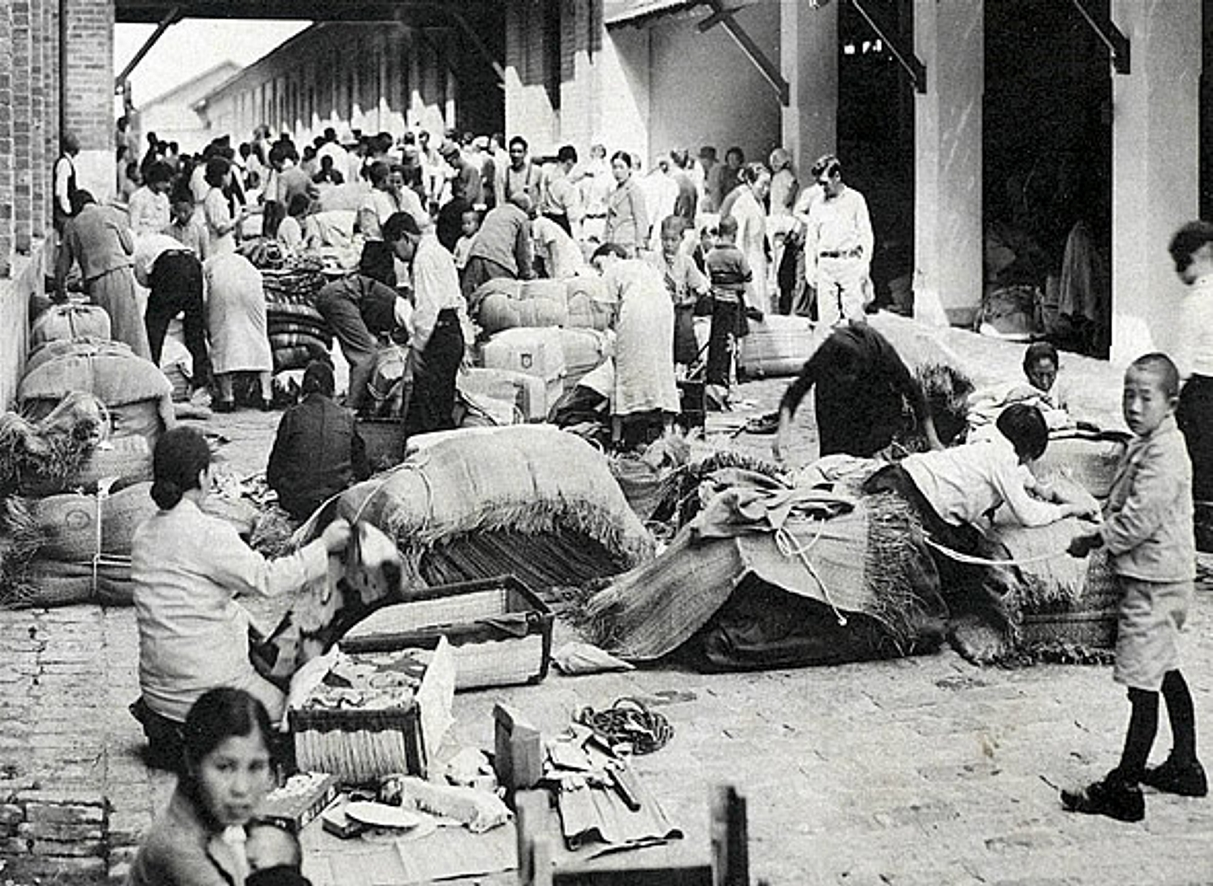
The children of these Japanese Brazilian (Nipo-brasileiros) immigrants would be called Nisei.

Brazil is home to the largest Japanese population outside of Japan, estimated to number more than 1.5 million (including those of mixed-race or mixed-ethnicity), more than that of the 1.2 million in the United States. The Nisei Japanese Brazilians are an important part of the ethnic minority in that South American nation.

=== Canadian Nisei ===
Within Japanese-Canadian communities across Canada, three distinct subgroups developed, each with different sociocultural referents, generational identity, and wartime experiences.

=== Peruvian Nisei ===
Among the approximately 80,000 Peruvians of Japanese descent, the Nisei Japanese Peruvians comprise the largest element.

== Cultural profile ==
=== Generations ===
Japanese Americans and Japanese Canadians have special names for each of their generations in North America. These are formed by combining one of the Japanese numbers corresponding to the generation with the Japanese word for generation (世 sei). The Japanese-American and Japanese-Canadian communities have themselves distinguished their members with terms like Issei, Nisei, and Sansei which describe the first, second and third generation of immigrants. The fourth generation is called Yonsei (四世) and the fifth is called Gosei (五世). The Issei, Nisei and Sansei generations reflect distinctly different attitudes to authority, gender, non-Japanese involvement, and religious belief and practice, and other matters. The age when individuals faced the wartime evacuation and internment is the single, most significant factor which explains these variations in their experiences, attitudes and behaviour patterns.

The Gosei and later generations typically identify more with the adopted country and are acculturated with only vestigial cultural affiliation without a single surviving grandparent with firsthand memory of the language and cultural traditions, as with any ethnic group, and don't identify strongly enough to use Japanese language generation names. American descendants of Wakamatsu colonist Masumizu Kuninosuke are in the seventh (Nanasei) generation through his marriage to a mixed African-Native American woman in 1877, and some only discovered the ancestry of their 1/64th ancestor through a DNA test.

The term Nikkei (日系) encompasses all of the world's Japanese immigrants across generations. The collective memory of the Issei and older Nisei was an image of Meiji Japan from 1870 through 1911, which contrasted sharply with the Japan that newer immigrants had more recently left. These differing attitudes, social values and associations with Japan were often incompatible. In this context, the significant differences in post-war experiences and opportunities did nothing to mitigate the gaps which separated generational perspectives.

| Generation | Cohort description |
|---|---|
| Issei (一世) | The generation of people born in Japan who later immigrated to another country. |
| Nisei (二世) | The generation of people born in North America, South America, Australia, Hawaii, or any country outside Japan either to at least one Issei or one non-immigrant Japanese parent. |
| Sansei (三世) | The generation of people born to at least one Nisei parent. |
| Yonsei (四世) | The generation of people born to at least one Sansei parent. |
| Gosei (五世) | The generation of people born to at least one Yonsei parent. |

The second generation of immigrants, born in Canada or the United States to parents not born in Canada or the United States, is called Nisei (二世). Some Nisei have resisted being absorbed into the majority society, largely because of their tendency to maintain Japanese interpersonal styles of relationships.

Most Nisei were educated in Canadian or American school systems where they were taught Canadian or American national values as citizens of those countries. When these were taken away in the early 1940s, the Nisei confronted great difficulty in accepting or coming to terms with internment and forced resettlement. Older Nisei tended to identify more closely with the Issei, sharing similar economic and social characteristics. Older Nisei who had been employed in small businesses, farming, fishing or in semi-skilled occupations, tended to remain in blue-collar work. In contrast, the younger Nisei attended university and college and entered various professions and white-collar employment after the war. This sharp division in post-war experiences and opportunities exacerbated the gaps between these Nisei.

In North America, since the redress victory in 1988, a significant evolutionary change has occurred. The Nisei, their parents and their children are changing the way they look at themselves as individuals of Japanese descent in their respective nations of Canada, the United States and Mexico.

There are currently just over one hundred thousand British Japanese, mostly in London; but unlike other Nikkei terms used centered from Japan to distinguish the distance from Japanese nationality elsewhere in the world, these Britons do not conventionally parse their communities in generational terms as Issei, Nisei, or Sansei.

==== Aging ====
The kanreki (還暦), a traditional, pre-modern Japanese rite of passage to old age at 60, was sometimes celebrated by the Issei, and is now being celebrated by increasing numbers of Nisei. Rituals are enactments of shared meanings, norms, and values; and this Japanese rite of passage highlights a collective response among the Nisei to the conventional dilemmas of growing older. Aging is affecting the demographics of the Nisei. According to a 2011 columnist in The Rafu Shimpo of Los Angeles, the obituaries showing the number of Japanese Americans in their 80s and 90s—Nisei, in a word—who are passing is staggering"

=== Languages ===
The Japanese-born Issei learned Japanese as their mother tongue, and their success in learning English as a second language was varied. Most Nisei speak Japanese to some extent, learned from Issei parents, Japanese school, and living in a Japanese community or in the internment camps. A majority of English-speaking Nisei have retained knowledge of the Japanese language, at least in its spoken form. Most Sansei speak English as their first language and most marry people of non-Japanese ancestry.

=== Education ===
An illustrative point-of-view, as revealed in the poetry of an Issei woman:

By Meiji parents
Emigrants to Canada
The Nisei were raised to be
Canadian citizens
Of whom they could be proud.

— Kinori Oka, Kisaragi Poem Study Group, 1975.

=== Intermarriage ===
There was relatively little intermarriage during the Nisei generation, partly because the war and the unconstitutional incarceration of these American citizens intervened exactly at a time when the group was of marrying age. Identification of them with the enemy by the American public, made them unpopular and unlikely candidates for interracial marriage. Besides this, they were thrown, en masse, into concentration camps with others of the same ethnicity, causing the majority of Nisei to marry other Nisei. Another factor is that anti-miscegenation laws criminalizing interracial marriage, cohabitation, and sex were in effect in many U.S. states until 1967.

This is why third generation Sansei are mostly still of the same racial appearance as the Issei, who first immigrated to the U.S. The Sansei generation has widely intermarried in the post WWII years, with estimates of such unions at over 60 percent. In contrast, interracial marriage is much more common in Brazil, which led to a higher degree of mixed ethnicity there despite the larger Japanese population.

== History ==
=== Internment ===
When the Canadian and American governments interned West Coast Japanese citizens, Japanese American citizens, and Japanese Canadian citizens in 1942, neither distinguished between American/Canadian-born citizens of Japanese ancestry (Nisei) and their parents, born in Japan but now living in the U.S. or Canada (Issei).

=== Redress ===
==== Japanese American redress ====
In 1978, the Japanese American Citizens League actively began demanding be taken as redress for harms endured by Japanese Americans during World War II.

In 1980, Congress established the Commission on Wartime Relocation and Internment of Civilians (CWRIC) The commission report, Personal Justice Denied, condemned the internment as "unjust and motivated by racism rather than real military necessity".

In 1988, U.S. President Ronald Reagan signed the Civil Liberties Act of 1988, which provided for a formal apology and payments of $20,000 for each survivor. The legislation stated that government actions were based on "race prejudice, war hysteria, and a failure of political leadership". The Civil Liberties Act Amendments of 1992, appropriating an additional $400 million in order to ensure that all remaining internees received their $20,000 redress payments, was signed into law by President George H. W. Bush, who also issued another formal apology from the U.S. government.

Japanese and Japanese Americans who were relocated during WWII were compensated for direct property losses in 1948. These payments were awarded to 82,210 Japanese Americans or their heirs at a cost of $1.6 billion; the program's final disbursement occurred in 1999.

==== Japanese Canadian redress ====
In 1983, the National Association of Japanese Canadians (NAJC) mounted a campaign demanding redress for injustices during the war years. NAJC hired Price Waterhouse to estimate the economic losses to Japanese Canadians resulting from property confiscations and loss of wages due to internment. On the basis of detailed records maintained by the Custodian of Alien Property, it was determined that the total loss totalled $443 million (in 1986 dollars).

In 1988, Prime Minister Brian Mulroney gave that long-awaited formal apology and the Canadian government began to make good on a compensation package—including $21,000 to all surviving internees, and the re-instatement of Canadian citizenship to those who were deported to Japan.

== Notable individuals ==
The number of Nisei who have earned some degree of public recognition has continued to increase over time; but the quiet lives of those whose names are known only to family and friends are no less important in understanding the broader narrative of the nikkei. Although the names highlighted here are over-represented by Nisei from North America, the Latin American member countries of the Pan American Nikkei Association (PANA) include Argentina, Bolivia, Brazil, Chile, Colombia, Mexico, Paraguay, Peru, and Uruguay, in addition to the English-speaking United States and Canada.

- John Fujio Aiso (1909–1987), American military leader, lawyer, and judge
- Sally Amaki, American singer and voice actress based in Tokyo
- Steve Aoki (born 1977), Japanese American electro house musician
- Alberto Fujimori (born 1938), President of Peru, 1990–2000
- Francis Fukuyama (born 1952), philosopher and political economist
- Luiz Gushiken (1950–2013), Brazilian politician and activist
- Barney F. Hajiro (1916–2011), Medal of Honor recipient in World War II
- Mikio Hasemoto (1916–1943), Medal of Honor recipient in World War II recipient in World War II
- Joe Hayashi (1920–1945), Medal of Honor recipient in World War II
- Shizuya Hayashi (1917–2008), Medal of Honor recipient in World War II
- William Hohri (1927–2010), political activist
- May Shiga Hornback (1924–1976), American nurse and nursing educator
- James Iha (born 1968), guitarist, member of alternative rock band The Smashing Pumpkins
- Daniel K. Inouye (1924–2012), Senator from Hawaii, Medal of Honor recipient in World War II
- Yeiki Kobashigawa (1920–2005), Medal of Honor recipient in World War II
- Yuri Kochiyama (1921–2014), civil rights activist
- Ford Konno (born 1933), Olympic gold medalist (1952, 1952) and silver medalist (1952, 1956) swimmer
- Tommy Kono (1930–2016 ), Olympic gold medalist (1952, 1956) and silver medalist (1960) weightlifter and only lifter to have set world records in four different weightlifting classes
- Robert T. Kuroda (1922–1944), Medal of Honor recipient in World War II
- Ben Kuroki (1917–2015), only Japanese American U.S. Army Air Forces aircrew member to fly combat missions in the Pacific theater in World War II
- Mike Masaoka (1915–1991) leader of the Japanese American Citizens League (JACL)
- Spark Matsunaga (1916–1990), US Senator from Hawaii
- Norman Mineta (1931–2022), former Congressman from California and Secretary of Transportation
- Wataru Misaka (1923–2019), became the first player of Asian descent and the first non-Caucasian to play in the NBA in 1947
- Hiroshi Miyamura (1925–2022), US Medal of Honor recipient in Korean War
- Pat Morita (1932–2005), television and movie actor nominated for the Academy Award for Best Supporting Actor in 1984
- Kaoru Moto (1917–1992), Medal of Honor
- Sadao Munemori (1922–1945), Medal of Honor recipient in World War II
- Kiyoshi K. Muranaga (1922–1944), Medal of Honor recipient in World War II
- Mirai Nagasu (1993– ), U.S. Figure Skating champion in 2008 and Olympic bronze medalist
- Masato Nakae (1917–1998), Medal of Honor recipient in World War II
- Shinyei Nakamine (1920–1944), Medal of Honor recipient in World War II
- William K. Nakamura (1922–1944), Medal of Honor recipient in World War II
- George Nakashima (1905–1990), furniture and cabinetmaker
- Joe M. Nishimoto (1920–1944), Medal of Honor recipient in World War II
- Isamu Noguchi (1904–1988), sculptor and landscape architect
- Lars Nootbaar (born 1997), Major League Baseball player
- Allan M. Ohata (1918–1977), Medal of Honor recipient in World War II
- Apolo Anton Ohno (born 1982) Olympic gold (2002, 2006), silver (2002, 2010), and bronze (2006, 2010) medalist speed skater
- John Okada (1923–1971), writer
- James K. Okubo (1920–1967), Medal of Honor recipient in World War II
- Yukio Okutsu (1921–2003), Medal of Honor recipient in World War II
- Frank H. Ono (1923–1980), Medal of Honor recipient in World War II
- Ken Ono (born 1968), mathematician
- Santa J. Ono (born 1962), immunologist, President University of Cincinnati, President University of British Columbia, President University of Michigan
- Kazuo Otani (1918–1944), Medal of Honor recipient in World War II
- Yoshinobu Oyakawa (born 1933), Olympic gold medalist (1952) in swimming
- George T. Sakato (1921–2015), Medal of Honor recipient in World War II
- James Shigeta (1929–2014), an American film and television actor
- Mike Shinoda (born 1977), musician, rapper, singer, songwriter, record producer, graphic designer, manager and film composer. Member of the American band Linkin Park and supplementary group Fort Minor
- Monica Sone (1919–2011), American author of the autobiographical Nisei Daughter
- David Suzuki (born 1936), Canadian academic, science broadcaster and environmental activist
- Shinkichi Tajiri (1923–2009), sculptor
- Atsuko Tanaka (ski jumper) (born 1992), Canadian Olympic ski jumper
- George Takei (born 1937), actor and gay rights activist best known for his role in the television series Star Trek
- Ted T. Tanouye (1919–1944), Medal of Honor recipient in World War II
- Traci Toguchi (born 1974), actress and singer
- Hisaye Yamamoto (1921–2011), author
- Minoru Yamasaki (1912–1986), architect best known for the New York World Trade Center "Twin Towers"
- Karl Yoneda (1906–1999), Communist labor activist
- George Yoshia (born 1922), California musician and teacher

== Related identity terms ==
Nisei is one of several cultural identifiers for bicultural populations in the United States. Similar terms include American-born Chinese (ABC) for Chinese Americans, American-Born Confused Desi (ABCD) for South Asian Americans, Generation Ñ for bilingual Latinos, Chicano for Mexican Americans, and Nuyorican for New York Puerto Ricans.

== See also ==
- 100th Infantry Battalion (United States)
- 442nd Infantry Regiment (United States)
- Asian American
- Asian Canadian
- Go For Broke Monument
- Hyphenated American
- Japanese American Citizens League
- Japanese American internment
- Japanese American National Library
- Japanese American National Museum
- Japanese Brazilian
- Japanese Canadian
- Japanese in the United Kingdom
- Japanese people
- List of Japanese Americans
- Model minority
- Nisei Baseball Research Project
- Pacific Movement of the Eastern World

== Bibliography ==
- Dinnerstein, Leonard & Reimers, David M. (1999). Ethnic Americans: A History of Immigration. New York: Columbia University Press. ISBN 978-0-231-11189-8
- Hosokawa, Bill. (2002). Nisei: The Quiet Americans. Boulder: University Press of Colorado ISBN 978-0-87081-668-0
- Itoh, Keiko. (2001). The Japanese Community in Pre-War Britain: From Integration to Disintegration. London: Routledge. ISBN 978-0-7007-1487-2
- McLellan, Janet. (1999). Many Petals of the Lotus: Five Asian Buddhist Communities in Toronto. Toronto: University of Toronto Press. ISBN 978-0-8020-8225-1
- Moulin, Pierre. (2007). Dachau, Holocaust, and US Samurais: Nisei Soldiers First in Dachau? Bloomington, Indiana: AuthorHouse. ISBN 978-1-4259-3801-7
- Tamura, Eileen & Daniels, Roger. (1994). Americanization, Acculturation, and Ethnic Identity: The Nisei Generation in Hawaii. Urbana: University of Illinois Press. ISBN 978-0-252-06358-9
- Yenne, Bill. (2007). Rising Sons: The Japanese American GIs Who Fought for the United States in World War II. New York: Macmillan. ISBN 978-0-312-35464-0
- Yoo, David & Daniels, Roger. (1999). Growing Up Nisei: Race, Generation, and Culture Among Japanese Americans of California, 1924–49. Urbana: University of Illinois Press. ISBN 978-0-252-06822-5
