= Shigeo Nagashima =

Japanese baseball player and manager (1936–2025)

Shigeo Nagashima 長嶋 茂雄 / 長島 茂雄
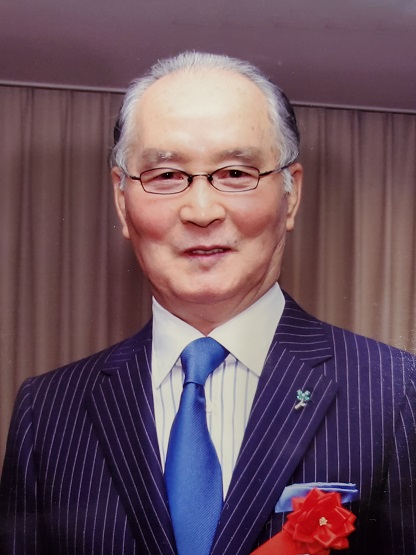
- Nagashima in November 2021
- Third baseman
- Born: February 20, 1936; Sakura, Chiba, Empire of Japan (Now Japan)
- Died: June 3, 2025 (aged 89); Tokyo, Japan
- Batted: Right Threw: Right

NPB debut
- April 5, 1958, for the Yomiuri Giants

Last appearance
- October 14, 1974, for the Yomiuri Giants

NPB statistics
- Batting average: .305
- Home runs: 444
- Hits: 2,471
- Runs batted in: 1,522
- Win–loss record: 1,034–948
- Winning %: .522
- Stats at Baseball Reference

Teams
- As player: Yomiuri Giants (1958–1974); As manager: Yomiuri Giants (1975–1980, 1993–2001)

Career highlights and awards
- As player: 11× Japan Series champion (1961, 1963, 1965, 1966, 1967, 1968, 1969, 1970, 1971, 1972, 1973); 17× Best Nine Award (1958–1974); Central League Rookie of the Year (1958); 5× Central League MVP (1961, 1963, 1966, 1968, 1971); 4× Japan Series MVP (1963, 1965, 1969, 1970); Japan Professional Sports Grand Prize (1971); Yomiuri Giants #3 retired; As manager: 2× Japan Series champion (1994, 2000); Matsutaro Shoriki Award (1994)

Member of the Japanese

Baseball Hall of Fame
- Induction: 1988

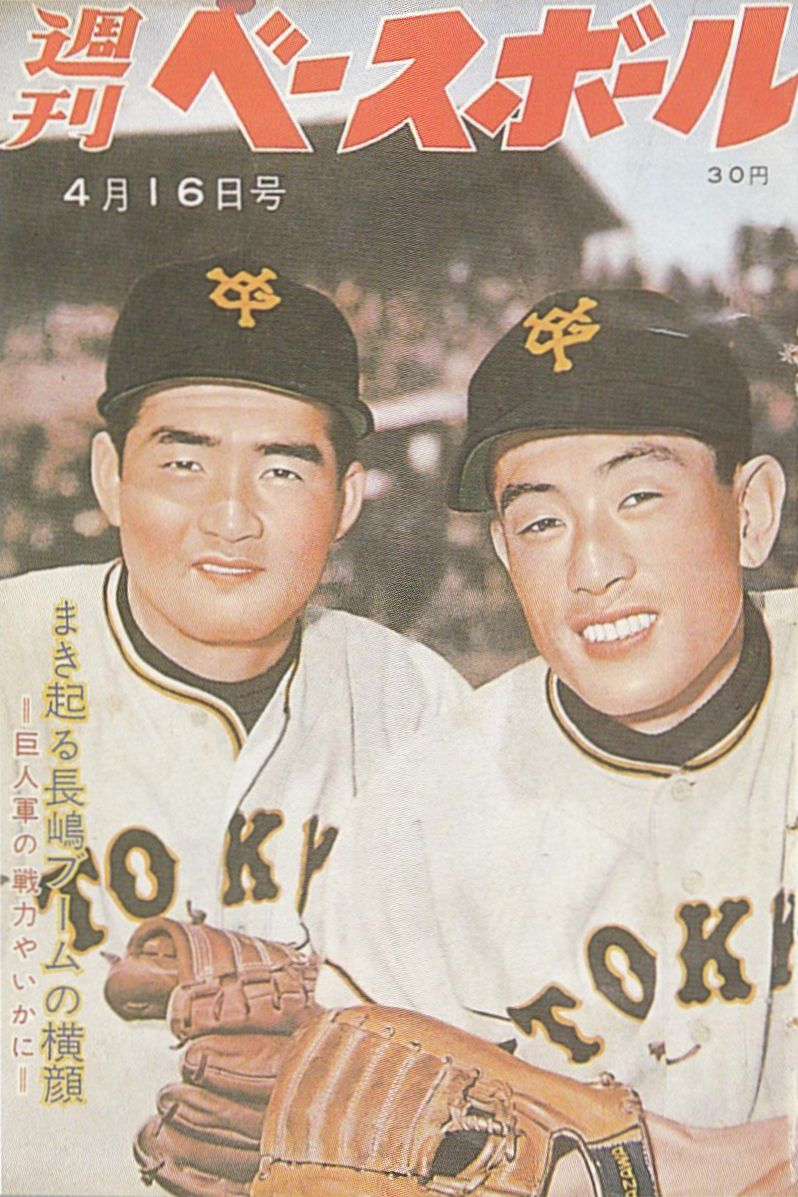
The magazine Weekly Baseball issue on April 16, 1958, featured Nagashima (left) and Tatsuro Hirooka (right) on the cover

Shigeo Nagashima (長嶋 茂雄 or 長島 茂雄, Nagashima Shigeo; February 20, 1936 – June 3, 2025) was a Japanese professional baseball player and manager. Nagashima first began playing baseball in elementary school, before playing at his high school in Chiba Prefecture, part of Kanto Region, just before he played as a third baseman for Rikkyo University. After winning the batting title for two straight years in Tokyo Big6 Baseball League, Nagashima made his professional debut in 1958 with the Yomiuri Giants. In his rookie season, he led the Central League in home runs and runs batted in, with 29 and 92 respectively and ultimately received Rookie of the Year honors. With the arrival of Sadaharu Oh in 1959, the two would both become a dual force in being the best hitters in the game that earned the nickname "O-N Cannon" for one of the most dominant dynasties in NPB history, and Nagashima won league MVP five times while being named to the Best Nine Award in every season he played; his four Japan Series MVP award wins is still the most in NPB history. After retiring in 1974, he became as a manager of the Giants from 1975 to 1980, and again from 1993 to 2001; during this time, he won the Japan Series twice.

His nicknames includes "Mr. Pro Baseball", "Mr. Giants", and "Hot Man" of Japan. Nagashima is regarded as a beloved national figure of postwar Japan, on par with Hibari Misora and Yujiro Ishihara.

== Early life and amateur career ==
Nagashima was born on February 20, 1936, in Sakura, Chiba Prefecture, Empire of Japan (Now Japan), to his parents, Chiyo and Toshi Nagashima. He was the youngest of four siblings, with one older brother and two older sisters. His whole family was a farming family, but the land was rented out. His father, Toshi, who worked as a town tax collector and deputy mayor of Usui Town, but unfortunately died of heart attack in 1954 when he was 18. While his mother, Chiyo died of natural causes on July 9, 1994.

He began playing in fourth grade of elementary school, and idolized Fumio Fujimura, who was an infielder and pitcher for the Hanshin Tigers. Nagashima also played baseball at his local high school in Chiba Prefecture, and on Rikkyo University baseball team in 1955–1957 as a third baseman. During this period, he also won the batting title for two consecutive years in the Tokyo Big6 Baseball League, in 1956 and 1957 respectively, and was given the Best Nine Award five seasons in a row at third base.

By his senior year, scouts from every professional team wanted to sign Nagashima, and the Nankai Hawks and Hiroshima Carp were particularly active in recruiting Nagashima. However, he instead signed with the Giants in 1958 for 18,000,000 yen, the highest salary for a baseball player at the time.

== Professional career ==
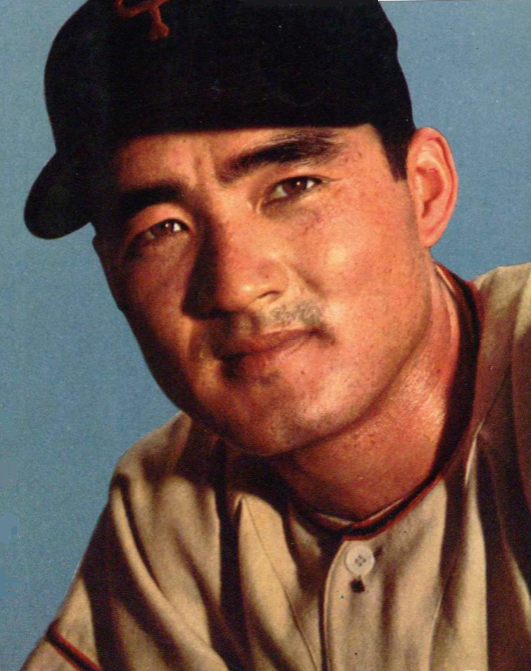
Nagashima in 1962

Nagashima made his professional debut in April 1958, and struck out in all four of his at-bats against Masaichi Kaneda (coincidentally, Sadaharu Oh also struck out in all of his at-bats in his debut game against Kaneda). Regardless, Nagashima became the team's clean-up hitter by mid-season, and the Giants won the league championship. Nagashima led the league in home runs (29) and runs batted in (92), and was subsequently awarded the rookie of the year award. He would have hit .300 with over 30 home runs and 30 steals in his rookie year, but he had one home run scratched off his record because he forgot to step on first base while rounding the bases after hitting a home run. Regardless, he had a batting average of .305 and also stole 37 bases. The Giants would ultimately make it to the 1958 Japan Series where they won the first three games; however, the opposing Nishitetsu Lions won the next four games in the seven-game series to overcome the 3–0 deficit. Nagashima scored two home runs in the series.

Nagashima played perhaps his most well-known game on June 25, 1959, when the Japanese emperor Hirohito attended a baseball game for the first time. Nagashima hit the game-winning home run off Minoru Murayama, and rookie Sadaharu Oh also had a home run in the game. The Yomiuri Giants cleanup consisting of Oh batting third, and Nagashima batting fourth, were nicknamed the "ON Hou" (translated to: "Oh-Nagashima Cannon") as Nagashima continued his hitting prowess, and Oh emerged as the best hitter in the league. The Giants won the league championship nine years in a row from 1965 to 1973, and Oh and Nagashima dominated the batting titles during this period. Nagashima won the season MVP award five times, and the Best Nine Award every single year of his career (a total 17 times). As a result of his dominant performances with the Giants, he was nicknamed "Mr. Pro Baseball" of Japan and "Mr. Giants".

After winning his sixth batting title in 1971, Nagashima suddenly fell into a hitting slump and no longer posted the batting statistics he had previous achieved in his younger years. The team wanted Nagashima to take over as manager after Tetsuharu Kawakami, who had led the team for 14 years, and Nagashima doubled as a player and a coach in his final seasons. In 1974, the Chunichi Dragons won the league championship, breaking the nine-year streak held by the Giants, and Nagashima played his final game on October 14 against the Dragons, grounding out to short for a double-play in his last at-bat. The game was followed by an elaborate retirement ceremony.

== Managerial career ==
Nagashima's appointment as manager of the Yomiuri Giants was announced on November 21, 1974, one month after his retirement, and was given control of the team in the same month. He recruited third baseman Davey Johnson from the majors, who became the first ever non-Japanese player to play for the Giants. However, the Giants ended the season in last place for the first time in the team's history. Despite this, Nagashima made further changes and the Giants quickly re-assumed their dominant position in the Central League, winning league championships in 1976 and 1977.

The Giants lost the pennant to the Yakult Swallows in 1978, and in the off-season of the same year, Nagashima and the Giants were involved in a huge controversy concerning the drafting of pitcher Suguru Egawa. The Giants ended in fifth place in 1979 with a 58–62 record. Criticism towards Nagashima increased, the team's owners decided to fire Nagashima during the 1980 season. Nagashima's immense popularity caused controversy among the fans after his firing, and the Yomiuri Shimbun experienced a significant decrease in publications after Nagashima's firing, with some people angered at its "misreporting" of the situation.

Nagashima returned to Yomiuri Giants for 1993 season, when Tsuneo Watanabe became a new owner of team in 1996 (Watanabe had a long-lasting affiliation with Nagashima). In the 1992 draft, he won the lottery to sign Hideki Matsui, who would become the new star of the Giants during Nagashima's second run as manager. The Giants won the Central League Pennant in 1994, 1996, and 2000, winning the Japan Series in 1994 and 2000, and he managed the team until 2001. For the 2000 Japan Series, Nagashima was managing against his former teammate, Sadaharu Oh, who was the manager for the Fukuoka Daiei Hawks.

In 2002, it was announced that he would lead Japanese Olympic baseball team. The team (consisting entirely of players from the Japanese professional leagues) beat China, Taiwan, and Korea to win the Asia tournament in November 2003, but Nagashima suffered a stroke in March 2004, and was unable to travel to the Athens Olympics. The team ended up with a bronze medal in the Olympics after losing to Australia.

== Personal life ==
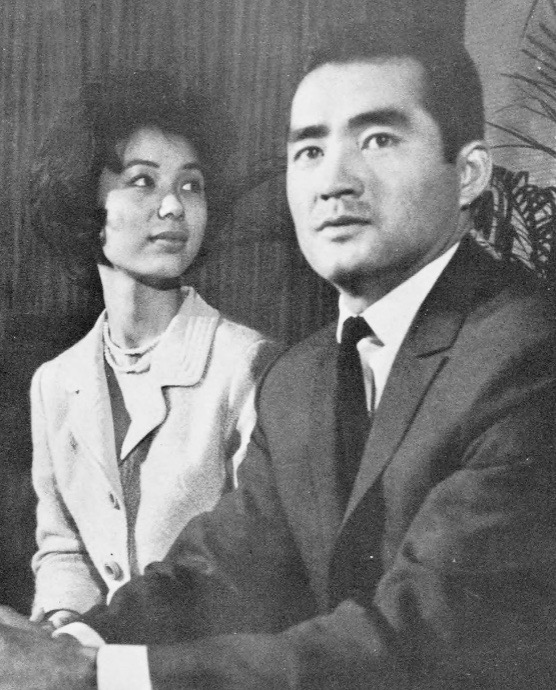
Shigeo Nagashima and Akiko Nishimura at the engagement press conference (November 26, 1964).

In October 1964, Nagashima covered 1964 Tokyo Summer Olympic Games as a special reporter for Hochi Shimbun newspaper alongside Sadaharu Oh, and while speaking with female companions, he met his then-girlfriend, Akiko Nishimura. They announced their engagement on November 26 of the same year. Two months later, they officially married on January 26, 1965. They couple have two sons and two daughters: His eldest son, Kazushige Nagashima, was a former Japanese professional baseball player, and later, he currently works as a sportscaster. He also played for Yomiuri Giants when his father was a manager, and later became as an actor and TV personality. His eldest daughter, Yuki, was a businesswoman and a former executive at Office N. His younger daughter, Mina, was a businesswoman and sportscaster. His youngest son, Masaoki, was a Japanese professional race-car driver and environmental activist. Kazushige had twin daughters with his unnamed wife in 2004, making Nagashima's grandfather.

His wife, Akiko Nagashima died of heart failure on September 18, 2007, at the age of 64.

== Recognition ==
His jersey number (3) is now a retired number for Yomiuri Giants.

On May 5, 2013, Nagashima was awarded the People's Honour Award, alongside Hideki Matsui whom he had picked in 1992 draft. In 2021, he received the Order of Culture for the first time as a former professional baseball player. In July 2021 during COVID-19 pandemic, Nagashima was one of torchbearers at 2020 Tokyo Summer Olympic Games.

In 2025, NPB, in tandem with the Yomiuri Shimbun and the Nippon Television Network, established the Shigeo Nagashima Award starting in 2026 that would honor a player each season "who excels in the three fundamentals of baserunning, hitting and fielding, and who captivates fans each season."

== Health problems and death ==
On September 7, 2022, Nagashima was hospitalized after suffering a brain hemorrhage. He died from pneumonia in Tokyo, on June 3, 2025, at the age of 89. He received a private funeral held in Tokyo on June 7.

== Career statistics ==
=== Player ===
Player statistics by season
	League																							
Club	Year	G	PA	AB	R	H	2B	3B	HR	TB	RBI	SB	CS	Sac	SF	BB	IBB	HBP	SO	GIDP	BA	OBP	SLG	OPS
Yomiuri Giants	1958	130	550	502	89	153	34	8	29	290	92	37	10	1	6	36	15	5	53	3	.305	.353	.578	.931
Yomiuri Giants	1959	124	526	449	88	150	32	6	27	275	82	21	6	0	3	70	17	4	40	9	.334	.426	.612	1.038
Yomiuri Giants	1960	126	524	452	71	151	22	12	16	245	64	31	12	0	2	70	32	0	28	8	.334	.422	.542	.964
Yomiuri Giants	1961	130	543	448	84	158	32	9	28	292	86	14	11	1	5	88	35	1	34	14	.353	.456	.652	1.108
Yomiuri Giants	1962	134	584	525	69	151	38	5	25	274	80	18	7	0	3	51	7	5	61	14	.288	.354	.522	.876
Yomiuri Giants	1963	134	577	478	99	163	28	6	37	314	112	16	3	0	10	86	18	3	30	14	.341	.437	.657	1.094
Yomiuri Giants	1964	133	566	459	81	144	19	6	31	268	90	13	2	0	6	96	15	5	34	8	.314	.433	.584	1.017
Yomiuri Giants	1965	131	560	503	70	151	23	5	17	235	80	2	6	0	5	50	12	2	42	16	.300	.363	.467	.830
Yomiuri Giants	1966	128	543	474	83	163	31	3	26	278	105	14	7	0	8	58	14	3	39	17	.344	.413	.586	.999
Yomiuri Giants	1967	122	515	474	65	134	25	3	19	222	77	2	3	0	3	37	4	1	37	24	.283	.334	.468	.802
Yomiuri Giants	1968	131	569	494	80	157	21	4	39	303	125	8	3	1	5	66	12	3	74	19	.318	.398	.613	1.011
Yomiuri Giants	1969	126	546	502	71	156	23	2	32	279	115	1	1	0	4	38	1	24	58	15	.311	.359	.556	.915
Yomiuri Giants	1970	127	525	476	56	128	22	2	22	220	105	1	2	0	9	40	1	0	52	15	.269	.320	.462	.782
Yomiuri Giants	1971	130	547	485	84	155	21	2	34	282	86	4	3	1	1	59	8	2	45	20	.320	.395	.581	.976
Yomiuri Giants	1972	125	520	448	64	119	17	0	27	217	92	3	2	0	8	63	11	1	34	23	.266	.352	.484	.836
Yomiuri Giants	1973	127	530	483	60	130	14	0	20	204	76	3	2	1	8	37	3	1	35	20	.269	.318	.422	.740
Yomiuri Giants	1974	128	476	442	56	108	16	1	15	171	55	2	1	1	4	24	0	5	33	18	.244	.288	.387	.675
Yomiuri Giants	Career total	2186	9201	8094	1270	2471	418	74	444	4369	1522	190	81	5	90	969	205	43	729	257	.305	.379	.540	.919
Source: Baseball-Reference

=== Managerial record ===
Managerial record by season
	League										
Club	Year	Pos	Game	W	L	D	WA	GD	HR	BA	ERA
Yomiuri Giants	1975	6th	130	47	76	7	.382	27.0	117	.236	3.53
Yomiuri Giants	1976	1st	130	76	45	9	.628	(2.0)	167	.280	3.58
Yomiuri Giants	1977	1st	130	80	46	4	.635	(15.0)	181	.280	3.48
Yomiuri Giants	1978	2nd	130	65	49	16	.570	3.0	136	.270	3.61
Yomiuri Giants	1979	5th	130	58	62	10	.483	10.5	154	.259	3.85
Yomiuri Giants	1980	2nd	130	61	60	9	.504	14.0	153	.243	2.95
Yomiuri Giants	1993	3rd	131	64	66	1	.492	16.0	105	.238	3.22
Yomiuri Giants	1994	1st	130	70	60	0	.538	(1.0)	122	.258	2.41
Yomiuri Giants	1995	3rd	131	72	58	1	.554	10.0	139	.2526	3.40
Yomiuri Giants	1996	1st	130	77	53	0	.592	(5.0)	147	.253	3.47
Yomiuri Giants	1997	4th	135	63	72	0	.467	20.0	150	.251	3.69
Yomiuri Giants	1998	3rd	135	73	62	0	.541	6.0	148	.267	3.74
Yomiuri Giants	1999	2nd	135	75	60	0	.556	6.0	182	.265	3.84
Yomiuri Giants	2000	1st	135	78	57	0	.578	(8.0)	203	.263	3.34
Yomiuri Giants	2001	2nd	140	75	63	2	.543	3.0	196	.271	4.45
Career total			1982	1034	889	59	.538	—	—	—	—
Source: Baseball-Reference

== See also ==
- List of top Nippon Professional Baseball home run hitters
- List of Nippon Professional Baseball players with 1,000 runs batted in
- List of Nippon Professional Baseball career hits leaders
