= Akiko Nakagami =

Japanese businesswoman

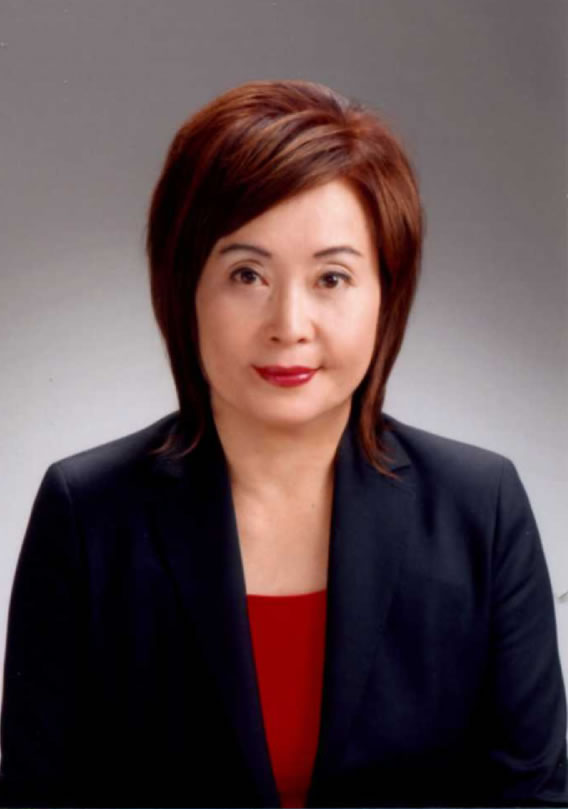
Director of the Administrative office Akiko Nakagami

Akiko Nakagami (中上 晶子, Akiko Nakagami) is a popular expert on family therapy and a business entrepreneur (former president of HAPPY PRINT), born in Tokyo, Japan.

After graduating from University in 1973, she went to the United States in order to study psychotherapy at the University of Houston–Clear Lake. Once she has advised U.S. President George H. W. Bush at the Houston summit in 1990.
She also has held prominent positions such as counsellor for Japan Aerospace Exploration Agency (JAXA). She has published some books about business and family therapy.

In April 2009 she assumed the Director of International Center of Tokyo Metropolitan University.

== Bibliography ==
Nakagami has authored two books:

- Therapy like Prelude ~ Family therapist is a conductor for the family to make harmony of the heart (2009)
- Published account by Akiko Nakagami (2005)
