= Akinori =

- Gender: Male

Origin
- Word/name: Japanese
- Meaning: Different meanings depending on the kanji used

Akinori (written: 聡徳, 昭徳, 昭典, 明徳, 明憲. 明訓, 明紀, 暉記, 晃教, 晶則 or 彰規) is a masculine Japanese given name. Notable people with the name include:

- Asashōryū Akinori (朝青龍 明徳, born 1980), Mongolian sumo wrestler
- Akinori Eto (江渡 聡徳, born 1955), Japanese politician
- Akinori Ichikawa (市川 暉記, born 1998), Japanese footballer
- Akinori Iwamura (岩村 明憲, born 1979), Japanese baseball player
- Akinori Kosaka (小阪 昭典, born 1975), Japanese footballer
- Akinori Mikami (三上 明紀, born 1969), Japanese footballer
- Akinori Nakagawa (中川 晃教, born 1982), Japanese singer-songwriter and actor
- Akinori Nakanishi (仲西 昭徳, born 1954), Japanese automobile designer
- Akinori Nakayama (中山 彰規, born 1943), Japanese gymnast
- Akinori Nishizawa (西澤 明訓, born 1976), Japanese footballer
- Akinori Noma (野間 昭典), Japanese electrophysiologist
- Akinori Ogata (尾形 明紀, born 1973), Japanese stock car racing driver
- Akinori Otsuka (大塚 晶則, born 1972), Japanese baseball player
- Akinori Yonezawa (米澤 明憲, born 1947), Japanese computer scientist

== Fictional characters ==
- Akinori Konoha (木葉秋紀), a character from the manga and anime Haikyu!! with the position of wing spiker from Fukurōdani Academy.
