= Motofuji Akiko =

Akiko Motofuji (1928–2003) was a Japanese dancer and dancing teacher. She was born in Tokyo in 1928.

== Education ==
From her childhood she studied ballet and modern dance. In 1947, Nobutoshi Tsuda dancing principal, and she established Asbestos Studio in 1950.

== Career ==
In 1955, in the International Dancing Contest held in Vienna, she won 4th prize in the individual performance section. She met Tatsumi Hijikata in 1956, and they started to perform on stage together, searching for a new way of expression using ballet and Neue Tanz techniques.

This was the basis of Butoh, an original expression which gazes at body and soul severely. Later they got married. She went back to the stage in 1992, performing the piece "Together with Tatsumi Hijikata", and after that made great works, one after another. Her original world showed such colorful features as charm, overflowing humor, and severely shaved form, but always with the theme "repeated life and death" at the bottom. She also tackled collaboration with artists of other genres: direction with engravers, improvisation with musicians, joint production with Magdalena Abakanowicz, etc., and continued searching for the possibility of new expression.

== Death ==
She died from hemopericardium on October 19, 2003.

== Quotes ==
One of her famous quotes is:

- "When viewing life, the blossoming of youth is beautiful, certainly. But in contrast, when something is withering, there's a beauty in that as well... is there not beauty within ugliness?"
