= May Shiga Hornback =

Japanese-American nurse

- Born: May 4, 1924; Seattle
- Died: July 6, 1976 (aged 52); Madison
- Alma mater: University of Wisconsin–Madison; Case Western Reserve University
- Occupation: Nurse
- Employer: University of Wisconsin–Extension; University of Wisconsin–Madison

May Shiga Hornback (May 4, 1924 – July 6, 1976) was an American nurse and nursing educator at the University of Wisconsin for twenty years (1956–1976). She was a pioneer in the use of technology to deliver nursing instruction.

== Life and career ==
May Shiga was born on May 4, 1924, in Seattle. A nisei, she was the daughter and youngest of five children of Japanese immigrants Henry Juro Shiga, the owner of a knit garments factory, and Sumi Hirano Shiga. She graduated from Garfield High School in 1941 and began studying nursing at Seattle University. After the US began its war with Japan, Shiga's father was incarcerated at the Fort Lincoln Internment Camp in North Dakota, due to being considered a "high risk" individual because of his factory and business trips to Japan. To avoid internment themselves, Shiga, her mother, and three of her siblings moved to Montana, and from there, Chicago.

In Chicago, Shiga resumed her nursing education, attending St. Xavier's College for two years. She married Vernon Hornback in 1944 and was forced to stop attending St. Xavier's as it was barred to married students at the time. They had two children, Vernon, Jr. and Frances, and moved to Pennsylvania and then Madison, Wisconsin. While employed as a nursing aide at the Lake View Tuburculosis Sanatorium in Madison, staff were impressed with her skill and encouraged her to complete her nursing education. She earned a B.S. in nursing from the University of Wisconsin Madison in 1954.

Hornback's first job as a full-fledged nurse was at the Veterans Administration Hospital in Madison. In 1956 she became a nursing instructor at the University of Wisconsin Madison, teaching nursing fundamentals and medical-surgical nursing. She took a leave of absence in 1957 to attend the Frances Payne Bolton School of Nursing at Case Western Reserve University, moving to Cleveland with her two children while her husband worked in Greenland. She graduated with her M.S. in 1958.

Hornback's use of technology to deliver nursing instruction began with video and she was one of the first nursing educators to create televised nursing courses. She completed a series of 17 half-hour videotapes for a nursing fundamentals course in 1963. She went on to produce numerous other videos, mostly for continuing education purposes. One notable video was 1970's A Talk With Linda, an interview with a young leukemia patient.

In 1965 she joined the nursing department at the University of Wisconsin Extension. There she directed nursing continuing education courses on Wisconsin's Educational Telephone Network (ETN). She also directed the Nursing Dial Access project, a taped library of nursing information. In 1973, she developed audiocasette courses for self-directed learning.

She earned her PhD from the University of Wisconsin Madison in 1970; her dissertation was "The Nature and Extent of Inservice Programs for Professional Nurses in General Hospitals in Wisconsin". The same year she was promoted to associate professor, and to full professor in 1972.

In 1976, she died of pancreatic cancer.

== Honors and legacy ==
Shortly after her death, her husband funded the May Shiga Hornback scholarship at University of Wisconsin Madison, a scholarship for returning nursing students.

In 1976, she was posthumously awarded the first service award from the Wisconsin Nurses' Association.

In 2010, she was one of a group of nisei students at who were awarded honorary degrees by Seattle University.
