= Akihiko =

- Gender: Male

Origin
- Origin: Japanese
- Meaning: Different meanings depending on the kanji used

Akihiko (written: 昭彦, 明彦, 彰彦 or 聡彦) is a masculine Japanese given name. Notable people with the name include:

- Akihiko Adachi (安達 明彦; born 1965), Japanese mixed martial artist
- Akihiko Hirata (平田 昭彦; 1927–1984), Japanese actor
- Akihiko Honda (本田 明彦; born 1947), Japanese boxing promoter
- Akihiko Hoshide (星出 彰彦; born 1968), Japanese engineer and astronaut
- Akihiko Ishizumi (石住 昭彦; born 1961), Japanese actor and voice actor
- Akihiko Kamikawa (神川 明彦; born 1966), Japanese footballer and manager
- Akihiko Koike (小池 昭彦; born 1973), Japanese racewalker
- Akihiko Kondo (近藤顕彦; born 1983), Japanese man known for marrying a fictional character
- Akihiko Kumashiro (熊代 昭彦; born 1940), Japanese politician
- Akihiko Matsuda (松田 明彦; born 22 June 1965), Japanese volleyball player
- Akihiko Matsui (松井 彰彦; born 1962), Japanese economist and professor
- Akihiko Matsui (松井 聡彦), Japanese video game developer
- Akihiko Mori (森 彰彦; 1966–1998), Japanese video game music composer
- Akihiko Nakamura (中村 明彦; born 1990), Japanese decathlete
- Akihiko Nakaya (中谷 明彦; born 1957), Japanese racing driver
- Akihiko Narita (成田 暁彦; born 1980), Japanese video game composer
- Akihiko Noro (野呂 昭彦; born 1946), Japanese politician
- Akihiko Ohya (大矢 明彦; born 1947), Japanese baseball manager
- Akihiko Okamura (岡村 昭彦; 1929–1985), Japanese photographer
- Akihiko Saito (斎藤 昭彦; 1961–2005), Japanese security guard
- Akihiko Shimizu (清水 明彦; born 1962), Japanese voice actor
- Akihiko Shiota (塩田 明彦; born 1961), Japanese film director and screenwriter
- Akihiko Suzuki (鈴木 昭彦; born 1945), Japanese bobsledder
- Akihiko Tago (多胡 昭彦; born 1932), Japanese astronomer
- Akihiko Takeshige (竹重 安希彦; born 1987), Japanese football goalkeeper
- Akihiko Tanaka (田中 明彦; born 1954), Japanese academic
- Akihiko Yamamoto (山本 明彦; born 1947), Japanese politician
- Akihiko Yamashita (山下 明彦; born 1966), Japanese animator
- Akihiko Yoshida (吉田 明彦; born 1967), Japanese video game artist

== Fictional characters ==
- Akihiko Kajii, a main character from Given
- Akihiko Kayaba, an antagonist from Sword Art Online
- Akihiko Nirei, a character from Wind Breaker
- Akihiko Sanada, a main character in the video game Persona 3
- Akihiko Usami ("Usagi"), a character from Junjo Romantica: Pure Romance
