= Taiga Matsuo =

Japanese baseball player (born 1998)

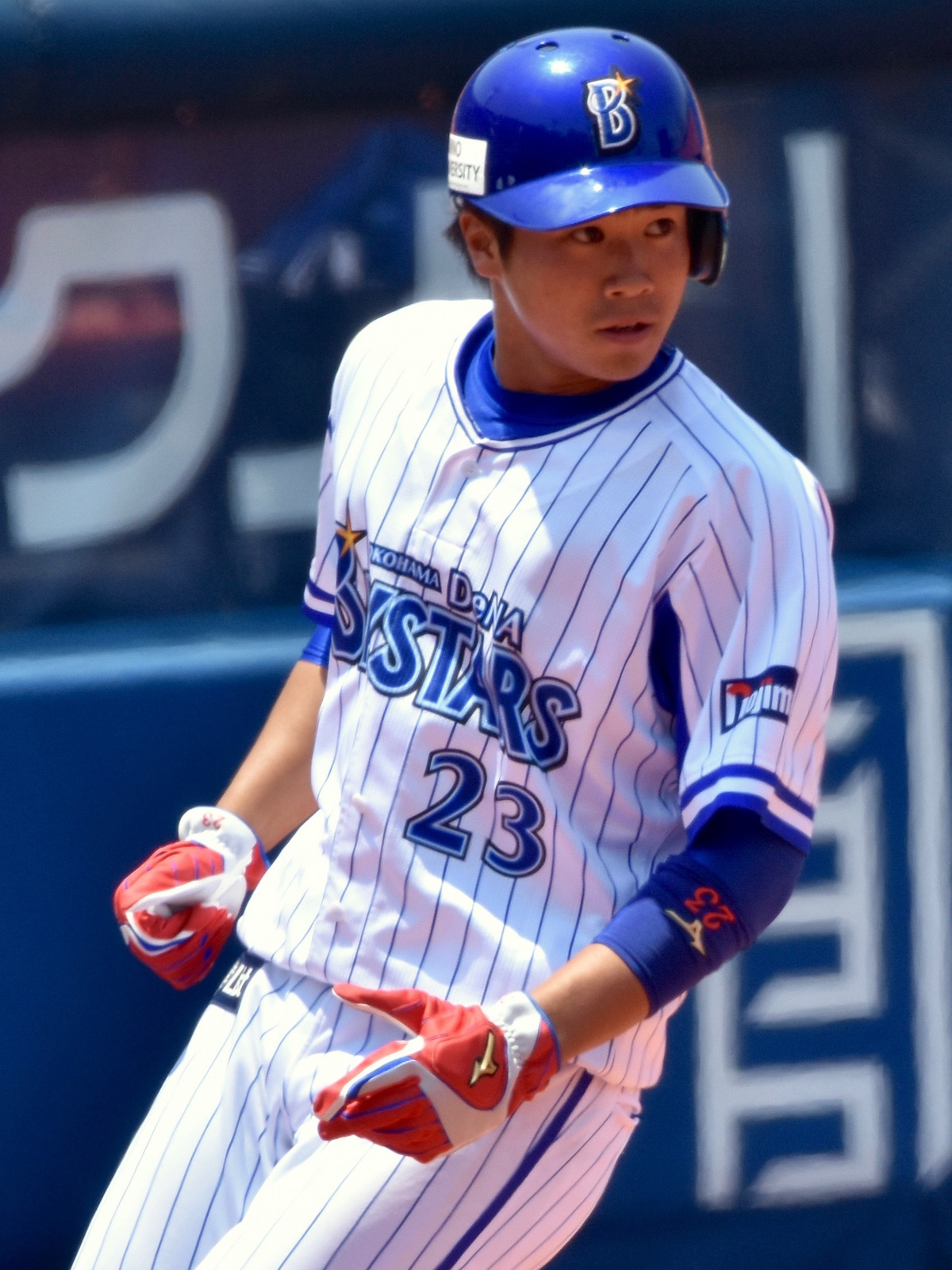
- Matsuo with the Yokohama DeNA BayStars

Ryukyu Blue Oceans – No. 23
- Infielder
- Born: April 5, 1998 (age 28); Ibaraki, Osaka, Japan
- Bats: Right Throws: Right

Teams
- Yokohama DeNA BayStars (2017–2019); Ryukyu Blue Oceans (2020-present)

Taiga Matsuo (松尾 大河, Matsuo Taiga; born April 5, 1998, in Ibaraki, Osaka, Japan) is a professional Japanese baseball player. He plays infielder for the Yokohama DeNA BayStars.
