= Tsuneo Watanabe =

Japanese businessman and journalist (1926–2024)

- 渡邉 恒雄
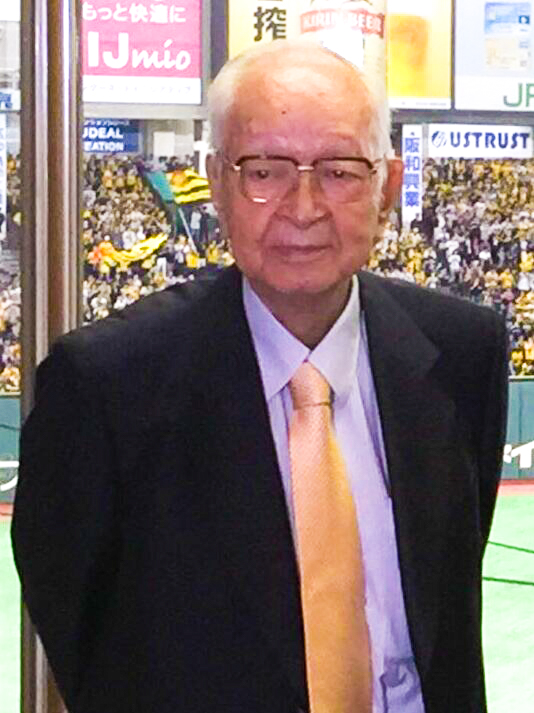
- Watanabe at Tokyo Dome in March 2018

Personal details
- Born: 30 May 1926 Tokyo, Empire of Japan (Now Japan)
- Died: 19 December 2024 (aged 98) Tokyo, Japan
- Education: Faculty of Letters in University of Tokyo
- Occupation: Journalist; Businessman; Newspaper editor and executive
- Known for: Yomiuri Shimbun; Yomiuri Giants; Yomiuriland

Tsuneo Watanabe (渡邉 恒雄, Watanabe Tsuneo; May 30, 1926 – December 19, 2024) was a Japanese journalist, businessman, and newspaper editor and executive, who served as a Managing Editor of Yomiuri Shimbun from January 1985 until his death in December 2024. He also served as a Representative Director and Managing Editor of Yomiuri Shimbun Holdings, which published a largest Japanese daily newspaper, Yomiuri Shimbun, and substantially controls the largest Japanese television commercial network Nippon Television Network, and as well as his owner, director, and chief advisor of Yomiuri Giants baseball team, his owner of Japanese amusement park Yomiuriland, and the chairman of Japan Newspaper Publishers and Editors Association. He was best known by his two nicknames Nabetane and Watatsune by those connected to Yomiuri Shimbun.

Watanabe played a prominent role in Japanese political, cultural, and professional sports arenas. At the time of his death, his legacy was surrounded by many numerous Japanese politicians, celebrities, sport players including professional baseball players, such as Shigeo Nagashima, film and television directors, producers, and stars, video game developers, and among others.

== Early life and education ==
Tsuneo Watanabe was born on May 30, 1926 in Tokyo, Japan, to his parents, Heikichi and Hana Watanabe. He is one of the third of five siblings, three sisters and one brother. In 1934 when Tsuneo was 8 years old, his father, Heikichi Watanabe, who worked at Fudo Savings Bank (The predecessor of former Kyowa Bank (Now Resona Bank)), where he suffered from vomited blood in the entranceway of their home in Suginami Ward, Tokyo, and then he unfortunately died of stomach cancer, a week later, at the age of 47. While the rental income from 11 rental properties left by his father, which provided a sufficient income for the immediate living expenses, the loss of their breadwinner left his family with heavy worries about their future. His mother, Hana Watanabe, who struggled to recovered from the loss of her husband, Heikichi.

During Asia-Pacific War in World War II, Watanabe served as an Imperial Japanese Army, but later noted that he was subjected to harsh treatment, which included daily beatings. He managed to enroll in Tokyo University before the war ended. Watanabe was planning to be the first to surrender if American Armed Forces landed to Japan. However, he prepared for the possibility of being captured, but he carried three philosophical books with him at all times. In case, he was able to be placed in a prisoner-of-war camp in Chiba Prefecture or elsewhere across Kanto region.

Watanabe received notice of his discharge in early August 1945, and was discharged on Wednesday morning, August 15 of the same year. At the end of Asia-Pacific war and hostilities in World War II, Watanabe joined Japanese Communist Party and opposed Japanese imperial system. His military service lasted only about five months. His political views was changed with the times. He left from Japanese Communist Party due to its policy of prioritizing discipline over individual initiative. He adopted more conservative political views. He continued to hold lifelong opposition towards Japan's role in World War II, and opposed his things, such as visited by Japanese prime ministers to the war-linked Yasukuni Shrine.

After his discharge, Watanabe returned to rested with his family in Kanto Region. Three months later, he also returned to the University of Tokyo, where he graduated from the Faculty of Letters with a degree in philosophy in 1949.

== Career ==
=== Journalist and newspaper career ===
At the first time, Watanabe joined Yomiuri Shimbun in early spring 1950. Starting from 1952 until his death in 2024, he served as a reporter in Japanese newspaper's Political News Department, covering Japanese prime ministers from Shigeru Yoshida through Shinzo Abe and Fumio Kishida to Shigeru Ishiba. He was particularly favored by Banboku Ōno and emerged as a prominent political journalist. He became as a member of newspaper's Washington bureau, and later, he was appointed as a director and chairman of editorial board at Yomiuri Shimbun in 1979 after serving as one of the newspaper's political news editors. In this role, he helped encourage Yomiuri Shimbun to hold an even more conservative ideology.

=== Deep ties with Japanese politicians ===
Watanabe was also an advisor to two then-Japanese Prime Ministers Yasuhiro Nakasone and Toshiki Kaifu. As a result, Yomiuri Shimbun began writing articles with a pro-government stance. Some voices criticized it as an improper relationship between Watanabe and Nakasone.

In 1991, Watanabe became as the president and editor-in-chief of Yomiuri Shimbun. He retained this position until his death. Under Watanabe's leadership, the daily circulation of The Yomiuri Shimbun topped 10 million by 1994. He became president and editor-in-chief of Yomiuri Shimbun Holdings in 2002, and later chairman and editor-in-chief in 2004. Referring to himself as "the last dictator," Watanabe's leadership over The Yomiuri Shimbun was controversial. Among the things he did was not allow the newspaper to carry stories that contradicted its editorial tone and excluded anyone who objected it. As a head of Yomiuri Shimbun, Watanabe was at the forefront of news industry.

In an interview with Kyodo News in 1990s, Watanabe boasted that he said: "You can't change the world if you don't have power." He also said: "Fortunately or unfortunately, I have 10 million circulation (of daily). I can move Japanese prime minister with that. Japanese political parties are in my hands and reductions in income and corporate taxes were carried out as Yomiuri newspaper reported. Nothing is more delightful than that."

By 2010, Yomiuri Shimbun was recognized by Guinness World Records, which having the highest daily newspaper circulation in the world, and also as the only newspaper with a morning circulation in an excess of 10 million copies.

=== Professional sports team owner ===
When Japan Professional Soccer League was established, he insisted that each football club should put each company's name on the football clubs. Usually, in Europe and the United States, each professional team or club put each city's name on the team. In August 2004, Watanabe resigned as Yomiuri Giants (owned by the Yomiuri Shimbun) president after it was revealed that the Giants baseball club had violated scouting rules by paying ¥2 million to pitching prospect Yasuhiro Ichiba. Ten months later, Watanabe was hired as chairman of the team.

In 2004, Japanese professional baseball held its first-ever strike. Watanabe faced public criticism for remarking to Atsuya Furuta, a head of players' union, saying: "You are mere players. You should know your places."

== Personal life ==
Watanabe has never married any wives nor children. He stated that he is single man, and has found a contentment in his newspaper life. As he remains singlehood until his death from pneumonia on December 19, 2024, at age 98, Watanabe focused on his journalist and newspaper career by choice, such as a chief-in-editor of Yomiuri Shimbun and his owners of Yomiuri Giants and Yomiuriland.

== Later life and death ==
Japan had concerned by the way, unfinished business concerning the war and continued to hinder Japan's progress, Watanabe set up a War Responsibility Re-examination Committee at Yomiuri Shimbun to undertake a 14-month investigation into the causes of Asia-Pacific War in World War II. The committee concluded that is "not only high-ranking government leaders, generals, and admirals should be shoulder the blame."

Watanabe had close ties with a number of powerful Japanese political figures, including three former Japanese prime ministers Yasuhiro Nakasone (1918–2019), Toshiki Kaifu (1931–2022), and Shinzo Abe (1954–2022), as well as former Tokyo Prefectural Governor Shintaro Ishihara (1932–2022). Under his leadership, Yomiuri Shimbun presented Watanabe as its first draft amendments to the Constitution of Japan Act (1947). He formed a united front with Nakasone to alter the war-renouncing supreme law. Under Abe, Watanabe headed an advisory council on Japan's secrecy law from 2014 to 2016.

Despite his advancing age, Watanabe regularly showed up to his office from Yomiuri Shimbun until late November 2024. Although he suffered from pneumonia in early December of the same year and then received his treatment at a hospital. However, he continued to work until very end of his entirely life soon, even going over editorial manuscripts until a few days before his death. Watanabe died at 2:00 a.m. on Thursday morning, December 19, 2024, at the age of 98. Following his death, many numerous Japanese politicians, celebrities, sport players, film and television directors, producers, and stars, journalists and presenters, video game developers, and among others were pay tribute to Watanabe, including Japanese Imperial Family: Emperor Emeritus Akihito, Empress Emerita Michiko, Emperor Naruhito and Empress Masako, and Prince Fumihito and Princess Kiko of Akishino; as well as then-ongoing Japanese Prime Minister Shigeru Ishiba and four former Japanese prime ministers: Yoshiro Mori, Junichiro Koizumi, Fumio Kishida, and Yoshihiko Noda; Tokyo Prefectural Governor Yuriko Koike; retired Yomiuri Giants baseball player Shigeo Nagashima; former Sino-Japanese baseball manager Sadaharu Oh; and among others.

His funeral and farewell ceremony were held at Imperial Hotel in Tokyo, on February 25, 2025. Many numerous individual delegations were included Princess Takamado, Princess Tsuguko, then-Japanese Prime Minister Shigeru Ishiba, two former prime ministers Fumio Kishida and Yoshiro Mori, and among other various guests, such as Japanese baseball groups. Later, they also toured an exhibition, which commemorating Tsuneo Watanabe's life and legacy at the same building.

== Honors ==
- Grand Cordon of the Order of the Rising Sun (2008)
- Senior Third Rank (2025)
