= Matsuo Morizumi =

Imperial Japanese Navy admiral

- 森住 松雄
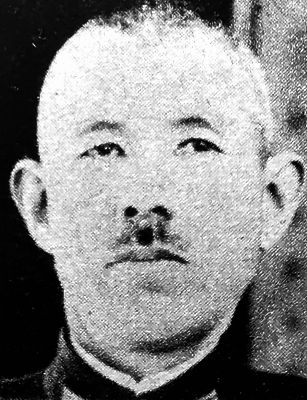
- Born: May 24, 1891; Kanagawa Prefecture, Japan
- Died: September 3, 1945 (aged 54); Tokyo, Japan
- Education: Naval Engineer Academy
- Military career
- Allegiance: Empire of Japan
- Branch: Imperial Japanese Navy
- Service years: 1913–1945
- Rank: Vice Admiral
- Units: Tsugaru, Tsukuba, Haruna, Yamashiro, Ume, 2nd Special Task Fleet
- Commands: Maizuru Naval Arsenal
- Conflicts: World War I World War II
- Other work: Inspector General of Munitions; Osaka Naval Defense District Superintendent of Shipbuilding and Ordnance

Vice Admiral Matsuo Morizumi (森住 松雄, Morizumi Matsuo; May 24, 1891 – September 3, 1945) was an Imperial Japanese Navy admiral and the Inspector General of munitions, Kinki district, Tokyo, at the end of World War II.

== Birth and career ==
Matsuo Morizumi was born 24 May 1891 in the Kanagawa Prefecture.

Morizumi was a graduate of the 22nd Naval Engineer Academy class. He began service as a Midshipman/Engineering on 15 December 1913 aboard training cruiser Tsugaru. On 18 July 1914 he was assigned to the Armored cruiser Tsukuba, with promotion on 1 December to Engineer Sublieutenant (Ensign).

Morizumi next was assigned aboard Kongō-class battlecruiser Haruna on 12 February 1915, and thence to the not-yet commissioned Fusō-class battleship Yamashiro on 27 October 1916 with promotion to Lieutenant junior grade (engineer) on 1 December.

On 7 February 1917, Morizumi transferred to the Ume, one of the ten Kaba-class destroyers hastily (but well) built by seven Japanese yards to fulfill Japan's allied commitments in the Great War. On 20 February 1918, he was assigned as Assistant Staff Officer of the 2nd Special Task Fleet, a task force of Japanese destroyers deployed to Malta in the Mediterranean as part of Japan's assistance to the Allied war effort under the Anglo-Japanese Alliance.

Morizumi served as commanding officer of Maizuru Naval Arsenal in Kyoto Prefecture, from 10 March 1944 to 1 May 1945.

When the war ended, Morizumi was the Osaka naval defense district superintendent of shipbuilding and ordnance.

== Death ==
He committed seppuku, ritual suicide, in his office in Tokyo on the night of 3 September 1945, the day after Japan's unconditional surrender to Allied forces.
