= Takashi Matsuo =

Takashi Matsuo may refer to:

- Takashi Matsuo (actor, born 1960), Japanese tarento and actor
- Takashi Matsuo (actor, born 1996), Japanese actor and vocalist
