= Akiko Matsuo =

Japanese engineer

Akiko Matsuo is a Japanese engineer specialising in computational fluid dynamics. She is a professor at Keio University.

== Biography ==
Matsuo was born in Saga Prefecture. She studied mathematics for her undergraduate degree at Tsuda University and became interested in computational fluid dynamics during her postgraduate studies in aeronautical engineering at Nagoya University. After graduating, she worked at a research institute that specialised in supercomputers, and completed further study at Princeton University in the United States.

She is a member of the Aircraft and Railway Accident Investigation Commission of the Ministry of Land, Infrastructure and Transportation.
