= Akiko Shiga =

Akiko Shiga (志賀 暁子, Shiga Akiko; June 17, 1910 – September 17, 1990) was a Japanese actress and singer.

== Early life ==
Shiga was born in Kyoto on June 17, 1910. Her father was a government bureaucrat, and in 1924 the family had to move to Taipei when he was transferred to the Government-General of Taiwan. Shiga later attended a girl's high school in Nagasaki. After graduation she moved to Setagaya to live with her father and his new wife (her mother died while she was in Nagasaki). She wanted to study music, but her father opposed it so she left home and became a dancer at a dance hall in Nihonbashi.

== Career ==
Shiga joined the Shinkō Kinema in 1933 and debuted in the film Atarashiki Ten later that year. She had a relationship with the director, Yutaka Abe, and became pregnant. She aborted the child in 1934 after finishing her next film, Muteki. She starred in four more films, which were directed by Minoru Murata. However, in 1935 she and the midwife who performed her abortion were arrested for breaking the Criminal Abortion Law of 1907. Shiga was sentenced a three-year suspended sentence on November 25, 1936.

Shiga's arrest and imprisonment started a nationwide conversation about abortion. The prosecutor in her case, Daikichi Imoto, had compared her to Masako, the protagonist of Yūzō Yamamoto's novel Onna no Isshō. He said that Shiga chose to abort her child because she lacked maternal love, unlike Masako, who raised her child. Yamamoto himself pointed out in a response in the Tokyo Asahi Shinbun that Masako's situation was very different from Shiga's, because Masako was a doctor with a large inheritance, while Shiga was a working woman without family support. Many other writers were similarly sympathetic. A law was passed in 1937 to support single mothers like Shiga would have been.

Shiga returned to the screen in 1937 in Utsukushiki taka. She starred in three more films in 1938, but was not able to play the femme fatale roles she played before the war because of increased government censorship. Her scandal also meant that her attempts to play lighter heroines were overshadowed. She joined a theater troupe and became a stage actress instead. After the troupe was dissolved by the government in August 1940, she married and had a son. Her husband died in 1948. Shiga appeared in several other films, and her final role was in 1957.

== Bibliography ==
- Shiga, Akiko (1957). われ過ぎし日に 哀しき女優の告白. 学風書院.
