= Akiko Ichikawa =

American journalist

- 市川 明子
- Born: Sagamihara, Japan
- Education: University School of Nashville; Brown University; Hunter College
- Occupations: performance artist; editor; visual artist; art writer; case manager
- Notable work: Sometimes They Listen
- Awards: Artists Space Independent Project Grant, Djerassi Artists Residency, Public Art Fund, Brown University, Robert Rauschenberg Foundation, Rhizome

Akiko Ichikawa (市川 明子, Ichikawa Akiko, or アキーコー・イーチカーワ, Akiko Ichikawa) is a transdisciplinary artist, editor, and writer-activist based in New York City. She has written on contemporary art and culture for Flash Art, Art in America, Hyperallergic, and zingmagazine. Ichikawa's article on the photography of Dorothea Lange, Toyo Miyatake, and Ansel Adams at Manzanar became popular in fall 2016, following comments by a spokesperson of a Trump-supporting PAC on Fox News.

== Early life and education ==
Born in Sagamihara, Kanagawa, Akiko Ichikawa emigrated to the United States with her family, via San Francisco, when she was three. Her brother is menswear designer Kenshin Ichikawa. Ichikawa and her siblings grew up in the suburbs of Boston and Nashville, and she took courses in photography, painting, and drawing at Vanderbilt University while still in high school.

Ichikawa attended Brown University concentrating in Visual Art under Annette Lemieux, Leslie Bostrom, and Walter Feldman, graduating with honors. She moved to New York City four days later, using the award money from the college's Roberta Joslin Art award to pay for her first month's rent on a studio apartment in the East Village. After working in academic publishing for 18 months, she entered Hunter's MFA program where she studied under Gretchen Bender, Robert Morris, and Andrea Blum, among others, and earned a scholarship to study in the MA Sculpture department at the Slade School of Art in London and an award to organize a panel on new painting.

== Work ==
Ichikawa's conceptually-based artwork exists as performance, installation and net.art. The performances include a series of site-specific gifting work titled Limited, Limited Edition in which she paints t-shirts with Japanese text informed by the neighborhood in which she gives the shirts away at low-cost: either translations of message shirts she saw in or inspired by the area. She presented the first iteration of this work at Socrates Sculpture Park, in Long Island City, Queens; then in Performa at Artists Space, the next in Jamaica, Queens; then at the Incheon Women Artists' Biennale in Incheon, South Korea; at On Stellar Rays gallery on the Lower East Side; in three locations in Newark, New Jersey for Aljira Center for Contemporary Art, in a school yard in East Harlem; on 14th Street, Manhattan, as a part of the Art in Odd Places performance festival, and on H Street NE in Washington D.C. For Bad Kanji, she painted temporary kanji tattoos on viewers at the Spring/Break Art Show in 2015, held in the historic office spaces above New York City's James A. Farley Post Office. The work was reviewed favorably. She has additionally exhibited her work in The Hague, Berlin, Philadelphia, St. Paul, Minnesota, and in Sweden, and is currently based in New York City.

Ichikawa also operates as an art historian, having enacted two of Fluxus-member Alison Knowles's event scores, namely #5 Wounded Furniture and #3 Nivea Cream Piece. The latter was live-blogged online and well-received, with Hyperallergic's Kyle Chayka writing that it was "definitely among [his] favorites." In 2015, Ichikawa wrote about the Japanese American incarceration through the photography of Dorothea Lange, Ansel Adams, and Toyo Miyatake for Hyperallergic, which became popular, shared over 8,000 times on Facebook. In 2018, she reminded New York art world readers about the Golden Venture incident, which marked the start of contemporary punitive U.S. immigration policies at the presidential level, under President Clinton. In 2020, she wrote on newly revealed information on the life of Abstract Expressionist Clyfford Still for Art in America.

In the 2000s Ichikawa created an Internet art piece that simulated a series of imagined art installations. The multi-hyphenate has also created a series of Facebook groups themed around food organized by color, touching upon issues of cultural identity, food sourcing, gentrification, environmental concerns, and greenwashing while sharing nutrition and cost-cutting tips: I ♥ Yellow Food, I ♥ Orange Food, I ♥ Red Food, I ♥ Green Food, and I ♥ Blue Food. While not supportive of Facebook's history of massive online-privacy violations, its carrying the 2016 Republican National Convention, and, along with other mainstream media outlets, its other roles in the empowerment of Trump's 2016 presidential candidacy, she nevertheless viewed the social media platform as an effective, user-friendly way to include as many participants as possible, in as short a time as possible. She has lately turned to Instagram, bought by Facebook in 2012.

Ichikawa's artwork before 2005 was primarily in installation art, built around the placement and assembly of basic construction materials in galleries and other spaces. She presented one such piece as her solo exhibition at Momenta Art and another at Andrew Kreps gallery in a group exhibition curated by Dean Daderko, now a curator at the Contemporary Arts Museum Houston. The series evolved into a Net.art piece, Where Do We Come From? What Are We? Where Are We Going? that was stored on Rhizome.org.

== Writing ==
Ichikawa has written on contemporary art for Flash Art on the work of Ken Lum, Laurel Nakadate, Dan Peterson, Yasue Maetake, and, for NY Arts magazine, the work of British artists Jane and Louise Wilson and for zingmagazine, the work of Iranian-American public artist Siah Armajani.

In 2015 Ichikawa wrote about the photography of Dorothea Lange, Ansel Adams, and Toyo Miyatake and the Japanese American incarceration for Hyperallergic. The article received its biggest spike in interest (about 5,000 more Facebook shares, totaling 8,000) after the spokesman of a Trump-supporting PAC, in early November 2016, cited the incarceration as precedent for a Muslim registry on Fox News. In 2018, she reviewed an exhibition of folded paper work by the Golden Venture migrants who were held in York, Pennsylvania that was presented at Chinatown's Museum of Chinese in America.

Ichikawa also wrote about the closing of the Manhattan Tekserve store, the performance by a group of young area Native American musicians at Rutgers University in 2016, and cowrote about the work of young artists of Asian descent in a New York City-based performance art festival the next year. In 2018, in addition to writing about the paper-folding work of the Golden Venture migrants for Art in America online, she served as the social media writer for #callresponse during its New York City exhibition run at EFA Project Space.

In 2019 Ichikawa wrote about her experience of being sexually harassed at a neighborhood laundromat undergoing gentrification pressure for a Chinatown-based teen activist zine. Ichikawa also opined to the New York Times on American environmentalist and leader of 350.org Bill McKibben's critique of Tatiana Schlossberg’s book, Inconspicuous Consumption. She wrote that "his insistence on the 'correct' way to fight what we now know to be impending world disaster is laughable."

The next year Ichikawa wrote on the life of Clyfford Still for Art in America as seen though a documentary released that year on the Abstract Expressionist and on a 2018 performance work by African-American multimedia artist Ama Be (Nana Ama Bentsi-Enchill).

== Awards and residencies ==
- 2024 Puffin Foundation Grant
- 2022 Rauschenberg Medical Emergency Grant, Robert Rauschenberg Foundation
- 2021 City Artist Corps Grant, NYFA and the City of New York Department of Cultural Affairs, with the Mayor's Office of Media and Entertainment and Queens Theatre, New York City
- 2013 Cuts and Burns Residency, Outpost Artists Resources, Ridgewood, Queens
- 2003 Longwood Arts Project and Residency, the Bronx
- 2002 Middlebrook-Sugano Fellowship, Djerassi Artists Residency, California
- 2002 Change Inc. Emergency Grant, Robert Rauschenberg Foundation
- 2000 Independent Project Grant, Artists Space, New York City

== Catalogues ==
- The 21st Century, the Feminine Century, the Century of Diversity and Hope. Incheon Women Artists' Biennale Organizing Committee, South Korea. 2009.
- Jamaica Flux '07: Workplaces & Windows. JCAL, Queens. 2008. ISBN 978-0976285366.
- Jennifer Liese, ed. (2007). Performa: New Visual Art Performance. Performa. ISBN 978-1424314980.
- Michael Ashkin, ed. (2005). Momenta Art: 1999 to 2004. Momenta Art. ISBN 0-9678868-1-3.
- Jamaica Flux. JCAL, Queens. 2004. ISBN 0-9762853-0-4.
- Jochen Gerz, ed. (2004). De Anthologie der Kunst. Dumont Verlag, Cologne.
- Jung Lee Sanders, ed. (2003). Art Projects International: Ten Years. API, New York. ISBN 0-9746915-9-3.

== Family ==
Akiko Ichikawa's younger sister, Yoko, is a fashion design teacher at Oakland Technical High School. Ichikawa's younger brother, Kenshin Ichikawa, founded and designed Rocksmith streetwear, which has done collaborative lines with the Wu Tang Clan, Malcolm X's daughters, and a music video with Future. The label has also been worn by all of the major male American hip-hop stars. Yoko is a graduate of Wesleyan University, where she majored in West African dance; Kenshin is a graduate of Columbia University and is married to former UC Berkeley Food Institute executive director Nina F. Ichikawa.

== See also ==
Akiko (given name)
Culture of New York City

== See also ==
- Limited, Limited Edition (Incheon) on Vimeo
- Sharing Kanji on Vimeo
- Interview by Native Art Department International
- Audience reaction to a 2011 performance of Alison Knowles's #3 Nivea Cream Piece on YouTube
