= Split Pavilion =

Former sculpture in Carlsbad, California

Coordinates: 33.1554°N 117.3511°W

Split Pavilion was a public sculpture by the American artist Andrea Blum, located in Carlsbad, California. Installed in 1992, the sculpture was the subject of significant local controversy. It was ultimately removed by the city of Carlsbad in 1999.

== History ==
=== Commissioning and installation ===
Blum was commissioned in 1987 by the city of Carlsbad to create the work. Th design, fabrication and installation was completed in 1992. Blum received a fee of US$35,000 for the work, and the sculpture cost US$350,000 to install. Prior to the work's installation, the city presented the artist and a model of the work to local merchants and residents, and mailed out a brochure describing the proposed work.

The complete piece, titled Split Pavilion, was located on 7500 square feet of land on a bluff overlooking the Pacific Ocean at the corner of Carlsbad Boulevard and Ocean Street. The work was composed of concrete, reflecting pools and Carpobrotus plants, partially enclosed by an eight-foot tall galvanized iron fence.

=== Controversy ===
The fence component of the work proved to be controversial among local residents, gaining the nickname "the bars".

A petition to remove the fence component of the work garnered 7000 signatures by April 1992. Some residents affixed bumper stickers to their cars with the phrase "remove the bars".

An April 1992 "peacemaking committee" was held with Blum, city representatives and 100 citizens in attendance. During the meeting numerous proposals were made, including requests to the Blum to redesign or remove the work. Blum offered only minor concessions to the installed design.

=== Removal ===
In June 1998, Carlsbad citizens voted overwhelmingly to remove the work. In January 1999, almost seven years after its installation, the city removed the sculpture. The cost to demolish the work was US$140,000. Portions of the original fence were reused as railings on a bleacher at a local high school, while some shorter sections were sold as souvenirs of the controversy. The total expenditures of the city of Carlsbad on Split Pavilion were estimated at over US$500,000.
