= Julia Csekö =

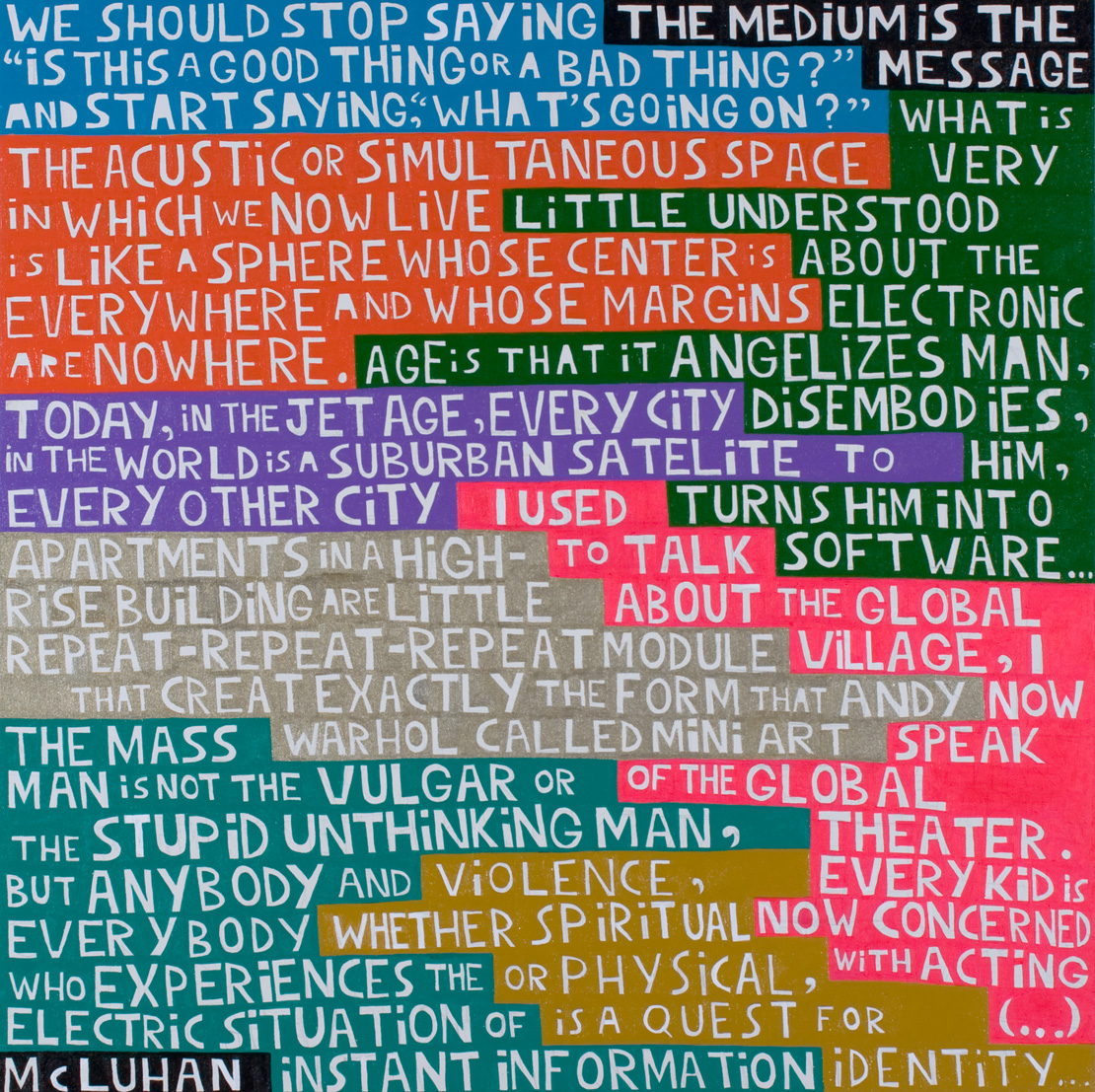
Julia Csekö, "A Coney Island of the Mind-Marshal McLuhan," 2006, acrylic on canvas, 130.0 x 130.0 cm. Collection of the Morris and Helen Belkin Art Gallery, The University of British Columbia. Photo: Howard Ursuliak

Julia Csekö is an Artist, Educator and Independent Curator having worked at multiple learning, non-profits, and cultural organizations, including Montserrat College of Art, ICA Boston, Peabody Essex Museum, and the Museum of Fine Arts, Boston.

== Early life and education ==
Born in Colorado to Brazilian parents on self-exile during the Brazilian military dictatorship, Csekö grew up in Rio Rio de Janeiro, Brazil. She received a Master of Fine Arts (MFA), from the School of the Museum of Fine Arts at Tufts University in 2013, an Associate Degree in Art and Philosophy from the Pontifical University of Rio de Janeiro, PUC-Rio in 2008 and a BFA in Fine Arts from the Federal University of Rio, majoring in Sculpture in 2004.

== Career ==
Csekö cites Educator and thinker Paulo Freire, and his Critical Pedagogy and dialectical approach to education as a reference for her art practice. She views art not as a static object, but an open dialog and collaborative process."

Csekö's work is in the permanent collection of the Tufts University Art Galleries Morris and Helen Belkin Art Gallery and the Gilberto Chateaubriand Collection at the Museum of Modern Art, Rio de Janeiro. and at Emerson College, in Boston MA.

Csekö has received the NAS Creative Community Fellowship, Our Energy Future Grant, ALAANA Creative County Grant, Salem Public Artist in Residence 2024 Award, SMFA Traveling Fellow GrantBoston Center for the Arts AiR, a Collective Futures Tufts Art Galleries Warhol Foundation Grant, JArts Be The Change Award, Randolph, and Newton LCC Grants, and a Somerville LCC Ambassadorship. She is also invited back to MASSMoCA in 2025 as an Alumni Resident. In 22’ Cseko was a Somerville LCC grantee, a CTV MassCreative Fellow, and a Somerville Museum Community Curator, at the Somerville Museum 2021, an Artcubator Artist Residency at the Umbrella Center for the Arts 2020–21. In the summer of 2020, she was invited as a Visiting Artist by Emerson College to create a site-specific mural for the Piano Row Campus, featuring the words of late Congressman John Lewis. In addition, she has a public mural on view at Winter Place, downtown Boston, commissioned by the Boston Downtown BID, and created in partnership with the Boston Literary District.[1] In 2018 Csekö was invited to the Assets for Artists MassMoCA residency program where she further investigated her multi-disciplinary practice as a sculptor, painter, and performer.

== Awards ==
- NAS Creative Community Fellowship New England 2026
- Mosesian Center for the Arts AiR
- Our Energy Future Grant 2026
- MCC Creative Individuals 2026
- Natick and Waltham LCC Grants 2026
- MCC Festivals Grant 2025
- Salem, Marblehead, and Swampscot LCC Grants 2025
- ALAANA Creative County Grant 2024
- SMFA Traveling Fellow Grant 2023-2024
- Salem Public Artist in Residence
- Boston Center for the Arts AiR 2023
- Collective Futures Tufts Art Galleries Warhol Foundation Grant 2022-23
- Be The Change JArts Awardee 2023
- Somerville LCC Cultural Ambassador 2023
- Newton and Randolph LCC Grantee 2023
- MassCreative CTV Fellow 2022
- Somerville Museum Community Curator Grantee 2022
- Sculpture Space Air 2022
- Somerville Arts Council Fellowship 2021
- Community Curator award at the Somerville Museum 2021Somerville Arts Council Fellowship 2021
- Community Curator award at the Somerville Museum 2021
- Artcubator Artist in Residence at the Umbrella Center for the Arts
- Artist in Residence MAssMoCA, 2018.
- Walter Feldman Fellowship for Emerging Artists, 2015–2016. The fellowship culminated in her first American, solo exhibition Straight from the Heart—The Rant Series.
