= Fedrizzi =

Fedrizzi is an Italian-language surname. Notable people with the surname include:

- Dede Fedrizzi (born 1959), Brazilian film maker, photographer, art director, and artist
- Michele Fedrizzi (born 1991), Italian volleyball player
