= Shigeta =

Shigeta (written: 重田) is a Japanese surname. Notable people with the surname include:

- James Shigeta (1929–2014), American actor
- Harry K. Shigeta (1877–1963), Japanese American photographer
- Yukinori Shigeta (重田 征紀; born 1976), Japanese footballer
- Shigeta Harua (born 2005), Japanese singer
