= Jane Farver =

Jane Farver (1947–2015) was a curator and director in the field of international contemporary art. Farver was a director at the Lehman College Art Gallery, the Tomoko Liguori Gallery, the chief curator of the Queens Museum of Art from 1992–1999, and the head of the MIT List Visual Arts Center from 1999 to 2011. She also was a curator at The Alternative Museum of New York and a director of Spaces in Cleveland, Ohio. She was also a guest co-curator of the 2000 Whitney Biennial and an Artistic Director of the 2011 Incheon Women Artists' Biennale in Incheon, South Korea. She died of a heart attack in 2015. Her partner John L. Moore is also a noted painter and curator.

One of Farver's more well regarded works was the 1999 Queens Museum show Global Conceptualism: Points of Origin 1950s-1980s, which covered conceptualist art.

== Publications ==
- Global Conceptualism: Points of Origin, 1950s-1980s
- Out of India: Contemporary Art of the South Asian Diaspora, December 8, 1997 – March 22, 1998
- Pavel Braila (as an editor)
- Grimanesa Amorós' Light Between the Islands, 2013
