= LaToya Ruby Frazier =

American artist and professor of photography

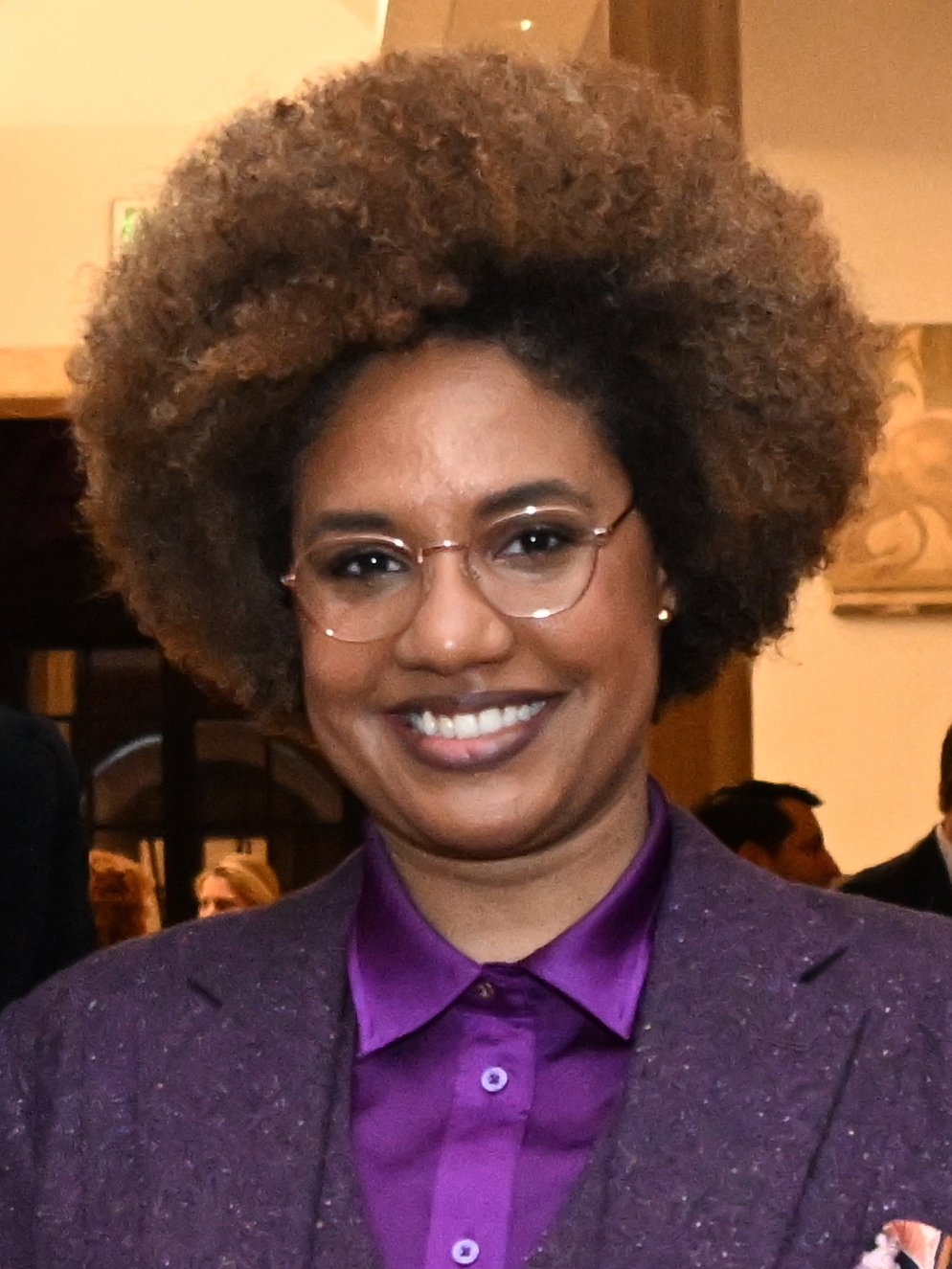
- LaToya Ruby Frazier at the Baltimore Museum of Art in 2024
- Born: 1982 (age 43–44); Braddock, Pennsylvania, US
- Education: Edinboro University of Pennsylvania (BFA, 2004); Syracuse University (MFA, 2007); Whitney Museum Independent Study Program, (2011)
- Known for: Photography, video art, performance art
- Awards: Creative Capital Award (2012); Guna S. Mundheim Fellowship in the Visual Arts (2014); Guggenheim Fellowship (2014); MacArthur Fellowship (2015)
- Website: latoyarubyfrazier.com

LaToya Ruby Frazier (born 1982) is an American artist.

== Early life ==
From Braddock, Pennsylvania, Frazier began photographing her family and hometown at the age of 16, revising the social documentary traditional of Walker Evans and Dorothea Lange to imagine documentation from within and by the community, and collaboration between the photographer and her subjects. Inspired by Gordon Parks, who promoted the camera as a weapon for social justice, Frazier uses her tight focus to make apparent the impact of systemic problems, from racism to deindustrialization to environmental degradation, on individual bodies, relationships and spaces. In her work, she is concerned with bringing to light these problems, which she describes as global issues.

Speaking to The New York Times about her position, Frazier said: "We need longer sustained stories that reflect and tell us where the prejudices and blind spots are and continue to be in this culture and society.... This is a race and class issue that is affecting everyone. It is not a black problem, it is an American problem, it is a global problem. Braddock is everywhere."

== Education ==
Entering college at 17, Frazier studied photography under Kathe Kowalski, who became an important mentor, introducing her to feminist theory, semiotics and the political uses, good and bad, of photography. graduated in 2004 with a Bachelor of Fine Arts degree in Photography and Graphic Design from Edinboro University of Pennsylvania, and in 2007 received a Masters of Fine Art Photography from the School of Visual Performing Arts at Syracuse University. After participating in the 2010–11 Whitney Independent Study Program, she began teaching at Yale University.

Frazier has been extensively educated in photography through education at Edinboro University of Pennsylvania (BFA), Syracuse University (MFA), the Whitney Museum of American Art Independent Study Program, and she was the Guna S. Mundheim Fellow for Visual Arts at the American Academy in Berlin.

== Career ==
External videos
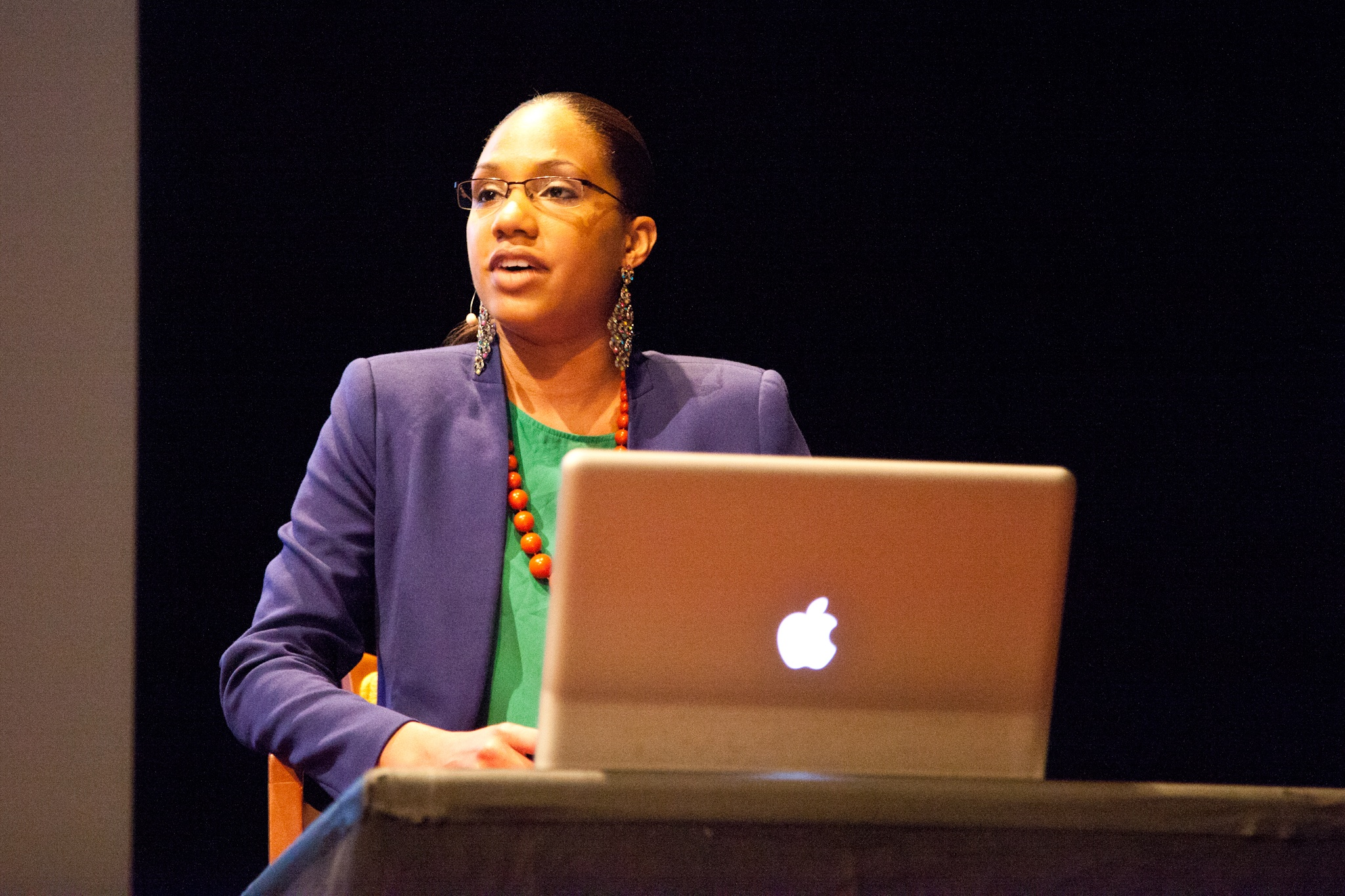
- LaToya Ruby Frazier: A visual history of inequality in industrial America, March 2015, 5:03, TED Talks
- ICP Infinity Awards: On location with LaToya, May 1, 2015, 9:05, MediaStorm
- LaToya Ruby Frazier, 2015 MacArthur Fellow, September 28, 2015, 5:03, MacArthur Foundation

Frazier reports drawing and painting from a young age, and credits her Grandma Ruby's with setting high expectations for her achievements.

Since 2009, she has been included in a range of major group exhibitions, including the New Museum's The Generational Triennial: Younger Than Jesus, MoMA PS1's Greater New York: 2010, the 2011 Incheon Women Artists' Biennale Terra Incognita, and the 2012 Whitney Biennial. Her solo museum exhibition, A Haunted Capital, opened at the Brooklyn Museum in 2013. Additionally, she was part of the 2009-2010 cohort of artists who participated in Lower Manhattan Cultural Council's Workspace residency program.

In 2014, Frazier published her first book, The Notion of Family, which received the International Center for Photography Infinity Award.

== Awards ==
Frazier is the recipient of many awards, including: Art Matters (2010), Louis Comfort Tiffany Foundation Award (2011), the Theo Westenberger Award of the Creative Capital Foundation (2012), and the Gwendolyn Knight & Jacob Lawrence Prize from the Seattle Art Museum (2013).

In 2014, Frazier was named a Guggenheim Fellow in Creative Arts. The following year, she became a TED2015 Fellow and her monograph, The Notion of Family, published by Aperture in 2014, was awarded the 2015 Infinity Award for Best Publication by the International Center of Photography (ICP). In 2015 Frazier was awarded a MacArthur Fellowship, to which she responded that the award was "validation to my work being a testimony and a fight for social justice and cultural change."

In 2018, Frazier was announced as one of Sundance Institute's Art of Nonfiction Fellows. In 2020, Frazier was named the inaugural recipient of the Gordon Parks Foundation/Steidl Book Prize. In 2021, Frazier was awarded an Honorary Fellowship of the Royal Photographic Society.

== Work ==
Shea Brushing Zion's Teeth with Bottled Water in Her Bathroom, Flint, Michigan (2016-2017), from the series Flint is Family, at the National Portrait Gallery in 2022

The photographic work of LaToya Ruby Frazier includes both images of personal spaces, intensely private moments and the story of racial and economic injustice in America. Her work includes raw portraits of friends and family members in intimate moments and examples of social injustice. As Frazier explains, "the collaboration between my family and myself blurs the line between self-portraiture and social documentary" Often her work focuses on the plight of her home town of Braddock, Pennsylvania which became financially depressed after the collapse of the steel industry in the 1970–80s. With black and white photographs, Frazier highlights the beauty of Braddock and how this town has impacted her family's life along with other residents. Her still photographs have a raw sense of strength and vulnerability juxtaposed in an honest and personal way. Besides working on her most famous work Notion of Family, Frazier has worked with other contemporary issues such as the Flint water crisis. This particular project, Flint is Family, depicts and focuses on a young woman and her family living their everyday lives amongst the crucial water conditions within their lower class Flint community. She recently contributed photographs to a New York Times project, "Why America's Black Mothers and Babies are in a Life-or-Death Crisis".

Some of the other less theatrical compositions that LaToya Ruby Frazier published include Grandma Ruby and Me (2006), Mom After Surgery (2009), and Grandma Ruby Wiping Gramps (2003). While these works are less theatrical, they pack the same emotionally moving storytelling.

Informed by documentary practices from the turn of the last century, Frazier explores identities of place, race, and family in work that is a hybrid of self-portraiture and social narrative. Her primary subjects of these portraits are Frazier's Grandma Ruby (1925–2009), her mother (b. 1959), and the artist herself. The crumbling landscape of Braddock, Pennsylvania, a once-thriving steel town, forms the backdrop of her images, which make manifest both the environmental and infrastructural decay caused by postindustrial decline and the lives of those who continue—largely by necessity—to live among it. As Frazier says, "I see myself as an artist and a citizen that's documenting and telling the story and building the archive of working-class families facing all this change that's happening, because it has to be documented." Through her own family she has been able to recount the history of Braddock by way of the generations who experienced it. Her work begins dialogues about class structure, history, and social responsibility.

A 2018 special issue of Atlantic Magazine featured aerial photography and an essay by Frazier documenting the impact of the assassination of Dr. Martin Luther King. Jr. on the landscapes of Memphis, Chicago and Baltimore. Frazier's work was featured in the 2019 New York Times Magazine Money Issue for her photo essay on the people of Lordstown, Ohio, after the General Motors plant shut down.

== Exhibitions ==
Source: Solo exhibitions:

- Brooklyn Museum, A Haunted Capital (2013)
- Seattle Art Museum, Born by a River (2013)
- Institute of Contemporary Art, Boston, Witness (2013)
- Contemporary Arts Museum, Houston, Witness (2013)
- Gavin Brown's Enterprise, New York, NY (2018)
- Kunstmuseum Wolfsburg, Germany (2021)

Group exhibitions:

- The Way of the Shovel, Art as Archaeology, Museum of Contemporary Art, Chicago, IL (2013)
- Empire State, Palazzo delle Esposizioni, Rome, Italy (2013)
- Gertrude's/LOT, Andy Warhol Museum, Pittsburgh, PA (2011)
- Commercial Break, Garage Projects, 54th Venice Biennale, Italy (2011)
- Greater New York, MoMA PS1, New York, NY (2010)
- The Generational Triennial: Younger Than Jesus, New Museum, New York, NY (2009)

Biennials:

- Busan Biennale, South Korea (2014)
- Recycling Memory: Recapturing the Lost City, 11th Nicaraguan Visual Arts Biennial, Managua (2014)
- Mom, am, I barbarian?, 13th Istanbul Biennial (2013)
- Whitney Museum of American Art, New York (2012)
