= Dede Fedrizzi =

Brazilian film maker, photographer, art director and artist

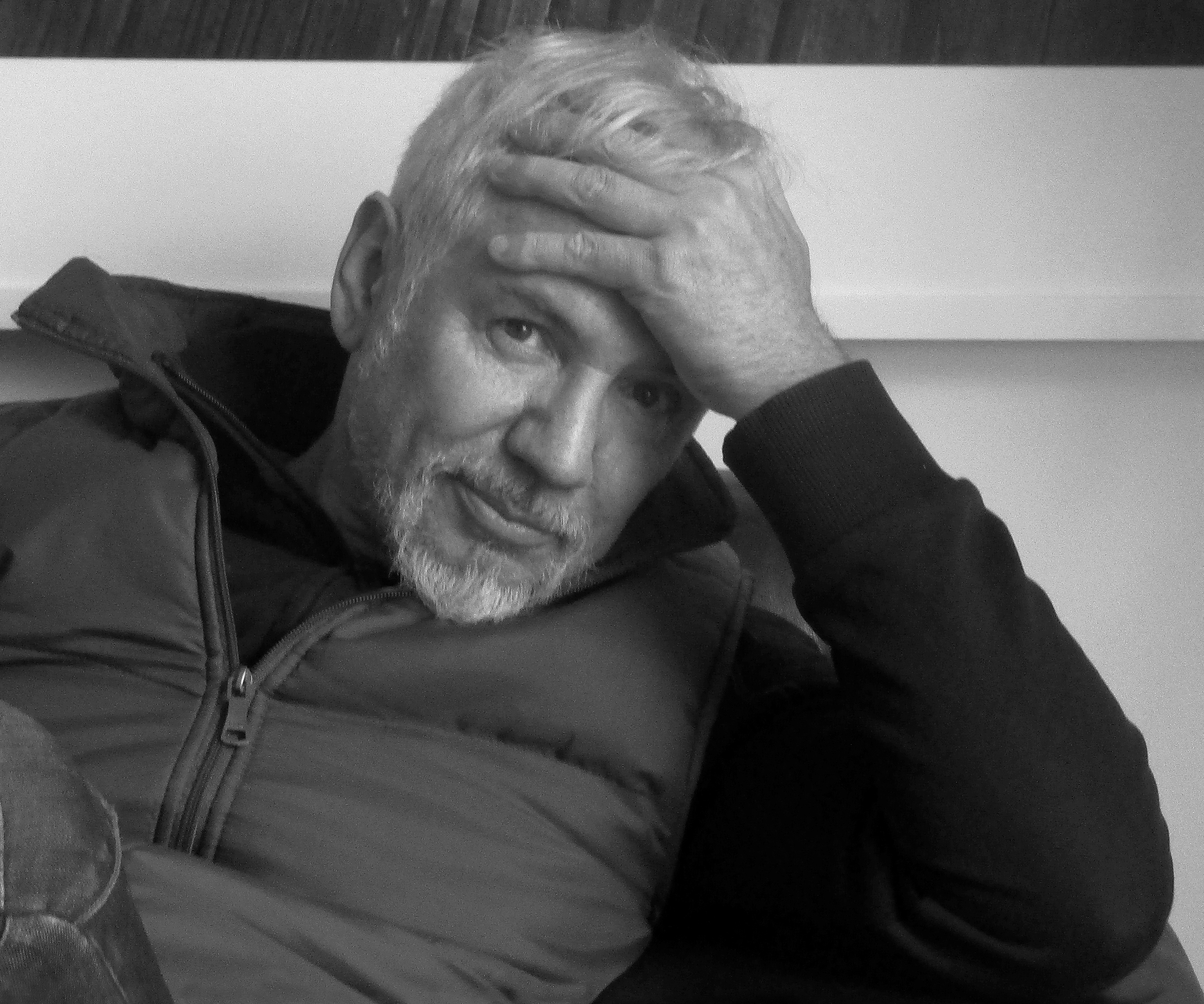
- Fedrizzi in 2018
- Born: Jose Pedro Fedrizzi; 18 December 1959 (age 66); Porto Alegre, Brazil
- Occupations: Film maker, photographer, art director, and artist
- Known for: Documentary films, Black-and-white photography and Meet Joe TV
- Awards: Dactyl Foundation (NY): Best Picture Award 1997, 2013 ROMART Biennial Of Arts in Rome, Italy (gold medal winner)

Dede Fedrizzi is a Brazilian film maker, photographer, art director and artist, who concentrates on portraiture, advertising imagery and documenting the Human condition. He is the creator of the mini-profile TV documentary series entitled, Meet Joe. His films and frequently explicit photographs have been exhibited globally. His printed images are often framed in sculptural forms he has handmade from driftwood or metal.

== Life and career ==
Born in southern Brazil, Fedrizzi began traveling out of his native Porto Alegre at a very early age in pursuit of photography assignments. He has since visited over thirty countries and has lived and worked in São Paulo, Spain, Switzerland, Greece, Germany, and New York. He is currently based in São Paulo, Brazil.

Fedrizzi has photographed several multi-national ad campaigns including Panasonic, MTV and TIM Brasil, his work has also been published in hundreds of magazines including; Vogue Elle, Cosmopolitan, Zingmagazine, UP Magazine (Portugal), Playboy, Trip (Brazil) and Art in America.

His celebrity photography subjects have included Pelé, Neymar, Milla Jovovich, Ithaka Darin Pappas and Leonard Nimoy.

In March of 2026, at the Instituto Ling in Porto Alegre (Brazil), Dede Fedrizzi presented special series of audiovisual encounters dedicated to three central themes of the contemporary human experience: loneliness, healing, and longevity. Each encounter featured a documentary screening followed by a discussion between the artist and guests. Each phase of the series constructed a journey traversing different moments of life, and encourage the audience to rethink relationships, choices, and ways of being in the world.

== Films ==
- 2020 Invisiveis (Invisibles) - written, directed and edited by Dede Fedrizzi (One Man Film)
- 2024 Os Novos Velhos (The New Old) - written, directed and edited by Dede Fedrizzi (One Man Film)
- 2025 Cura (Cure) - written, directed and edited by Dede Fedrizzi (One Man Film)
- 2025 Longevidade (Longevity) - written, directed and edited by Dede Fedrizzi
- 2025 Solidão - written, directed and edited by Dede Fedrizzi (One Man Film)
- 2025 Accessibilize - written, directed and edited by Dede Fedrizzi (One Man Film)

== Exhibitions ==
- 1979 Alfred Gallery (Caxias do Sul, Brazil)
- 1981 Eucatexpo Gallery (Porto Alegre, Brazil)
- 1983 SSC: Sea Study Center (Tramandai, Brazil)
- 1986 Leica Gallery (Zurich)
- 1987 Embassy of Brazil (Madrid)
- 1989 Tenth Biennial of arts (São Paulo)
- 1990 Galeria Atenas (Greece)
- 1990 Léquipe Gallery – "People" (São Paulo)
- 1991 Photo Factory Gallery (Munich)
- 1992 Le Nu (Paris)
- 1993 Gallery Teatro Municipal (Porto Alegre, Brazil)
- 1995 Hugo Boss (São Paulo)
- 1997 Dactyl Foundation Gallery (New York) Best Picture Award
- 1999 Young & Rubicam Gallery (New York)
- 1999 Camel in Focus (São Paulo)
- 2009 Dalmau Studio (São Paulo)
- 2010 Espaço Fabrika (São Paulo)
- 2013 Contempo Gallery (São Paulo)
- 2013 MIXTAPE Design (São Paulo)
- 2013 ROMART: International Biennial of Art and Culture (Rome). Gold Medal Winner
- 2015 Prego Gallery, (São Paulo)
- 2026 Instituto Ling (São Paulo, Brazil)

== Articles and interviews ==
- 2009 Sinos Foto Clube (Brazil)
- 2009 Unit Magazine (Brazil)
- 2011 FMAG (Brazil)
- 2011 Brasil Fashion Network
