= Grimanesa Amorós =

Peruvian-American artist

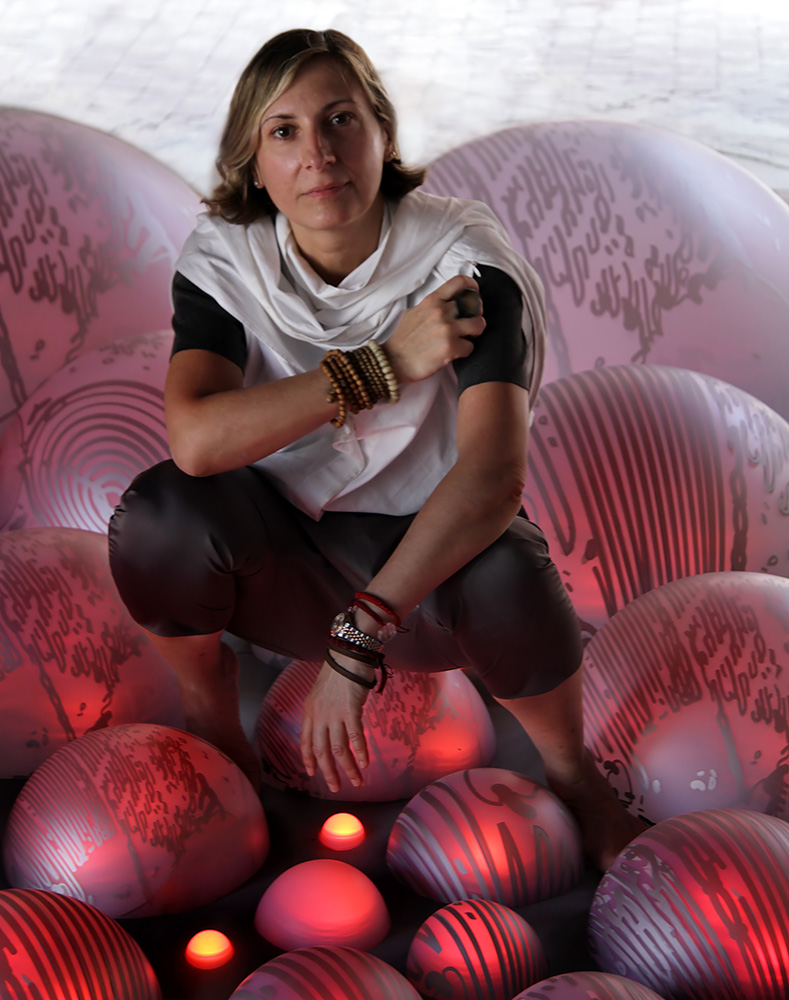
- Grimanesa Amorós Uros Island, Venice Biennale 2011
- Born: Grimanesa Amorós; 1962 (age 63–64); Lima, Peru
- Known for: Light art, Installation art, Sculpture
- Notable work: Radiance (2026); Amplexus (2022); Pink Lotus (2015); Uros House (2011)
- Awards: National Endowment for the Arts Visual Artists Fellowship Grant and the Art in Embassies Program
- Website: www.grimanesaamoros.com

Grimanesa Amorós (/ˈɡrɪmənɛsəəmˈɔːroʊs/ gri-mah-NEH-sah-ah-moh-ROHS; born 1962 in Lima, Peru) is a Peruvian-born American light artist known for large-scale light-based installations. Her work draws on themes of cultural heritage, community, and technology, and often references the landscape and traditions of her native Peru. She began working with light as her medium after a 2001 trip to Iceland, where she saw the aurora borealis.

Amorós's installations have been exhibited internationally at venues including the Ludwig Museum and the Central Academy of Fine Arts in Beijing, China, and her work was included in the Future Pass collateral exhibition at the 54th Venice Biennale in 2011. Notable projects include Uros House at Times Square in New York City, Golden Waters at the Scottsdale Waterfront in Arizona, Passage at The Peninsula Istanbul and Radiance at Walt Disney Concert Hall in Los Angeles.

In addition to her artistic practice, Amorós has presented her work at institutions and events including TEDGlobal in Brazil, Brown University, and Parsons School of Design.

== Early life and career ==
Grimanesa Amorós was born in Lima, Peru, in 1962. Her father was a civil engineer and her mother was creatively inclined; Amorós has said both parents influenced her later artistic practice. As a child she became fascinated with maps, and her mother enrolled her in painting classes at around the age of 11.

Amorós studied psychology at university but left the program before completing her degree to pursue art. She relocated to New York City and studied at The Art Students League of New York from 1984 to 1988. Alongside her light installations, she has worked in painting, video, and sculpture.

Describing her early work, the curator Dan Cameron wrote in a catalogue essay for her 1994 exhibition The World at the Carolyn J. Roy Gallery in New York that her painted figures resembled "jagged patches of energy" more than solid form, and connected her willingness to affirm the "life-transforming potential of art" to her upbringing in Lima and her interest in the art and religion of indigenous peoples.

== Notable installations ==
Amorós's light-based installations frequently address cultural identity, urban landscapes, and the relationship between technology and human experience. Her work typically incorporates LED lights, diffusion materials, and programmed lighting sequences tailored to each site. She has likened programming her lighting sequences to "composing a piece of music," and has said she composes them on site, second by second.

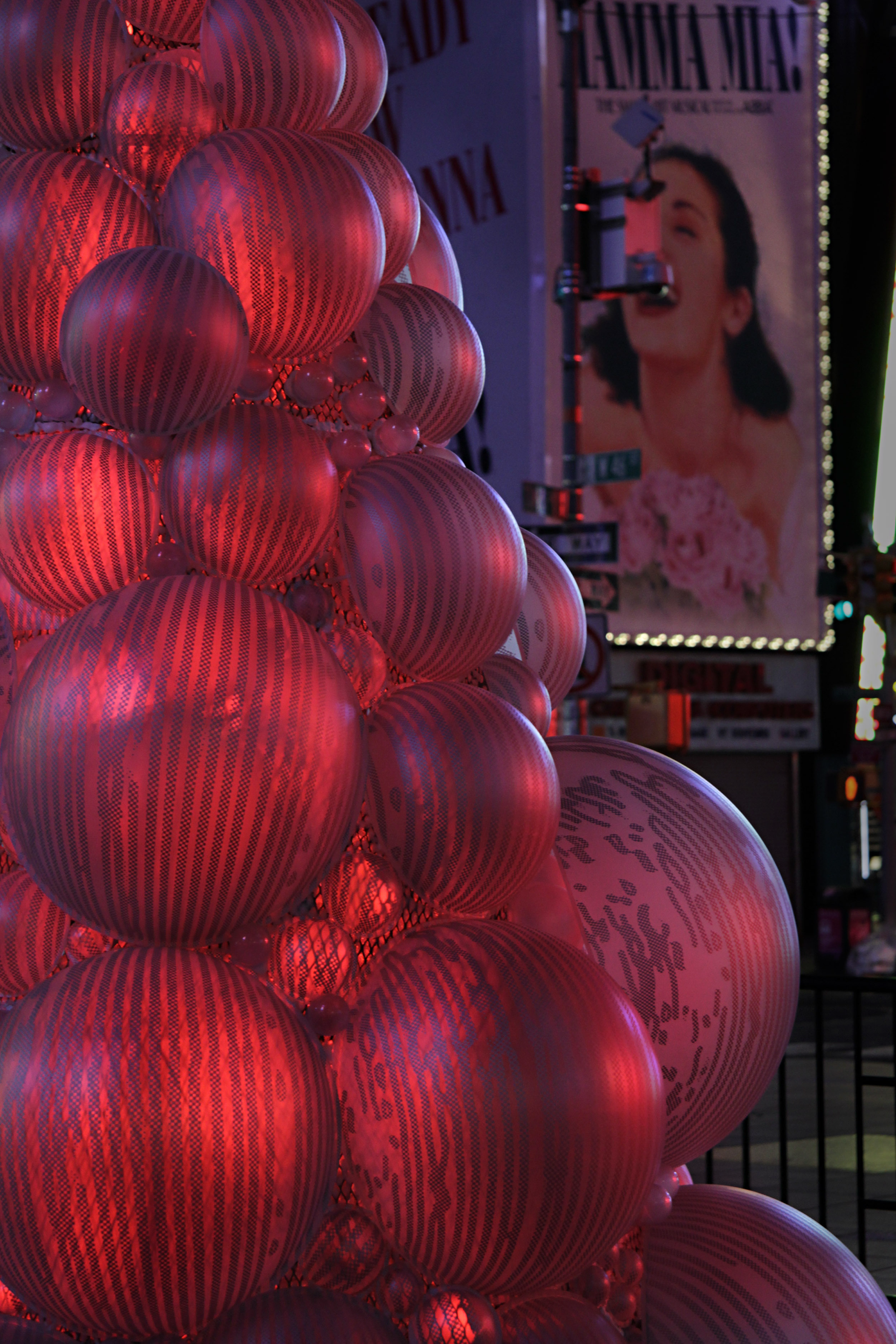
Uros House in Times Square, 2011.

In 2011, Amorós created Uros House as a site-specific installation for the Times Square Alliance's Public Art Program in New York City, presented during Armory Arts Week in conjunction with The Armory Show. Installed at Duffy Square and the Broadway plazas between 46th and 47th Streets, the work appeared alongside pieces by artists including Tom Otterness and Niki de Saint Phalle. The piece used light-diffusing materials and animated lighting inspired by the reed housing structures of the Uros people of Lake Titicaca.

Later in 2011, Amorós installed a related Uros work at the Tribeca Issey Miyake store, designed by Frank Gehry; the critic Alexander Cavaluzzo, writing in Hyperallergic, described it as setting her luminous "bubble" sculptures in tension with the boutique's exoskeletal architecture.

Pink Lotus, unveiled in 2015, was a public art installation commissioned for The Peninsula New York as part of the hotel's "Art of Pink" initiative supporting Breast Cancer Awareness Month. It was inspired by the lotus flower, which symbolizes purity and rebirth in many cultures.

That same year, Golden Waters was installed above the Arizona Canal in Scottsdale, Arizona, sponsored by Scottsdale Public Art. Inspired by the irrigation systems of the Hohokam people, the piece consisted of illuminated tubing suspended above the water and was positioned near architect Paolo Soleri's Soleri Bridge.

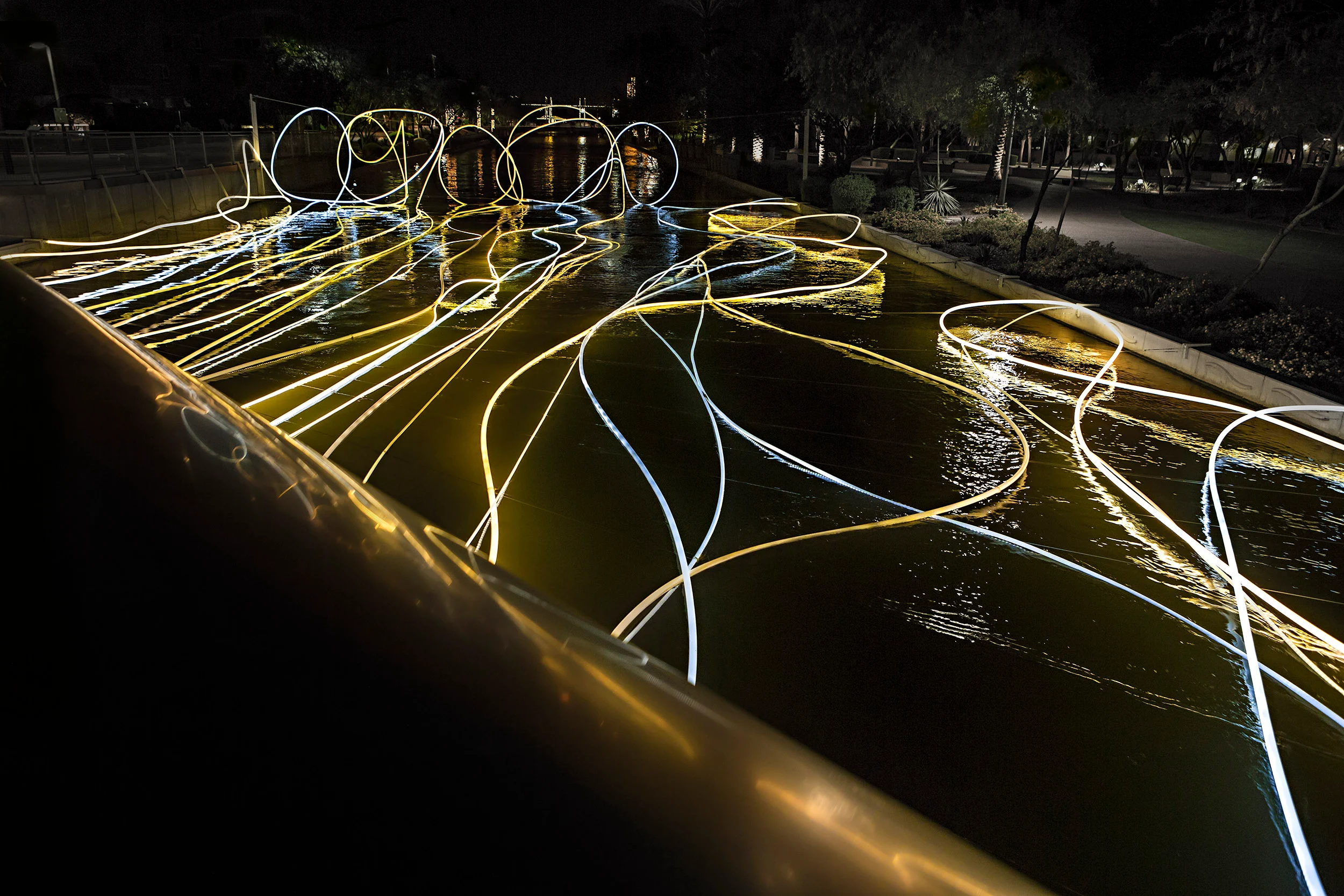
Golden Waters at the Soleri Bridge in Scottsdale, Arizona.

In 2018, Amorós created Hedera, a monumental red light installation at the Prospect Park Bandshell, commissioned by the Brooklyn arts organization BRIC for the 40th-anniversary season of its Celebrate Brooklyn! festival.

In 2019, Amorós created Mariposa Dorada for the 13th Havana Biennial, a monumental light sculpture installed on a building façade along Havana's Malecón as part of the biennial's Detrás del Muro program and inspired by Cuba's national flower.

In 2021, she completed Golden Array, a large-scale installation commissioned by the Reliance Group and Maker Maxity for the Bandra Kurla Complex (Jio World Drive) in Mumbai, India. Measuring roughly 210 by 70 feet, the work was inspired by the tangle of cable lines Amorós observed across the Mumbai skyline and used gold- and white-lit cables in a cascading form.

In 2022, Amorós created Scientia, a monumental site-specific light sculpture suspended in the atrium of the Azkuna Zentroa cultural center in Bilbao, Spain, on view from May to August 2022. The work was commissioned for the arts program of the inaugural Wellbeing Summit for Social Change, curated by Manuel Bagorro with Vicente Todolí as artistic advisor, which commissioned international artists including Mirosław Bałka, Janet Cardiff and Carlos Garaicoa.

In 2022, Amorós presented Amplexus at Noor Riyadh, a citywide light and art festival in Riyadh, Saudi Arabia. The work's title, derived from the Latin for "embrace," incorporated reflective materials and responsive lighting patterns inspired by themes of connection and urban identity.

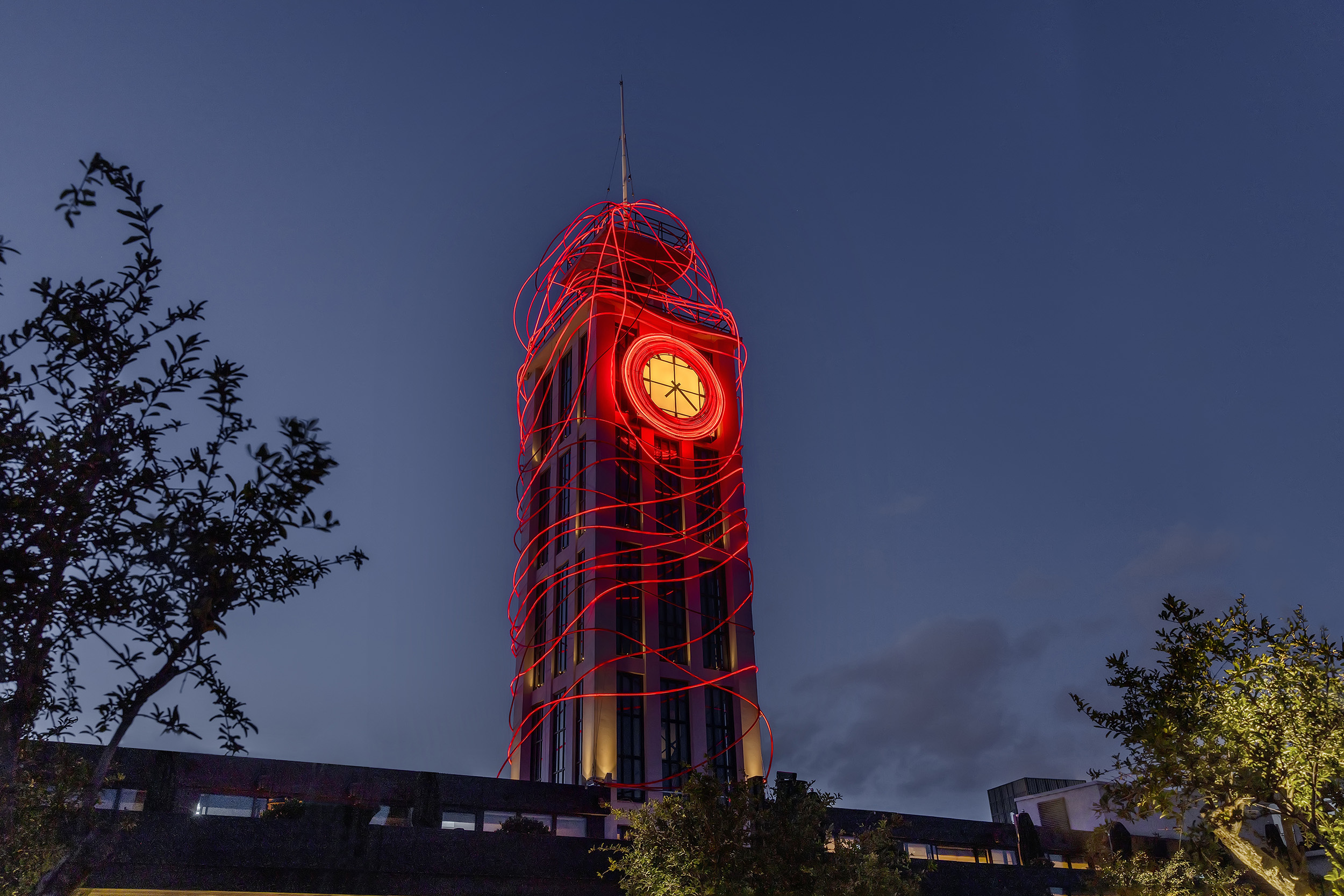
Passage on display at the Peninsula Istanbul clocktower.

In September 2025, Amorós created two light installations for The Peninsula Istanbul. Maritime, located in the hotel lobby, is inspired by the Bosphorus and the city's maritime history. The second, Passage, is located on the hotel's clock tower and is inspired by the Çinili Han, a passenger hall where travelers awaited transit. Writing in Galerie, Jill Sieracki described the clock tower as glowing from within "a tight tangle of cherry-red light". Both installations were commissioned as part of The Peninsula's "Art in Resonance" program and presented in conjunction with the Contemporary Istanbul art fair.

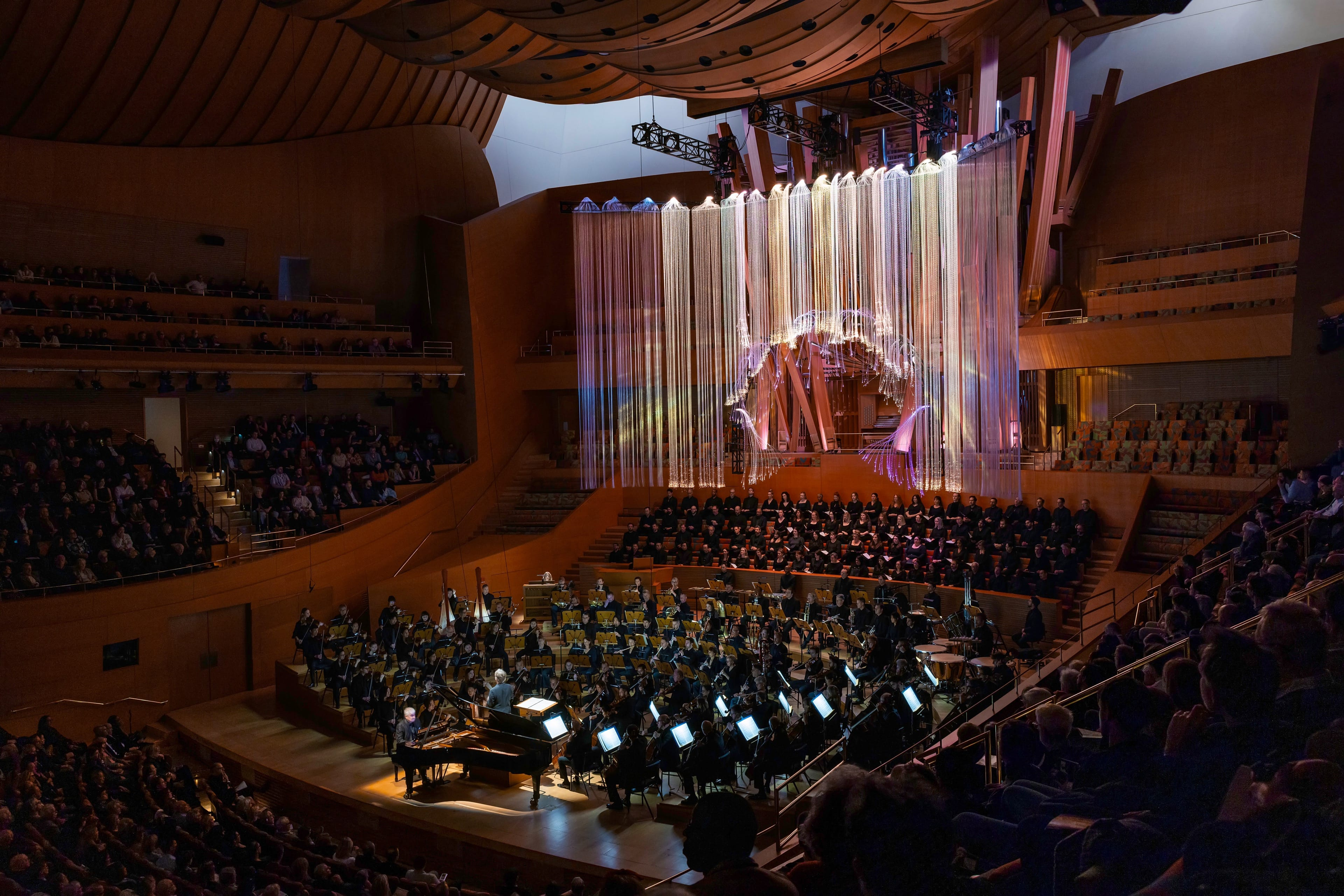
Light installation RADIANCE in the Walt Disney Concert Hall, by Grimanesa Amoros.

In January 2026, Amorós created a site-specific light installation, Radiance, for the Los Angeles Philharmonic at Walt Disney Concert Hall, presented in conjunction with performances of Alexander Scriabin's Prometheus: Poem of Fire, conducted by Esa-Pekka Salonen and featuring pianist Jean-Yves Thibaudet. Reviewing the premiere in The New York Times, Joshua Barone described the installation as hanging in front of the hall's organ, with tendrils around the console's opening that "draped and curled like plants at the mouth of a cave." Later that month, Amorós partnered with the French department store Printemps to produce Perfect Timing, a large-scale installation for the storefront and interior spaces of its New York City flagship at One Wall Street.

== Exhibitions ==
In 2011, Amorós's Uros Island was shown in the Future Pass collateral exhibition at the 54th Venice Biennale, a survey of Asian and international artists curated by Victoria Lu, Renzo di Renzo and Felix Schöber.

In February 2013, Amorós presented Light Between the Islands at the Litvak Gallery, on view through May 2013. A continuation of her Uros series, the installation filled the gallery with illuminated polycarbonate domes of varying sizes, silkscreened with imagery of totora reeds, whose appearance shifted as daylight through the gallery's window changed; the exhibition was accompanied by a catalogue with an essay by curator Jane Farver and a video work, Miranda, scored by Ivri Lider.

In June 2013, Amorós created The Mirror Connection, a site-specific installation for the main lobby of the CAFA Art Museum in Beijing, designed by Arata Isozaki. Later that year she presented Fortuna, a light installation commissioned by Spain's Ministry of Culture for the La Fragua hall of the Tabacalera in Madrid, a former royal tobacco factory, the work taking its name from a cigarette brand once produced there.

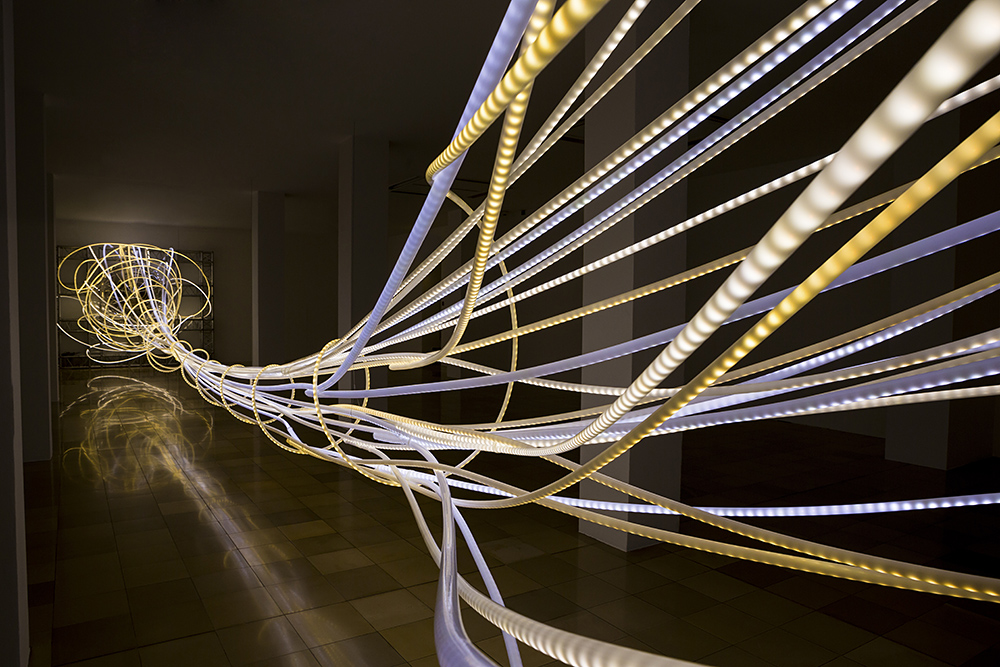
Grimanesa Amorós, Ocupante, Ludwig Museum, 2016.

In 2016, Amorós presented Ocupante, a solo exhibition at the Ludwig Museum, comprising the large-scale light installations Ocupante and Golden Secret Room together with video work. The exhibition was accompanied by a monograph, Grimanesa Amorós: Ocupante, edited by the museum's director Beate Reifenscheid and published by Hirmer, with a contribution by Andreas Backoefer and a conversation between Amorós and curator Tim Goossens. In her catalogue essay, Reifenscheid characterized light in Amorós's practice as "space, movement, time," likening the movement of the installation's LED tubes across the room to breathing. The same year, her work was included in OnSite Katonah, a group exhibition of site-specific installations at the Katonah Museum of Art in New York, for which she filled the museum's Sally and Volney Righter Gallery with a darkened installation of plastic, bubble-like forms resembling glowing islands.

== Critical reception ==
Commentators have frequently connected Amorós's light installations to Peruvian cultural memory and to the perceptual and communal effects of light.

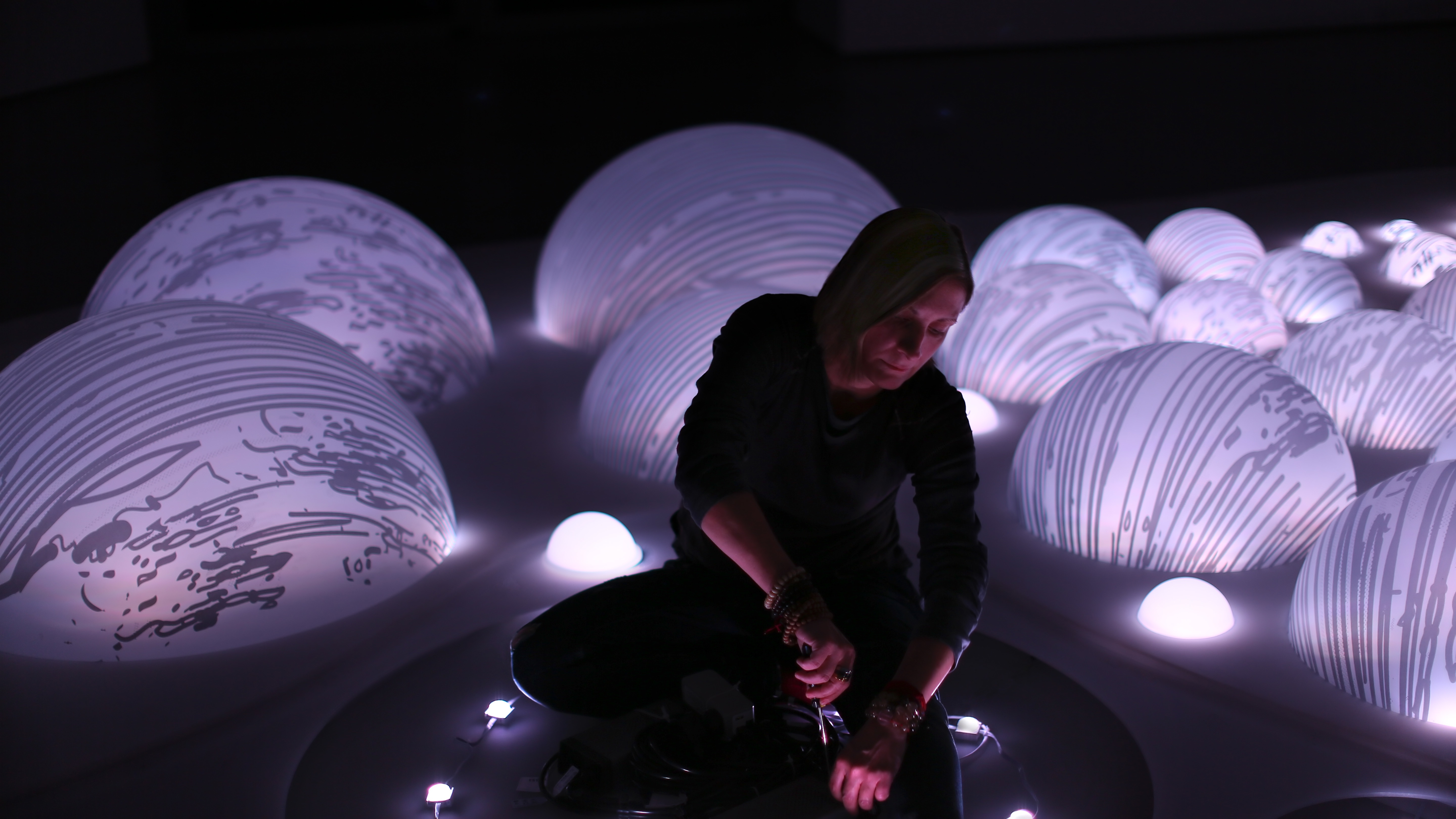
Grimanesa Amorós, Light Between the Islands, 2013

In her essay for the Light Between the Islands exhibition catalogue, the curator Jane Farver, a former director of the MIT List Visual Arts Center, read Amorós's LED works through Peruvian sources, linking them to the sea foam of the Pacific coast and the floating Uros islands of Lake Titicaca. In a conversation published in the same catalogue, the critic Lilly Wei remarked that the work offered viewers "many points of entry."

In essays for the exhibition catalogue Between Heaven and Earth (Hostos Center for the Arts, CUNY, 2006), the art critic Marek Bartelik and the art historian Susan Aberth discussed the installation of the same name, in essays titled "A Journey Between Heaven and Earth" and "A Moment of Sanctuary," respectively.

Reviewing the Ocupante exhibition at the Ludwig Museum, the museum's director Beate Reifenscheid characterized light in Amorós's practice as "space, movement, time."

Amorós's work has also been discussed in academic literature. Judith K. Brodsky discussed Amorós among feminist artists working in public art, describing Hedera (2018) as covering the Prospect Park band shell in loops of lighted tubing emulating climbing vines, and linking Golden Waters (2015) to both the irrigation canals of the Hohokam and Paolo Soleri's Arcosanti. The architecture theorist Antonino Saggio argued that Golden Waters made Soleri's pedestrian bridge and the canal beneath it into gathering elements, and that installations of this kind counter urban neglect by encouraging public participation.

Amorós's work has also drawn independent press coverage. Writing in Hyperallergic, the critic Alexander Cavaluzzo described her Uros installation at the Tribeca Issey Miyake store as setting her luminous "bubble" sculptures in tension with the boutique's architecture. Reviewing Radiance at Walt Disney Concert Hall in The New York Times, Joshua Barone described the installation's tendrils around the organ console as having "draped and curled like plants at the mouth of a cave." Writing in Flaunt, Melanie Perez described a practice "rooted in architectural sensitivity and cultural memory" that treats light as "a living force."

== Collaborations ==
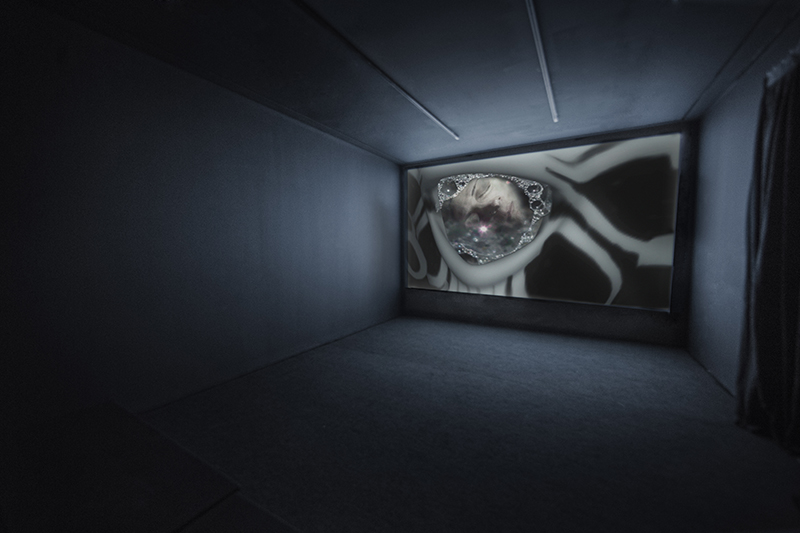
Grimanesa Amorós, Miranda video, 2013

In 2006, Amorós collaborated with Grammy-winning José Luis Pardo of Los Amigos Invisibles on the score for Reflexión Obscura. In her video Rootless Algas, she worked with composer Hilmar Örn Hilmarsson, who wrote an original score.

In 2013, Amorós collaborated with Ivri Lider of The Young Professionals on the soundtrack for her video Miranda, shown as part of her Light Between the Islands exhibition. She created the lighting sculpture Timeless Motion (In Life and Light) for a jewelry presentation at the Biennale des Antiquaires at the Grand Palais in Paris, France.

In 2022, Amorós collaborated with actor and musician Maya Hawke on a cover story for As If Magazine (Issue 21), photographed by editor-in-chief Tatijana Shoan, creating a light-based installation as the backdrop for the shoot.

== Awards and grants ==
- Choose Creativity Awards (2023)
- New York City Public Design Commission 41st Annual Awards for Excellence in Design (2023)
- Culture Summit Artists-in Residence Award (2018)
- Bronx Museum of the Arts: AIM Alumni Artist Award (2017)
- ARTspace Summer Artist-in-Residence (2004)
- Virginia Center for the Creative Arts Fellowship Residency (2002)
- ART/OMI Fellowship Residency (1993)
- Bronx Museum of the Arts: AIM Program (1990)
