= Incheon Women Artists' Biennale =

The Incheon Women Artists' Biennale, held in Incheon, South Korea, and inaugurated in 2004, subsequently had editions in 2007, 2009, and 2011 that focused on the work of contemporary women artists. It is the first and only art biennale in the world focused on the work of female artists.

== Founding and challenges ==
The Biennial was first conceived by local women artists in Incheon; many were fine art teachers in public and private schools. They had aspired to have large exhibitions that would connect with the rest of the world since 1996. They had to fight, however, against the prejudices against women artists' gatherings. Local male artists mounted an anti-biennale in 2006.

== 2009 edition ==
The 2009 edition featured works by American feminist artists Faith Ringgold and Judy Chicago as well as 99 other artists from 25 other countries. Organized by Dr. Eunhee Yang, along with curators Dr. Thalia Vrachopoulos and Sutthirat Supaparinya, the main exhibition "So Close Yet So Far Away" brought together artists from diverse countries whose works question and go beyond the cultural boundaries of given identities.

Heng-Gil Han was the operating committee chairman and curator of the Tuning Exhibition of 2009 entitled "The 21st Century, the Feminine Century, and the Century of Diversity and Hope," and the work exhibited encompassing a larger variety of media like multimedia, performances, film, writing, discussion, and animation, and included male-identifying artists. It included artwork by Eun Mi Choi, Disband, Coco Fusco, Donna Huanca, Akiko Ichikawa, Chang-jin Lee, Hyuk Kang, Bo Sub Kim, Se Won Kim, Lee Mingwei, Xaviera Simmons, Carolee Schneemann, and Lorna Simpson.

The Participation Exhibition showed the work exclusively of Korean artists, and, like the main exhibition, the work only of women. Kyung-ae Kwon was the president of the biennale organizing committee, and Eunhee Yang the commissioner of the main exhibition.

== 2011 edition ==
The main exhibition for the 2011 edition, entitled "Terra Incognita," was curated by Jane Farver, former director of MIT's List Visual Arts Center. It included the art of Joan Jonas, LaToya Ruby Frazier, and Yael Bartana, and 25 other women from a total 13 countries. The Tuning Exhibition that year was co-curated by Han, Gyoung Mo Rhee, Kyoeng Sub Yue, and two others, and the work shown focussed on social practice art by artists regardless of gender. The Participation exhibition included the work of female artists active in women's artists organizations around the world and those who specifically contributed to the advancement of the Incheon Women Artists' Biennale.

== 2013 edition ==
The organizing committee lost its momentum in 2013 as the political environment was unfriendly enough to secure government funding. That year's version was held at a smaller scale with Korean artists, which became its last.
