= Chang-Jin Lee =

Korean-American visual artist

Chang-Jin Lee (Korean: 이창진) is a Korean-American visual artist who lives in New York City.

Lee was born in Seoul, South Korea, and lives in New York City.

== Education ==
Lee attended Parsons School of Design and earned her BFA from the State University of New York at Purchase.

== Career ==
In 2011, Lee received a fellowship from the Franconia Sculpture Park, for which she created Dear Leader, an inflatable monument of Kim Jung Il. Lee's sculptural art Floating Echo, a transparent inflatable Buddha atop a lotus flower, debuted at the Busan Sea Art Festival in Korea in 2011. The 10-foot-high work was presented at the Socrates Sculpture Park in Queens in 2012, where it floated in the East River, and at the Three River Arts Festival at Point State Park in Pittsburgh the following year.

Lee began researching comfort women in 2007. She traveled to seven Asian countries and interviewed survivors of sexual slavery during World War II as well as a former Imperial Japanese Army soldier. She created a film documentary of the subjects recalling their experiences during the war and their aspirations. Her exhibition Comfort Women Wanted opened at South Korea's Incheon Women Artists' Biennale in 2009. The exhibition's title echoes newspaper advertisements soliciting comfort women during World War II. The exhibition recreates a comfort station. It was later exhibited in Bonn, Boston, Hong Kong, Pittsburgh, and Taipei. Public art billboards from the exhibition were selected for the New York City Department of Transportation's Urban Art Program in 2013.

== Awards ==
Lee has received numerous awards, including a New York State Council on the Arts grant, Asian Cultural Council fellowship, an Asian Women Giving Circle award, a New York Foundation for the Arts Fiscal Sponsorship award, a Puffin Foundation grant, a Busan Sea Art Festival Award, and a Lower Manhattan Cultural Council's Manhattan Community Arts Fund.
