= Harry K. Shigeta =

Japanese-American photographer

Harry K. Shigeta (1877–1963) was a Japanese–American photographer. He was active in the Little Tokyo, Los Angeles art scene in the 1920s. He moved to Chicago in 1924.

In Los Angeles, he was a teacher of Tōyō Miyatake.

== Bibliography ==
- Chang, Gordon; Johnson, Mark; Karlstrom, Paul; et al., eds. (2008). Asian American Art, A History, 1850–1970. Stanford, California: Stanford University Press.
