= Tōyō Miyatake =

American photographer (1895–1979)

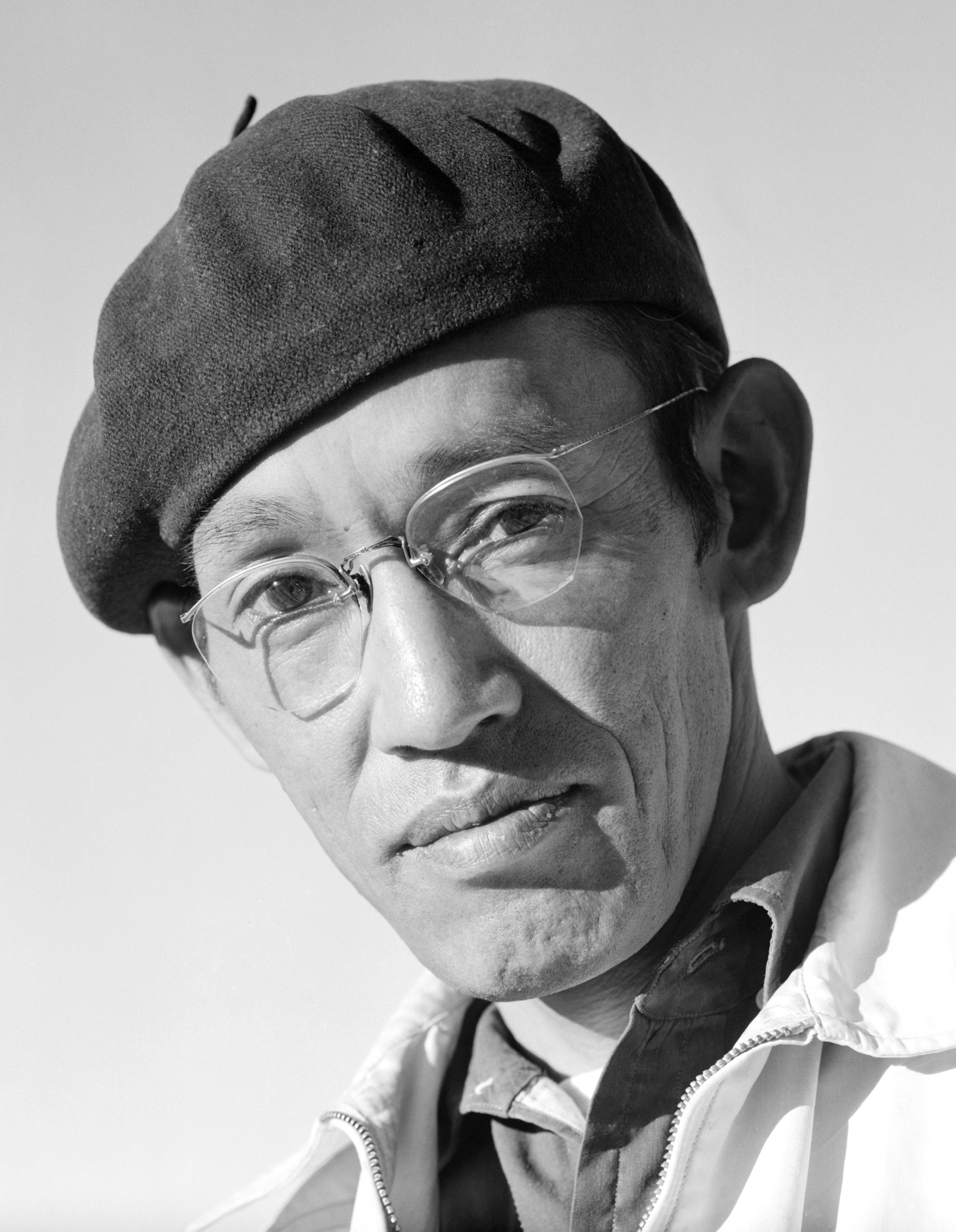
- portrait of Tōyō Miyatake by Ansel Adams, 1943
- Born: 1895; Kagawa, Shikoku, Japan
- Died: 1979 (aged 84); Los Angeles County, California, United States
- Occupation: Photographer

Tōyō Miyatake (宮武東洋, Miyatake Tōyō; 1895–1979) was a Japanese American photographer, best known for his photographs documenting the Japanese American people and the Japanese American internment at Manzanar during World War II.

== Life ==
Miyatake was born in Kagawa, Shikoku, in Japan in 1895. In 1909 he migrated to the United States to join his father. He settled in the Little Tokyo section of Los Angeles, California.

With an interest in arts — most notably photography, which he studied under Harry K. Shigeta — Miyatake began associating with the local arts community. In 1923 he bought his photo studio. Miyatake encouraged fellow photographer Edward Weston to exhibit his work and Miyatake is credited as giving Weston his first gallery showing.

At the time Miyatake met his future wife, his brother was courting her. He began spending time with Hiro under the guise that he was using her as a model. His brother was crushed; it is said that he "died of a broken heart" at an early age.

Before World War II, Miyatake's photography won awards including the 1926 London International Photography Exhibition as he photographed various personalities.

=== Manzanar ===
With the outbreak of American involvement in World War II following the attack on Pearl Harbor, Miyatake was incarcerated at the Manzanar internment camp in the Owens Valley, along with his wife and four children, part of the internment of Japanese Americans during the war. He smuggled a camera lens into the camp and had a camera body constructed from wood, while an ally smuggled film and developing supplies to him from outside to allow him to take and develop photographs of the camp. Using this equipment he secretly took photographs of the camp, working primarily in the early morning before most people were about, or at mealtimes, to avoid being seen photographing by the military police. Although he initially started his photography in secret, he approached Manzanar project director Ralph Merritt to ask to serve as official camp photographer. This would allow him to take photos to commemorate weddings and other official purposes, and to photograph Japanese volunteers who wanted photos for their families before they left for military service. Merritt agreed to this, but since at the time inmates were not allowed cameras, the proviso was made that Miyatake could set up the camera and frame the photograph, but the actual shutter release must be done by a white person. This condition was eventually lifted, and eight months after arriving at the camp, Miyatake was issued an ID card as the official concentration camp photographer, allowing him to take pictures at will, and sent for his photographic equipment from his (closed) studio in Los Angeles. He set up a studio at the camp as part of the internee-run Manzanar Consumer Cooperative.

At Manzanar, Miyatake met and began a longtime collaboration with Ansel Adams, who visited and photographed the camp in 1943. After the war, they showed their photographs in a collaborative exhibit, and published the book Two Views of Manzanar featuring both his and Adams' photos of the camp.

Of the three major photographers who documented the camps, Adams, Miyatake, and Dorothea Lange, each one's work showed somewhat different aspects of the camps. Miyatake's work is described as showing "an intimacy with camp life absent in the pictures that Adams and Lange took."

=== Post-War ===
After the war, the family returned to Los Angeles, where their home had been entrusted to some of their white friends during the incarceration. Unlike many families who lost their homes, the Miyatakes were able to resume their life and provide shelter to a few less fortunate incarcerees and their families. In post-war Little Tokyo, many residents were unable to afford Miyatake's services and some opted instead to barter goods to have him photograph weddings and portraits. With his wife Hiro running the front office, she once negotiated his services for a Steinway piano and another time, she negotiated for a litter of poodles.

After the death of his wife, Hiro, in 1971, Miyatake moved from his home on Third Street in East Los Angeles to live in neighboring Monterey Park with his daughter and her family.

He remained active in the studio throughout this period. In the early morning, Miyatake could be seen walking around Monterey Highlands Elementary School for exercise. The last image he captured on film was taken at this park. The film was discovered and processed after his death.

Before his death in 1979, Miyatake and Ansel Adams produced a book, Two Views of Manzanar, a compilation of their photographs during the incarceration.

Miyatake's cremated remains are buried at Evergreen Cemetery in Boyle Heights; a portion of his remains are stored in the Koyasan Buddhist Temple in Little Tokyo.

== Personal life ==
One of Miyatake's prized possessions was his white 1957 Ford Thunderbird, which now belongs to his youngest grandson, Mark Takahashi.

Miyatake was easily recognizable in Little Tokyo, wearing his trademark black beret and bowtie.

=== Children and grandchildren ===
All of Miyatake's children were involved in photography and the family business. Archie, the eldest son, ran the family studio after Tōyō's death in 1979. Robert Miyatake worked in the studio and later opened his own photographic color lab in South Pasadena, California. Richard (Tabo) worked in the family studio as well and left to work in photographic production. Youngest child and only daughter, Minnie, also worked in the studio performing clerical and business-related duties and currently serves on the Board of Trustees at Koyasan Buddhist Temple, where her father's remains are stored. Miyatake's grandson continues the family business to this day.

=== Toyo Miyatake Studio ===
The Toyo Miyatake Studio moved in 1985 to San Gabriel, California, where it still operates today. The studio is now managed by grandson, Alan Miyatake.

== In culture ==
In the TV movie Farewell to Manzanar, Pat Morita portrays Zenahiro, a character based on Miyatake.

== Legacy ==
In 2001, Robert A. Nakamura directed the film, Toyo Miyatake: Infinite Shades of Gray, documenting the photographer's life and work. Kevin Thomas characterized this film in the Los Angeles Times as the "eloquent, deeply moving Toyo Miyatake: Infinite Shades of Gray".

In 2009, the film Toyo's Camera was released, documenting the internment of Japanese Americans during World War II through the perspective of the photographer's images. Narrated by George Takei, music by Kitaro.

His 1929 photograph of Michio Ito appeared on the cover of the Whitney Museum's Spring 2016 gallery guide.

== Books by Miyatake ==
- Adams, Ansel; Miyatake, Toyo (1978). Two Views of Manzanar. Los Angeles: Frederick S. Wight Art Gallery, UCLA. OCLC 4429585.
- (in Japanese) Shashinka Miyatake Tōyō no sekai: Renzu ga toraeta ningen no kiroku: 50-nen no nichibei-kōryū-shi (写真家宮武東洋の世界：レンズがとらえた人間の記録：50年の日米交流史). Tokyo: Bungeishunjū, 1980.
- (in Japanese) Miyatake Tōyō no shashin: 1923–1979 (宮武東洋の写真：1923～1979). Tokyo: Bungeishunjū, 1984.
