= Nina F. Ichikawa =

American writer and agricultural activist

Nina F. Ichikawa (formerly Nina Kahori Fallenbaum) is an American writer, agricultural activist, and the executive director of the Berkeley Food Institute.

== Early life and education ==
Born Nina Kahori Fallenbaum, she grew up in Berkeley, California. She attended Berkeley High School, served as a co-coordinator of the Asian Pacific Student Union, and helped to establish the first high school Asian American Studies program in the United States.

Ichikawa graduated with a BA from U.C. Berkeley and an MA from Tokyo's Meiji Gakuin University. She lived in Japan for ten years. After several years on the east coast, she returned to the San Francisco Bay Area with her husband in 2015.

== Career ==
Ichikawa is the former food and agriculture editor for Hyphen magazine, a publication covering Asian-American arts and politics. Her writing has also been published in Nichi Bei Times, Nikkei Heritage, Civil Eats, Discover Nikkei, Rafu Shimpo, and Al Jazeera America. She also contributed an essay to the 2013 book Eating Asian America: A Food Studies Reader. Ichikawa was also a 2011-13 Institute for Agriculture and Trade Policy Food and Community Fellow, and during her fellowship, she helped found AAPI Food Action, a food policy lobbying organization.

Ichikawa previously worked on the Obama administration's "Know Your Farmer, Know Your Food" initiative at the U.S. Department of Agriculture. In January 2021, she was featured in an in-depth profile by the Cal Alumni Association of U.C. Berkeley.

As the executive director of the Berkeley Food Institute, Ichikawa has spoken with a variety of news outlets about a range of topics related to sustainable food, including the importance of urban farming "for elders, for low-income families, for immigrants," and the history of backyard and rooftop gardening in Asian American communities. She also discussed the impact of the COVID-19 pandemic as "an opportunity for meat-eaters to join together with sustainable producers of meat, and with meat and dairy industry workers, to all unite together and say we want a better system." She has also been featured in an article written and sponsored by the nonprofit organization CUESA, and quoted for her expertise by KQED and Prevention magazine. In 2017, after the California Values Act was passed to provide new safeguards for undocumented immigrants, Shakirah Simley of the San Francisco Chronicle asked "chefs, farmers and advocates" about the meaning of the word "sanctuary," including Ichikawa, who said:

"There is no food without sanctuary. How can you purport to provide food to someone with an equal serving of fear, duress, humiliation or exclusion? For food and agriculture spaces to go another way, we need to reject the politics of discrimination and division at every level — in hiring, ordering, selling, distributing, land purchasing."

In 2021, after the Berkeley Food Institute collaborated with the nonprofit advocacy group Restaurant Opportunities Centers United on a study on racial and gender bias in the restaurant industry, Ichikawa spoke with The New York Times about how "there are biases that lock people into certain positions."

Ichikawa is currently a member of the California Farmer Justice Collaborative.

== Personal life ==
Ichikawa’s great-grandfather emigrated from Japan to the U.S. in 1895 and purchased land before the California Alien Land Law of 1913. For three years, he and his family lived in a concentration camp during World War II, but continued to pay property taxes on the land.

A photograph of Ichikawa's family, including her grandmother, on a trip to Yosemite National Park in the 1930s is featured in an NBC News article about Asian Americans and the travel industry.

In 2019, the San Francisco Chronicle profiled the efforts of Ichikawa and her husband to house her mother, Betty Kano, an artist and educator, in a "tiny home" on their shared property.
