= Andrea Blum =

American artist

- Born: 1950 (age 75–76); New York City
- Citizenship: American
- Occupation: Artist
- Website: andreablum.com

Andrea Blum (born 1950) is an American artist known primarily for her public artworks.

Blum was born in New York City. She received a BFA degree from Tufts University in 1973 and an MFA degree from the Art Institute of Chicago in 1976. Her work is included in the collection of the Smithsonian American Art Museum, the Art Institute of Chicago and the Walker Art Center.

She has been the recipient of a Guggenheim Fellowship, Graham Foundation Fellowship, SJ Weiler Fund Award, Art Matters, NYSCA and National Endowment for the Arts Grants, and in 2005 was named Chevalier, Order of Arts and Letters, by the French Minister of Culture.

Blum is a full professor in combined media in the Department of Art & Art History at Hunter College.
