= Zingmagazine =

Contemporary art magazine

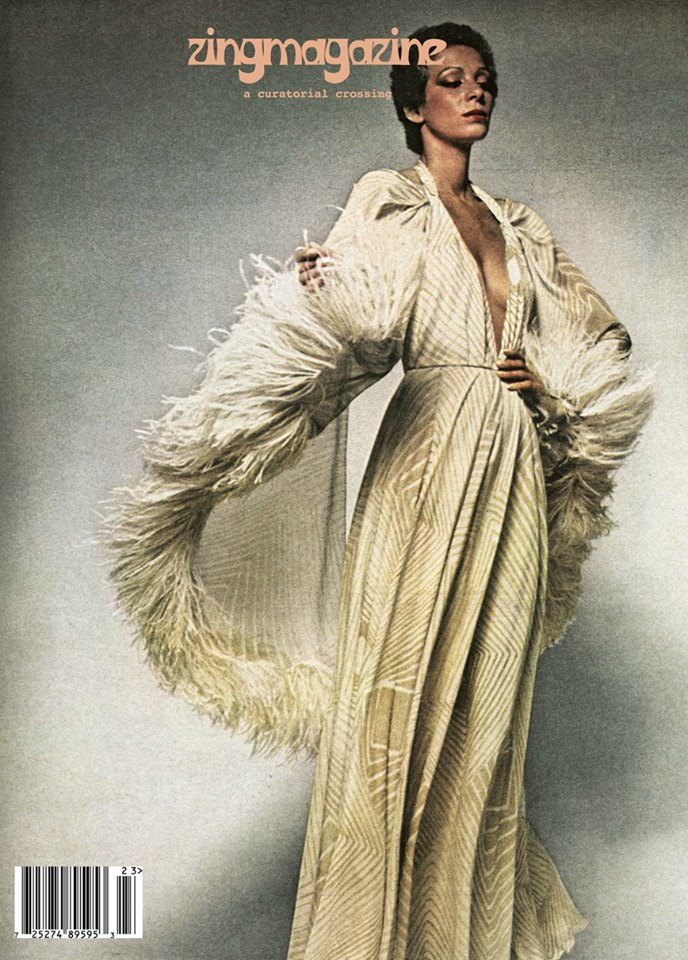
- Editor: Devon Dikeou
- Categories: Art, alternative
- Frequency: Quarterly
- Publisher: Zing, LLC
- Founded: 1995
- Country: United States
- Language: English
- Website: Official site
- ISSN: 1094-5563

zingmagazine is a contemporary art magazine composed of curatorial projects founded in 1995 by artist/editor/publisher Devon Dikeou. zing began as a quarterly, black-and-white magazine. Letters from well-known figures such as Igor Stravinsky, Isaac Asimov, and Ava Gardner were featured on the front covers of early issues, and later on the back covers.

zing is now printed in color and has reached about 400 pages. Its curated projects have featured a variety of artistic mediums, including illustration, architecture, fashion, graphic design, music, painting, drawing, fiction, poetry, and critical reviews.

Based in Manhattan's SoHo, the company also publishes books, CDs, posters, and other special projects. zingmagazine is affiliated with the Dikeou Collection in Denver, a non-profit contemporary art collection started by Devon Dikeou.
