= Walter S. Feldman =

American painter and printmaker

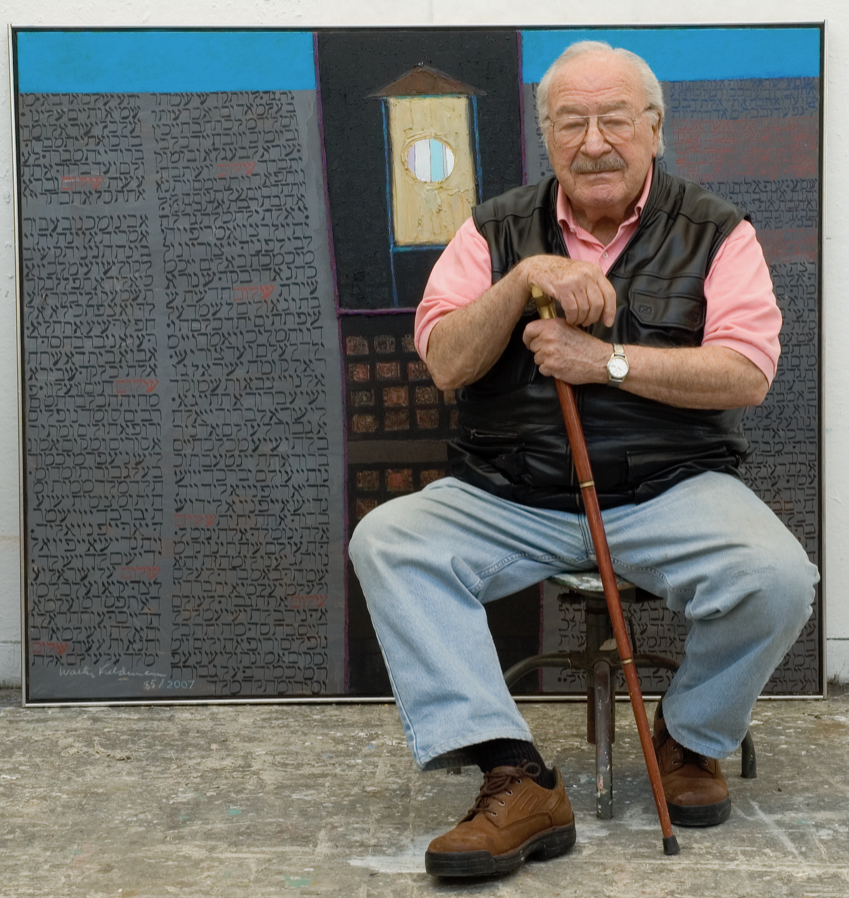
- Artist Walter Feldman in his studio at Brown University, 2006
- Born: 1925; Lynn, Massachusetts
- Died: May 20, 2017 (aged 91–92); Providence, Rhode Island

Walter S. Feldman (1925 – 2017) was a modernist American painter, printmaker, and mosaicist who spent most of his life and career in Providence, Rhode Island. He is best known for his expressionist paintings, woodcuts, and public commission mosaics and stained glass windows. He became a student at the Yale School of Art in 1942. After graduating from the Yale University of Fine Arts (BFA 1950) and Yale University School of Design (MFA 1951), he became an art educator at Brown University for over 5 decades. In 1990, Feldman founded and was the principal designer of art books of Ziggurat Press in Providence.

== Early life ==
Walter Feldman was born in 1925 in Lynn, Massachusetts. His parents were immigrants from Eastern Europe, and Feldman grew up in Chelsea, “a Russian-Polish-Jewish community surrounded by Irish.” While Feldman’s parents hoped he would enter one of the practical professions like law, they appeased his interest in art as a youngster by allowing him to take art classes on Saturday afternoons at the Boston Museum of Fine Arts. After high school, Feldman was admitted as a student at the Yale School of the Fine Arts in 1942.

== World War II service ==
From 1943 through 1946, Feldman served in the 330th Infantry Regiment of the 83rd Infantry Division, a unit that saw significant combat in the European theatre. During his tour of duty, Feldman was awarded 4 battle stars, the Purple Heart, and the combat infantry badge and reached the rank of 2nd Lieutenant. His service included action in the Allied Forces defense of the Ardennes forest during the German counter-offensive action known as the Battle of the Bulge. On January 6, 1945, while under heavy mortar and artillery fire, Feldman sustained shrapnel wounds to his lower back and lay strapped on the top of an Army jeep for five hours awaiting evacuation and treatment. His near death and harrowing rescue experiences left impressions that would manifest in the artist's work over the decades, as well as leaving him with a lifelong injury. Told he would likely never walk again while recuperating, he overcame the pain and injury, turning to painting as a form of healing. “Through the pain I learned how to paint too. Pain and painting, I learned the strange verbal connection”

World War II themes played a prominent role in Feldman's art throughout the decades. A study titled The Soldier is an early example of Feldman's sobering war experience. It is a macabre image of a skeleton-faced soldier, completed in 1946 when he returned from service. “I had many moving experiences during the war. One of them happened at a time when we were having two meals a day during combat. We were in line getting food, and we were pleased because we had cold rations for weeks. After I got my food, I started to walk down the steps of a nearby quarry to find a place to sit, and there was a dead German soldier with just his toes sticking out of his boot. Dead and cold. That was the memory I had when I did this painting tempura on cardboard”. Feldman dealt with the pain of war regularly in his art over the course of his career. Ardennes Skirmish a dark, brooding abstract painting he created in 1958 is another example that Feldman never ceased painting the haunting aftermath of his war experiences. During an oral interview in 1998 with Robert Brown from the Smithsonian's Archives of American Art, Feldman explained "You never forget it, and unfortunately it's true. I sit here and tell you that it happened more than fifty-- fifty years ago! And I remember every nuance, every smell, everything about it. It's unbelievable that you can have such a memory".

== Art education ==
Feldman re-enrolled at Yale in the Fall of 1946 and completed his BFA in 1950. He was awarded the Alice Kimball English Traveling Fellowship and spent a few months after graduation traveling in France and Italy and furthering his exposure to past masters and modern European artists. He returned to Yale as a graduate student, where his teachers included Willem de Kooning and Josef Albers, and received an MFA in 1951. As an undergraduate art student (1946-1950), Feldman worked on mastering technical painting skills in a realism style. HIs work The Mother is a “memory portrait” from this period.

Feldman joined the Yale faculty as an Instructor of Painting for the next two years. In 1953, he was appointed to the Brown University art department where he stayed until his retirement in 2007.

== 1950s-1960s ==
Feldman achieved his first major professional critical success when he received the print prize at the Metropolitan Museum of Art's American Watercolors, Drawings and Prints exhibition in 1952 for his woodcut The Final Agony. The print is now in the collection of Yale University, which also acquired the carved wood block.

The year 1953 marked the artist's first solo exhibition at the Artists' Gallery on Lexington Avenue in New York City and the inclusion of his paintings in a group show at New York's Kraushaar Galleries. The exhibited works demonstrated Feldman's stylist drift towards abstraction. Art Critic Dore Aston of Art Digest reviewed Feldman's 1953 exhibit and wrote, “In his first one-man show, this young painter hovers between French cubism and German expressionist, using the flat decorative shapes of the former and the vigorous distorted figures of the latter. The two languages are agreeably synthesized in smaller still-lifes.” Critic Howard Devree of The New York Times wrote, “the paintings exemplify the main concern of many modern painters—the reconciliation of subject matter with idiosyncratic and abstract painting language.” He concluded the show was “a remarkably mature first one-man exhibition of paintings...”

In 1957, Feldman received a Senior Fulbright Fellowship working in Rome with painting and studying mosaics as an apprentice to an Italian master. During the year, Feldman also traveled to Spain, the Middle East, Turkey, and Israel to study various mosaic styles. Feldman's self-portrait was awarded the gold medal at the Mostra Internazionale in Milan, followed by a solo exhibition at Milan's Grattacielo Gallery. His knowledge of mosaics permeated much of his future art, and many of his new paintings incorporated an impasto paint technique that gave the canvas a mosaic texture. Sicilian Cathedral is a work that demonstrates Feldman's use of small shapes with their own secondary directions to control a large area, similar to tesserae in a mosaic. That same year he completed two major commissions: a multicolor woodcut for the International Graphic Arts Society and a series of exterior mosaic pavements for the Temple Beth-El in Providence.

Feldman 's work was the subject of multiple solo exhibitions at Kraushaar Galleries in New York, as well the Decordova Museum in Massachusetts, the Providence Art Club, the Obelisk Gallery, Pace Gallery, and Kanegis Gallery in Boston, the Mexican-American Institute in Mexico City, and the Institute of Contemporary Arts in London. His themes included subject matter like death, war, and spiritual redemption and atonement. He continuously sifted and incorporated his translations of these themes onto his canvases with serious and provocative imagery. Lot's Wife, The Final Agony, Job, and The Sacrifice of Isaac are some of Feldman's biblically themed works from the 1950s; but like many modernists of his day, Feldman sought a new expressive vocabulary for these themes on his canvases. Poet James Schevill wrote of Feldman in a 1978 essay, “During the 1950s, although his work grew much freer, he hovered between the influence of the Abstract-Expressionists and his instinctive desire, from his Jewish, humanistic background, for symbolic subject matter.”

Feldman executed a large exterior mosaic mural for Temple Emanu-El in Providence, and that was followed by a commission to create seven stained glass windows for the Sugarman Memorial Chapel in Providence (1961). He was awarded the George A. and Eliza Gardener Howard Fellowship and spent 1962 painting in Mexico where he absorbed a great deal of the pre-Columbian imagery and culture. In 1968, Feldman designed and painted a 32-panel mural for the new meeting hall of Temple Emanu-el in Providence.

== Later years ==
Feldman was promoted to Professor of Art at Brown University in 1961 while continuing to create and exhibit his art in multiple media—painting, printmaking, sculpture, and mosaics. From 1985 on, he divided his time between painting and as a designer and publisher of artists' books under the Ziggurat press imprint. Feldman was the founder of the Ziggurat Press in Providence. His works are in over 100 public collections including the Holocaust Museum, the Smithsonian Institution, Archives of American Art in Washington, DC, Museum of Modern Art in New York, the Victoria and Albert Museum, the Yale University Art Gallery, and the Rhode Island School of Design Museum.

Feldman retired from teaching at Brown University in 2007, but he continued to create art and publish prints and books until his death in Providence on May 20, 2017. In 2013, he endowed the Walter Feldman Fellowship for Emerging Artists at the Arts & Business Council of Greater Boston. The Fellowship supports the professional career of a visual artist through providing a solo exhibition with curatorial and professional development guidance for their career. Upon his death, he also created the Walter S. Feldman Trust for Artwork at Brown University to maintain his works and provide funds for the institution.
