= Frank Walker =

Frank Walker may refer to:

== Architects and contractors ==
- Frank Walker (lumberman) (1843–1916), lumberman, contractor and builder
- Frank Arneil Walker (active from 2002), Scottish architectural academic and writer
- Frank Ray Walker, architect, partner in the firm of Walker and Weeks

== Arts and entertainment ==
- Frank Walker (musician), Canadian EDM DJ
- Frank Walker (musicologist) (1907–1962), English musicologist and biographer
- Frank Buckley Walker (1889–1963), American talent agent
- Frank X Walker (born 1961), American poet

== Military ==
- Frank R. Walker (1899–1976), American admiral during World War II
- Frank T.O. Walker (1878–1904), Philippine–American War Medal of Honor recipient

== Politics ==
- Frank Walker (Australian politician) (1942–2012), member of both the Australian House of Representatives and the New South Wales Legislative Assembly
- Frank Walker (Jersey politician), chief minister of Jersey, 2005–2008
- Frank C. Walker (1886–1959), chairman of the Democratic National Committee

== Sports ==
- Frank Walker (American football) (born 1981), American football cornerback
- Frank Walker (Australian rules footballer) (born 1933), Australian rules footballer for Perth Football Club and Western Australia
- Frank Walker (baseball) (1894–1974), Major League Baseball outfielder
- Frank Walker (rugby league), rugby league footballer of the 1930s and 1940s
- Frank Walker (Scottish footballer) (1897–1949), Scottish footballer with Third Lanark, Scotland

== Writers ==
- Frank Walker (writer, born 1954), Australian journalist and non-fiction writer
- Frank Walker (writer, born 1919) (1919–2008), his father, Australian journalist and non-fiction writer

== See also ==
- Francis Walker (disambiguation)
- Frank Welker (born 1946), American actor and voice actor
