= Frances Walker =

Frances Walker may refer to:

- Frances Walker (artist) (born 1930), Scottish painter and printmaker
- Frances Walker-Slocum (1924–2018), American educator, pianist, and organist
- F. Ann Walker (died 2022), American chemist

== See also ==
- Anna Frances Walker (1830–1913), Australian botanical collector and plant illustrator
- Francis Walker (disambiguation)
