= Gillenwater =

Gillenwater is a surname. Notable people with the surname include:

- Carden Gillenwater (1918–2000), American Major League Baseball player
- Claral Gillenwater (1900–1978), American Major League Baseball player
- James R. Gillenwater (1871–1946), American Medal of Honor recipient
- Jay Y. Gillenwater, co-discoverer of Schmitt Gillenwater Kelly syndrome, a genetic disease
