= Anthony Carson =

Anthony Carson may refer to:

- Anthony J. Carson (1869–1943), United States Army corporal and Medal of Honor recipient
- Anthony Carson (writer) (1907–1973), British journalist and travel writer
