= Charles Ray =

Charles Ray may refer to:

- Charles Ray (actor) (1891–1943), silent film star
- Charles Ray (artist) (born 1953), American sculptor
- Charles Ray (editor) (1874–1962), English editor of encyclopaedias, mainly for children
- Charles Ray (admiral) (fl. 2010s–2020s), United States Coast Guard admiral
- Charles Ray (Indiana judge) (1829–1912), Associate Justice of the Indiana Supreme Court
- Charles A. Ray (born 1945), U.S. diplomat and ambassador
- Charles Bennett Ray (1807–1886), African-American abolitionist and editor of The Colored American
- Charles R. Ray (1938–1982), US Army officer
- Charles W. Ray (1872–1959), Philippine–American War Medal of Honor recipient
- Chucky (Child's Play), Charles Lee Ray, main antagonist of the Child's Play franchise

== See also ==
- Ray Charles (disambiguation)
