= William Remsburg Grove =

American military officer (1872–1952)

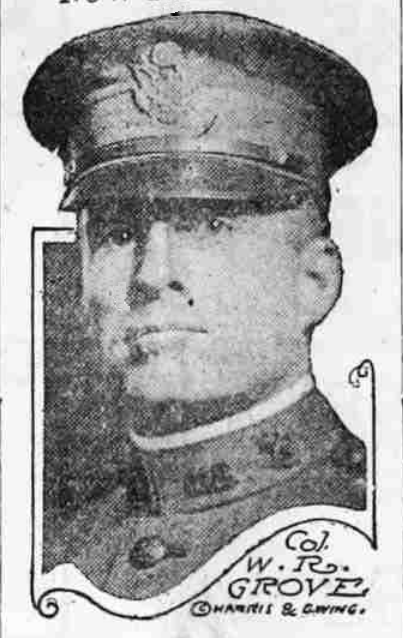
- Colonel W. R. Grove
- Born: May 16, 1872; Montezuma, Iowa, US
- Died: August 6, 1952 (aged 80); Venice, Florida, US
- Burial place: Manasota Memorial Park; Bradenton, Florida
- Military career
- Allegiance: United States
- Branch: United States Army
- Service years: 1898 – 1919
- Rank: Colonel
- Units: 36th Infantry, U.S. Volunteers; Quartermaster Corps
- Conflicts: Philippine–American War; World War I
- Awards: Medal of Honor; Legion of Honour; Order of Polonia Restituta; Distinguished Service Medal

William Remsburg Grove (May 16, 1872 – August 6, 1952) was an American soldier who received the Medal of Honor. During the Philippine–American War, he charged against a group of rebels and assisted his commanding officer (J. Franklin Bell) in killing or capturing all of them while armed with only a pistol. For this he was awarded the Medal of Honor in 1902.

== Early life ==
William Grove was born in Montezuma, Iowa, on May 16, 1872. He was the second of ten children born to Silas Wright and Angeline (née Crowell) Grove. Silas Grove fought with Company E, 15th Iowa Infantry during the American Civil War.

In his youth, Grove's family owned various newspapers in Iowa, Kansas and Colorado. All family members were expected to assist the fledgling newspapers, and Grove began working as a printer's devil at eight years old. In 1892, he enlisted in the Colorado National Guard, rising from the rank of private to captain by May 1, 1898.

== Military career ==
At the outbreak of the Spanish–American War, Grove was serving as the assistant adjutant general for Colorado. Colorado's initial contribution of troops to the war came in the form of the 1st Colorado Infantry Regiment. Grove's promotion to captain came at this time, and the unit was deployed to the Philippines in June. After the end of hostilities with Spain, the unit was retained to prepare for the Philippine Insurrection expected to follow. During this preparation, Grove was promoted to major on September 27, 1898. After the 1st Colorado Infantry were relieved by the 36th U. S. Volunteer Infantry, Grove joined that unit and was subsequently promoted to lieutenant colonel on July 5, 1899. On December 24, 1899, he was promoted to colonel. While in the Philippines, Grove participated in 32 hostile engagements, was wounded once, promoted three times, received five citations for bravery, and was twice recommended for the Medal of Honor. He was also recommended for brevet promotions and specifically called out by J. Franklin Bell, future Chief of Staff of the United States Army, for his heroism. Then Colonel Bell was Grove's commanding officer, and was the colonel mentioned in Grove's Medal of Honor citation. Then Major General Douglas MacArthur agreed, and personally recommended him for commission in the regular army.

Following his return to the United States in March 1901, Grove accepted a regular army commission as a captain and went on to serve various tours as quartermaster and commissary. One of these included his return to the Philippines, where he received high praise from Major General John F. Weston. He was promoted to major in December 1911. In April 1913, he was placed in charge of subsistence (food service) in support of the 1913 Gettysburg reunion, again receiving high praise from many, including Major General Leonard Wood and Pennsylvania Governor John K. Tener.

In 1914, he was ordered to the Panama Canal to subsequently serve as the chief quartermaster under then military Governor of Panama Canal Zone, General George Washington Goethals. He was promoted to lieutenant colonel in June 1917. At the outbreak of the United States' entry into World War I, Goethals was brought back to active duty to serve as Acting Quartermaster General of the United States Army. Goebels, impressed by Grove's service in Panama, immediately tasked Grove to "take charge of everything connected with feeding the Army." Grove was promoted to colonel on January 12, 1918.

Grove then reorganized the subsistence division and made it ready to serve the growing wartime army, both at home and abroad. In June 1918, Grove was sent to France to ensure efficient transfer of supplies to the front lines. In October, Groves was reassigned to Paris to serve as Chief Purchasing Officer under General Charles G. Dawes, where he served until December 22, 1918.

For his war time service, he was awarded the United States Distinguished Service Medal. He was also awarded France's Legion of Honour (Officier).

On April 1, 1924, the War Department conferred on him five Silver Citation Stars for his Philippine Campaign Medal. He was awarded he Silver Star with four oak leaf clusters and the Purple Heart when both decorations were created in 1932.

== Postwar ==
His work supporting the U.S. Army in France impressed future President Herbert Hoover, then in charge of the American Relief Administration, who sent Grove to Poland to oversee the 100 million dollar effort there. His success was noted by both Hoover and Ignacy Jan Paderewski, the first Prime Minister of Poland. The Republic of Poland awarded him the Order of Polonia Restituta in recognition of his service to their country.

When he returned from Europe, Grove resigned from the army and entered private business. He spent nine months in Chicago, Illinois Chicago with Wilson and Company meat packers and two years in Rockaway, New Jersey with the 4-One Box Machine Makers (now the Stapling Machines Company).

In 1922, Herbert Hoover requested he led the Ukraine section of the Joint Distribution Committee for Relief Work, under the auspices of the American Relief Administration’s effort during the Russian famine of 1921–22.

In May 1923, Grove returned to work for Wilson and Company, where he remained until 1940. He managed several locations from 1923 to 1930. In 1931, he was elected vice president of the company, serving in their Chicago office.

In 1940, Grove retired to Laurel, Florida. He began research into horticulture and experimented with planting tropical fruit in the area. The final result was his establishing the lychee as a staple crop of the region. He is also credited with the first ever using plastic wrap to augment air layering of plants, a method he started in 1947 in the course of propagating lychee.

== Personal life ==
On December 7, 1897, Grove married Flora Graham in Denver, Colorado. They had two sons: William Remsburg Grove Jr. (1902–1978) and Graham Crowell Grove (1904–1915). William Remsburg Grove Jr. graduated from the United States Military Academy in 1923, served in the U.S. Army and retired in Florida as a colonel.

On July 25, 1952, Grove suffered a heart attack and was transported to Venice Memorial Hospital, where he died on August 6, 1952.

In accordance with his will, he was cremated and inurned in Manasota Memorial Park, in Bradenton, Florida.

== Awards and honors ==
=== Medal of Honor citation ===
Rank and organization: Lieutenant Colonel, 36th Infantry, U.S. Volunteers. Place and date: Near Porac, Luzon, Philippine Islands, 9 September 1899. Entered service at: Denver, Colo. Birth: Montezuma, Iowa. Date of issue: 16 July 1902.

Citation:

In advance of his regiment, rushed to the assistance of his colonel, charging, pistol in hand, seven insurgents, and compelling surrender of all not killed or wounded.

=== Distinguished Service Medal ===
Citation:

For exceptionally meritorious and distinguished services as assistant to the Chief of the Supply Division, Quartermaster General’s Office, a position of great responsibility. He was charged with the procurement of the subsistence supplies of the army in the United States and France, and to him is due the organization of the subsistence division of the Office of the Quartermaster General. In cooperation with the Food Administration, he made arrangements for the procurement of all subsistence supplies required for the Army. He rendered services of much value.

=== Silver Star citations ===
For gallantry in action in connection with operations against a hostile force, August 1898, near Fort San Antonio de Abad, Philippine Islands.

For gallantry in action against Insurgent forces near Manila, Philippine Islands, February 5, 1899.

For gallantry in action against Insurgent forces at Bacolor, Luzon, Philippine Islands, August 9, 1899.

For gallantry in action against Insurgent forces near Porac, Luzon, Philippine Islands, October 17, 1899.

For gallantry in action against Insurgent forces near Porac, Luzon, Philippine Islands, November 3, 1899.

=== Other military awards ===
- Spanish Campaign Medal
- Philippine Campaign Medal
- World War I Victory Medal

== Bibliography ==
Grove also authored books based on his experiences in Poland and in propagating Lychees.

- Grove, William Remsburg (1940). War's Aftermath: Polish Relief in 1919. House of Field.
- Grove, William Remsburg (1951). The Lychee in Florida (New series).

== See also ==
- List of Medal of Honor recipients
- List of Philippine–American War Medal of Honor recipients
