= William Maclay =

William Maclay may refer to:

- William Maclay (Pennsylvania politician, born 1737) (1737–1804), United States Senator from Pennsylvania
- William Maclay (Pennsylvania politician, born 1765) (1765–1825), United States Representative from Pennsylvania
- William Plunkett Maclay (1774–1842), United States Representative from Pennsylvania, nephew of the senator
- William B. Maclay (1812–1882), United States Representative from New York
- William P. Maclay (Medal of Honor) (1877–1943), Philippine Insurrection Medal of Honor recipient

== See also ==
- William Macleay (disambiguation)
