= List of Philippine–American War Medal of Honor recipients =

The Philippine–American War was an armed military conflict between the United States and the First Philippine Republic, fought from 1899 to at least 1902, which arose from a Filipino political struggle against U.S. occupation of the Philippines. While the conflict was officially declared over on July 4, 1902, American troops continued hostilities against remnants of the Philippine Army and other resistance groups until 1913, and some historians consider these unofficial extensions part of the war.

The Medal of Honor was created during the American Civil War and is the highest military decoration presented by the United States government to a member of its armed forces. The recipient must have distinguished themselves at the risk of their own life above and beyond the call of duty in action against an enemy of the United States. Due to the nature of this medal, it is commonly presented posthumously.

Eighty-one men were awarded the Medal of Honor for their actions in the Philippine–American War: 70 from the Army, 5 from the Navy, and 6 from the Marine Corps. Four of the awards were posthumous. Among the recipients were Webb Hayes, the son of former U.S. President Rutherford B. Hayes, and two prominent Marine Corps officers, Hiram I. Bearss and David Dixon Porter. Bearss became known for leading long-range reconnaissance patrols behind enemy lines and was later wounded as a colonel in World War I. Porter was from a distinguished military family and rose to become a major general. José B. Nísperos, a member of the Philippine Scouts who was honored for continuing to fight after being wounded, was the first Asian recipient of the Medal of Honor.

== Recipients ==
This with the * indicates that the Medal of Honor was awarded posthumously

Note: Notes in quotations are derived or are copied in their entirety from the actual Medal of Honor citation

Image	Name	Service	Rank	Place of action	Date of action	Unit	Notes
	Frank L. Anders	Army	Corporal	San Miguel de Mayumo, Luzon	May 13, 1899	Company B, 1st North Dakota Volunteer Infantry	With 11 other scouts, completely routed about 300 of the enemy
	Matthew A. Batson	Army	First Lieutenant	Calamba, Luzon	July 26, 1899	4th U.S. Cavalry	"Swam the San Juan River in the face of the enemy's fire and [forced them to retreat]"
	Hiram I. Bearss	Marine Corps	Captain	junction of the Cadacan and Sohoton Rivers, Samar	November 17, 1901	Marine Corps	Subsequently awarded the Distinguished Service Cross (United States) for actions in World War I
—	Harry Bell	Army	Captain	Near Porac, Luzon	October 17, 1899	36th Infantry, U.S. Volunteers	"Led a successful charge against a superior force, capturing and dispersing the enemy and relieving other members of his regiment from a perilous position"
	J. Franklin Bell	Army	Colonel	Near Porac, Luzon	September 9, 1899	36th Infantry, U.S. Volunteers	Later became Chief of Staff of the United States Army
	Charles G. Bickham	Army	First Lieutenant	Bayong, near Lake Lanao, Mindanao	May 2, 1902	27th U.S. Infantry	"Crossed a fire-swept field, in close range of the enemy, and brought a wounded soldier to a place of shelter"
—	George W. Biegler	Army	Captain	Near Loac, Luzon	October 21, 1900	28th Infantry, U.S. Volunteers	"With but 19 men resisted and at close quarters defeated 300 of the enemy"
	William E. Birkhimer	Army	Captain	San Miguel de Mayumo, Luzon	May 13, 1899	3d U.S. Artillery	"With 12 men charged and routed 300 of the enemy"
—	Otto Boehler	Army	Private	Near San Isidro	May 16, 1899	Company I, 1st North Dakota Volunteer Infantry	"With 21 other scouts completely routed 600 of the enemy"
—	Howard Major Buckley	Marine Corps	Private	Luzon	March 25, 1899; March 27, 1899; March 29, 1899; April 4, 1899	Marine Corps	"For distinguished conduct in the presence of the enemy in battle"
	Bernard A. Byrne	Army	Captain	Bobong, Negros	July 19, 1899	6th U.S. Infantry	Rallied his men on the bridge after the line had been broken and pushed back
—	Anthony J. Carson	Army	Corporal	Catubig, Samar	April 15, 1900 – April 19, 1900	Company H, 43d Infantry, U.S. Volunteers	"Assumed command of a detachment and withstood the attacks of a large enemy force for 2 days, saving the lives of the survivors and protecting the wounded until relief came"
—	Charles Cawetzka	Army	Private	Near Sariaya, Luzon	August 23, 1900	Company F, 30th Infantry, U.S. Volunteers	"Single-handed, he defended a disabled comrade against a greatly superior force of the enemy"
—	Josephus S. Cecil	Army	First Lieutenant	Bud-Dajo, Jolo	March 7, 1906	19th U.S. Infantry	Risked his life to carry a wounded man and the body of one who was killed beside him
—	Clarence M. Condon	Army	Sergeant	Near Calulut, Luzon	November 5, 1899	Battery G, 3d U.S. Artillery	"While in command of a detachment of 4 men, charged and routed 40 entrenched insurgents, inflicting on them heavy loss.
—	Charles P. Davis	Army	Private	Near San Isidro	May 16, 1899	Company G, 1st North Dakota Volunteer Infantry	"With 21 other scouts completely routed 600 of the enemy"
—	Willis H. Downs	Army	Private	San Miguel de Mayumo, Luzon	May 13, 1899	Company H, 1st North Dakota Volunteer Infantry	With 11 other scouts, completely routed about 300 of the enemy
—	Joseph L. Epps	Army	Private	Vigan, Luzon	December 4, 1899	Company B, 33d Infantry, U.S. Volunteers	"Discovered a party of insurgents inside a wall, climbed to the top of the wall, covered them with his gun, and forced them to stack arms and surrender."
	Arthur M. Ferguson	Army	First Lieutenant	Near Porac, Luzon	September 28, 1899	36th Infantry, U.S. Volunteers	"Charged alone a body of the enemy and captured a captain"
—	Joseph Fitz	Navy	Ordinary Seaman	On board the USS Pampanga, Mount Dajo Jolo	March 8, 1906	USS Pampanga (PG-39)	For displaying bravery and extraordinary heroism in the presence of the enemy
—	Andrew P. Forbeck	Navy	Seaman	On board the USS Pampanga, during the battle of Katbalogan, Samar	July 16, 1900	USS Pampanga (PG-39)	"For distinguished conduct in the presence of the enemy during battle"
	Frederick Funston	Army	Colonel	Rio Grande de la Pampanga, Luzon	April 27, 1899	20th Kansas Volunteer Infantry	Riverine operations in Luzon
—	Robert Galbraith	Navy	Gunner's Mate Third Class	El Pardo, Cebu	September 12, 1899 – September 13, 1899	—	For extraordinary heroism and gallantry while under fire of the enemy
	Sterling A. Galt	Army	Artificer	Bamban, Luzon	November 9, 1899	Company F, 36th Infantry, U.S. Volunteers	"Distinguished bravery and conspicuous gallantry in action against insurgents"
—	Antoine A. M. Gaujot	Army	Corporal	Battle of Paye, San Mateo	December 19, 1899	Company M, 27th Infantry, U.S. Volunteers	Brother of Julien E. V. Gaujot, also a Medal of Honor recipient, First recipient from Virginia Tech
—	Louis Gedeon	Army	Private	Mount Amia, Cebu	February 4, 1900	Company G, 19th U.S. Infantry	"Singlehanded, defended his mortally wounded captain from an overwhelming force of the enemy"
—	Edward H. Gibson	Army	Sergeant	San Mateo	December 19, 1899	Company M, 27th Infantry, U.S. Volunteers	"Attempted under a heavy fire of the enemy to swim a river for the purpose of obtaining and returning with a canoe"
—	James R. Gillenwater	Army	Corporal	Near Porac, Luzon	September 3, 1899	Company A, 36th Infantry, U.S. Volunteers	"While on a scout drove off a superior force of insurgents and with the assistance of 1 comrade brought from the field of action the bodies of 2 comrades, 1 killed and the other severely wounded."
	Allen J. Greer	Army	Second Lieutenant	Near Majada, Laguna Province	July 2, 1901	4th U.S. Infantry	"Charged alone an insurgent outpost with his pistol, killing 1, wounding 2, and capturing 3 insurgents with their rifles and equipment."
	William R. Grove	Army	Lieutenant Colonel	Near Porac, Luzon	September 9, 1899	36th Infantry, U.S. Volunteers	"In advance of his regiment, rushed to the assistance of his colonel, charging, pistol in hand, 7 insurgents, and compelling surrender of all not killed or wounded."
—	Harry Harvey	Marine Corps	Sergeant	Benictican, Bataan Province	February 16, 1900	Marine Corps	Distinguished himself by meritorious conduct in the presence of the enemy
	Webb Hayes	Army	Lieutenant Colonel	Vigan, Luzon	December 4, 1899	31st Infantry, U.S. Volunteers	Son of former President of the U.S. Rutherford B. Hayes
—	Joseph Henderson	Army	Sergeant	Patian Island	July 2, 1909	Troop B, 6th U.S. Cavalry	For bravery in action during the Moro Uprising
—	Frank C. High	Army	Private	Near San Isidro	May 16, 1899	Young's Scouts, Company G, 2nd Oregon Volunteer Infantry Regiment	"With 21 other scouts charged across a burning bridge, under heavy fire, and completely routed 600 of the enemy who were entrenched in a strongly fortified position."
—	John A. Huntsman	Army	Sergeant	Bamban, Luzon	November 9, 1899	Company E, 36th Infantry, U.S. Volunteers	"For distinguished bravery and conspicuous gallantry in action against insurgents"
—	Gotfred Jensen	Army	Private	San Miguel de Mayumo, Luzon	May 13, 1899	Company D, 1st North Dakota Volunteer Infantry	"With 11 other scouts, without waiting for the supporting battalion to aid them or to get into a position to do so, charged over a distance of about 150 yards (140 m) and completely routed about 300 of the enemy, who were in line and in a position that could only be carried by a frontal attack"
	Gordon Johnston	Army	First Lieutenant	Mount Bud Dajo, Jolo	March 7, 1906	Signal Corps	"Voluntarily took part in and was dangerously wounded during an assault on the enemy's works."
—	John T. Kennedy	Army	Second Lieutenant	Patian Island	July 4, 1909	6th U.S. Cavalry	"While in action against hostile Moros, he entered with a few enlisted men the mouth of a cave occupied by a desperate enemy, this act having been ordered after he had volunteered several times. In this action 2d Lt. Kennedy was severely wounded."
	Charles E. Kilbourne	Army	First Lieutenant	Paco Bridge	February 5, 1899	U.S. Volunteer Signal Corps	"Within a range of 250 yards (230 m) of the enemy and in the face of a rapid fire climbed a telegraph pole at the east end of the bridge and in full view of the enemy coolly and carefully repaired a broken telegraph wire, thereby reestablishing telegraphic communication to the front."
	John B. Kinne	Army	Private	Near San Isidro	May 16, 1899	Company B, 1st North Dakota Infantry	"With 21 other scouts charged across a burning bridge, under heavy fire, and completely routed 600 of the enemy who were entrenched in a strongly fortified position."
—	Cornelius J. Leahy*	Army	Private	Near Porac, Luzon	September 3, 1899	Company A, 36th Infantry, U.S. Volunteers	"Distinguished gallantry in action in driving off a superior force and with the assistance of 1 comrade brought from the field of action the bodies of 2 comrades, 1 killed and the other severely wounded, this while on a scout."
—	Joseph Leonard	Marine Corps	Private	Luzon	March 25, 1899; March 27, 1899; March 29, 1899; April 4, 1899	Marine Corps	Enlisted as Joseph Melvin
	John A. Logan*	Army	Major	San Jacinto	November 11, 1899	33d Infantry, U.S. Volunteers	"For most distinguished gallantry in leading his battalion upon the entrenchments of the enemy, on which occasion he fell mortally wounded"
—	Richard M. Longfellow	Army	Private	Near San Isidro	May 16, 1899	Company A, 1st North Dakota Volunteer Infantry	"With 21 other scouts charged across a burning bridge, under heavy fire, and completely routed 600 of the enemy who were entrenched in a strongly fortified position."
—	Edward E. Lyon	Army	Private	San Miguel de Mayumo, Luzon	May 13, 1899	Company B, 2nd Oregon Volunteer Infantry Regiment (Young's Scouts)	"With 11 other scouts, without waiting for the supporting battalion to aid them or to get into position to do so, charged over a distance of about 150 yards (140 m) and completely routed about 300 of the enemy, who were in line and in a position that could only be carried by a frontal attack."
—	William P. Maclay	Army	Private	Hilongas, Leyte	May 6, 1900	Company A, 43d Infantry, U.S. Volunteers	"Charged an occupied bastion, saving the life of an officer in a hand-to-hand combat and destroying the enemy"
	George W. Mathews	Army	Captain (Assistant Surgeon)	Near Labo, Luzon	October 29, 1899	36th Infantry, U.S. Volunteers	"While in attendance upon the wounded and under a severe fire from the enemy, seized a carbine and beat off an attack upon wounded officers and men under his charge."
—	James McConnell	Army	Private	Vigan, Luzon	December 4, 1899	Company B, 33d Infantry, U.S. Volunteers	"Fought for hours lying between 2 dead comrades, notwithstanding his hat was pierced, his clothing plowed through by bullets, and his face cut and bruised by flying gravel."
—	Hugh J. McGrath*	Army	Captain	Calamba, Luzon	July 26, 1899	4th U.S. Cavalry	"Swam the San Juan River in the face of the enemy's fire and drove him from his entrenchments"
	Archie Miller	Army	First Lieutenant	Patian Island	July 2, 1909	6th U.S. Cavalry	Defended a machine gun from capture by the enemy along with Sergeant Joseph Henderson
—	John E. Moran	Army	Captain	Near Mabitac, Laguna, Luzon	September 17, 1900	Company L, 37th Infantry, U.S. Volunteers	"After the attacking party had become demoralized, fearlessly led a small body of troops under a severe fire and through water waist deep in the attack against the enemy."
—	Louis C. Mosher	Army	Second Lieutenant	Gagsak Mountain, Jolo	June 11, 1913	Philippine Scouts	"Voluntarily entered a cleared space within about 20 yards (18 m) of the Moro trenches under a furious fire from them and carried a wounded soldier of his company to safety at the risk of his own life."
—	José B. Nísperos	Army	Private	Lapurap, Basilan	September 24, 1911	34th Company, Philippine Scouts	"Having been badly wounded continued to fire his rifle with one hand until the enemy was repulsed, thereby aiding materially in preventing the annihilation of his party and the mutilation of their bodies"
—	Joseph A. Nolan	Army	Artificer	Labo, Luzon	May 29, 1900	Company B, 45th Infantry, U.S. Volunteers	"Voluntarily left shelter and at great personal risk passed the enemy's lines and brought relief to besieged comrades"
	James Parker	Army	Lieutenant Colonel	Vigan, Luzon	December 4, 1899	45th Infantry, U.S. Volunteers	"While in command of a small garrison repulsed a savage night attack by overwhelming numbers of the enemy, fighting at close quarters in the dark for several hours."
—	Charles H. Pierce	Army	Private	Near San Isidro, Luzon	October 19, 1899	Company I, 22d U.S. Infantry	"Held a bridge against a superior force of the enemy and fought, though severely wounded, until the main body came up to cross."
	David D. Porter	Marine Corps	Captain	junction of the Cadacan and Sohoton Rivers, Samar	November 17, 1901	Marine Corps	Grandson of Admiral David Dixon Porter
—	Thomas F. Prendergast	Marine Corps	Corporal	Luzon	March 25, 1899; March 27, 1899; March 29, 1899; April 5, 1899	Marine Corps	"For distinguished conduct in the presence of the enemy in battle"
—	Peter H. Quinn	Army	Private	San Miguel de Mayumo, Luzon	May 13, 1899	Company L, 4th U.S. Cavalry	"With 11 other scouts without waiting for the supporting battalion to aid them or to get into a position to do so, charged over a distance of about 150 yards (140 m) and completely routed about 300 of the enemy who were in line and in a position that could only be carried by a frontal attack."
—	Charles W. Ray	Army	Sergeant	Near San Isidro, Luzon	October 19, 1899	Company I, 22d U.S. Infantry	"Captured a bridge with the detachment he commanded and held it against a superior force of the enemy, thereby enabling an army to come up and cross."
—	Marcus W. Robertson	Army	Private	Near San Isidro	May 16, 1899	Company B, 2d Oregon Volunteer Infantry	"With 21 other scouts charged across a burning bridge, under heavy fire, and completely routed 600 of the enemy who were entrenched in a strongly fortified position."
—	Frank F. Ross	Army	Private	Near San Isidro	May 16, 1899	Company H, 1st North Dakota Volunteer Infantry	"With 21 other scouts charged across a burning bridge, under heavy fire, and completely routed 600 of the enemy who were entrenched in a strongly fortified position."
	William H. Sage	Army	Captain	Near Zapote River, Luzon	June 13, 1899	23d U.S. Infantry	"With 9 men volunteered to hold an advanced position and held it against a terrific fire of the enemy estimated at 1,000 strong. Taking a rifle from a wounded man, and cartridges from the belts of others, Capt. Sage himself killed 5 of the enemy."
—	Henry F. Schroeder	Army	Sergeant	Carig	September 14, 1900	Company L, 16th U.S. Infantry	"With 22 men defeated 400 insurgents, killing 36 and wounding 90"
	George C. Shaw	Army	First Lieutenant	Fort Pitacus, Lake Lanao, Mindanao	May 4, 1903	27th U.S. Infantry	"For distinguished gallantry in leading the assault and, under a heavy fire from the enemy, maintaining alone his position on the parapet after the first 3 men who followed him there had been killed or wounded, until a foothold was gained by others and the capture of the place assured."
—	George M. Shelton	Army	Private	La Paz, Leyte	April 26, 1900	Company I, 23d U.S. Infantry	"Advanced alone under heavy fire of the enemy and rescued a wounded comrade"
	George F. Shiels	Army	Major (Surgeon)	Tuliahan River	March 25, 1899	U.S. Volunteers	"Voluntarily exposed himself to the fire of the enemy and went with 4 men to the relief of 2 native Filipinos Iying wounded about 150 yards (140 m) in front of the lines and personally carried one of them to a place of safety."
—	Thomas Sletteland	Army	Private	Near Paete, Luzon	April 12, 1899	Company C, 1st North Dakota Infantry	"Single-handed and alone defended his dead and wounded comrades against a greatly superior force of the enemy"
—	George E. Stewart	Army	Second Lieutenant	Passi, Iloilo, Island of Panay	November 26, 1899	19th U.S. Infantry	"While crossing a river in face of the enemy, this officer plunged in and at the imminent risk of his own life saved from drowning an enlisted man of his regiment."
—	Andrew V. Stoltenberg	Navy	Gunner's Mate Second Class	Katbalogan, Samar	July 16, 1900	—	"For distinguished conduct in the presence of the enemy in battle"
	Paul F. Straub	Army	Major (Surgeon)	Alos, Zambales, Luzon	December 21, 1899	36th Infantry, U.S. Volunteers	"Voluntarily exposed himself to a hot fire from the enemy in repelling with pistol fire an insurgent attack and at great risk of his own life went under fire to the rescue of a wounded officer and carried him to a place of safety."
—	William G. Thordsen	Navy	Coxswain	Hilongas	May 6, 1900	—	"For heroism and gallantry under fire of the enemy"
—	William B. Trembley	Army	Private	Calumpit, Luzon	April 27, 1899	Company B, 20th Kansas Volunteer Infantry	"Swam the Rio Grande de Pampanga in face of the enemy's fire and fastened a rope to the occupied trenches, thereby enabling the crossing of the river and the driving of the enemy from his fortified position."
—	Louis J. Van Schaick	Army	First Lieutenant	Near Nasugbu, Batangas	November 23, 1901	4th U.S. Infantry	"While in pursuit of a band of insurgents was the first of his detachment to emerge from a canyon, and seeing a column of insurgents and fearing they might turn and dispatch his men as they emerged one by one from the canyon, galloped forward and closed with the insurgents, thereby throwing them into confusion until the arrival of others of the detachment."
—	Frank O. Walker	Army	Private	Near Taal, Luzon	January 18, 1900	Company F, 46th Infantry, U.S. Volunteers	"Under heavy fire of the enemy he rescued a dying comrade who was sinking beneath the water"
—	George W. Wallace	Army	Second Lieutenant	Tinuba, Luzon	March 4, 1900	9th U.S. Infantry	"With another officer and a native Filipino, was shot at from an ambush, the other officer falling severely wounded. 2d Lt. Wallace fired in the direction of the enemy, put them to rout, removed the wounded officer from the path, returned to the town, a mile distant, and summoned assistance from his command."
—	Amos Weaver	Army	Sergeant	Between Calubus and Malalong	November 5, 1899	Company F, 36th Infantry, U.S. Volunteers	"Alone and unaided, charged a body of 15 insurgents, dislodging them, killing 4 and wounding several."
—	Seth L. Weld	Army	Corporal	La Paz, Leyte	December 5, 1906	Company L, 8th U.S. Infantry	"With his right arm cut open with a bolo, went to the assistance of a wounded constabulary officer and a fellow soldier who were surrounded by about 40 Pulajanes, and, using his disabled rifle as a club, beat back the assailants and rescued his party."
—	John C. Wetherby*	Army	Private	Near Imus, Luzon	November 20, 1899	Company L, 4th U.S. Infantry	"While carrying important orders on the battlefield, was desperately wounded and, being unable to walk, crawled far enough to deliver his orders."
—	Edward White	Army	Private	Calumpit, Luzon	April 27, 1899	Company B, 20th Kansas Volunteer Infantry	"Swam the Rio Grande de Pampanga in face of the enemy's fire and fastened a rope to occupied trenches, thereby enabling the crossing of the river and the driving of the enemy from his fortified position."
	Arthur H. Wilson	Army	Second Lieutenant	Patian Island	July 4, 1909	6th U.S. Cavalry	"While in action against hostile Moros, when, it being necessary to secure a mountain gun in position by rope and tackle, voluntarily with the assistance of an enlisted man, carried the rope forward and fastened it, being all the time under heavy fire of the enemy at short range."
