= Matthew Arlington Batson =

US Army officer and Medal of Honor recipient (1866–1917)

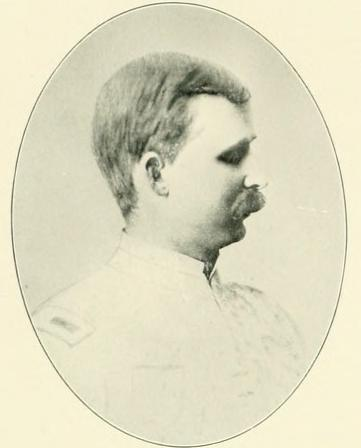
- Matthew A. Batson
- Born: April 24, 1866; Anna, Illinois, US
- Died: January 13, 1917 (aged 50)
- Burial place: Arlington National Cemetery
- Military career
- Allegiance: United States
- Branch: United States Army
- Service years: 1888–1902
- Rank: Major
- Units: 2nd Cavalry Regiment; 4th Cavalry Regiment Batson's Macabebe Scouts
- Conflicts: Spanish–American War Philippine–American War
- Awards: Medal of Honor

Matthew Arlington Batson (Anna, Illinois, US, 24 April 1866 – 13 January 1917) was a United States Army Officer who received the Medal of Honor for actions during the Philippine–American War. 1st Lieutenant Batson was awarded the medal for swimming the San Juan River under enemy fire. He was awarded his medal alongside Captain Hugh J. McGrath who performed the same feat. Batson is most noted, however, for creating the Philippine Scouts.

== Early life ==
Batson was born in Anna Illinois, a small agricultural town located on the Illinois Central Railroad in Union County in southern Illinois but grew up in the Ozark Mountains of Missouri. Educated locally, he attended Southern Illinois University for one term. He had two stints of teaching school and spent a year studying law in hopes of passing the bar exam.

== Military record ==
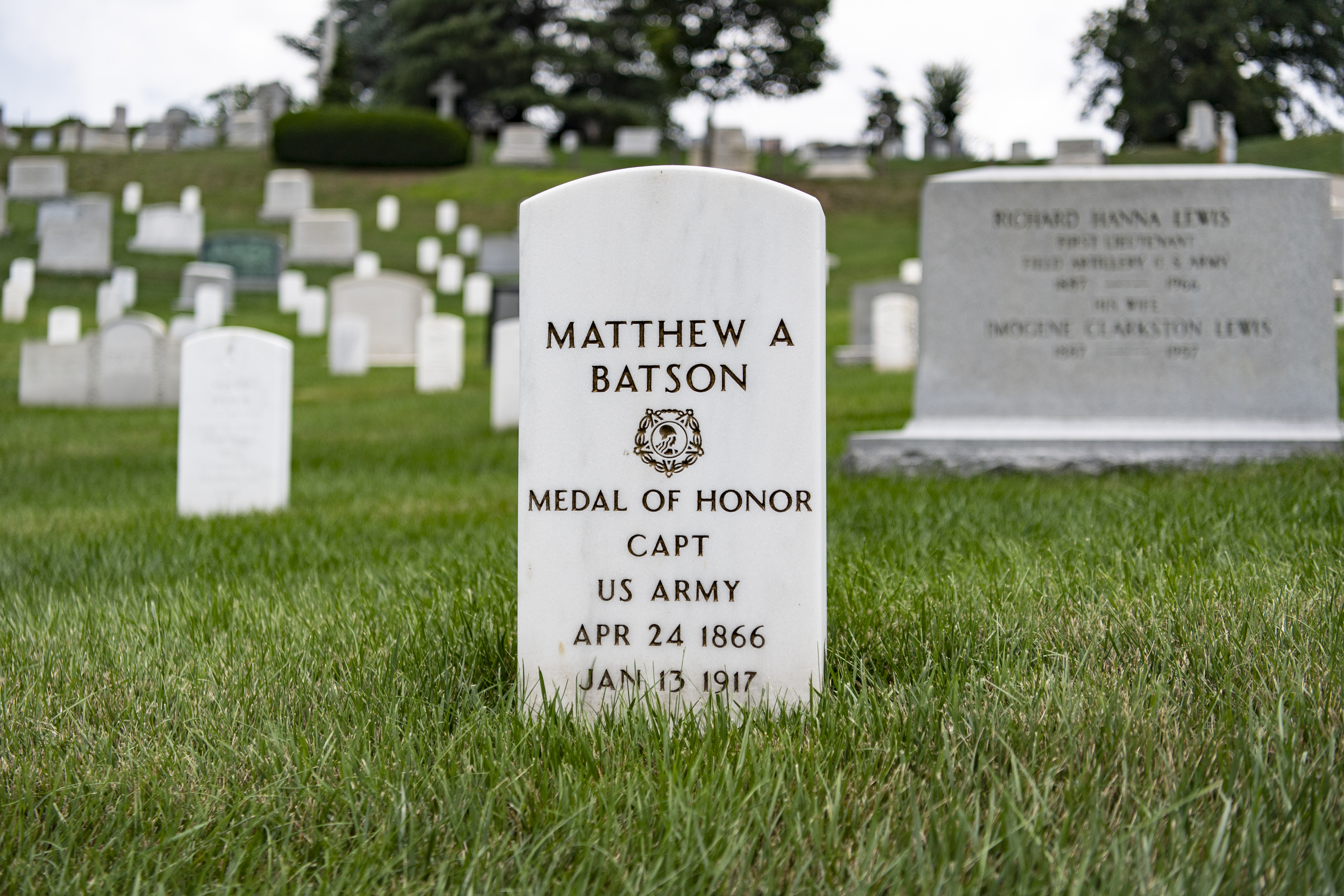
Grave at Arlington National Cemetery

Batson enlisted in the 2nd United States Cavalry on April 9, 1888. Over the next three years he served in troops M and G and attained the rank of corporal. Based on his service record and his marks on a competitive examination, the War Department offered him a commission as second lieutenant in the 9th Cavalry, one of two Regular Army cavalry regiments that consisted of black enlisted men led by white officers. He accepted on August 2, 1891. He spent the next seven years in the 9th Cavalry, primarily in garrison. He married and started to raise a family. During the academic year 1894–95 he attended the Infantry and Cavalry School at Fort Leavenworth, Kansas. Three years later, during the Spanish–American War, he accompanied the 9th Cavalry to Cuba and participated in the V Corps' campaign against Santiago. He had a credible record in combat at San Juan Hill, but the experience left him disillusioned. He felt that officers who had done less than he had received promotion and recognition while he had received none. On August 2, 1898, Batson was promoted first lieutenant in the 4th Cavalry. Since 1891 promotion in the U.S. Army for all officers was by seniority in branch of service rather than by regiment, his promotion indicated that he was the senior cavalry second lieutenant in the Army at that time and that the next available vacancy at the grade of first lieutenant occurred in the 4th Cavalry. It did not constitute official recognition of his service in Cuba.

Batson accompanied the 4th Cavalry to the Philippines, arriving in October 1898, and joined the VIII Corps, then occupying only the city of Manila and a small area around the Cavite naval base. Initially, the corps commander, Maj. Gen. Elwell S. Otis, assigned the regiment to the 1st Division, VIII Corps, then commanded by Brig. Gen. Thomas M. Anderson and subsequently by Maj. General Henry W. Lawton. Eventually, Otis assigned a few troops of the 4th Cavalry to the 2nd Division but kept the bulk of the regiment with the 1st Division. Batson's troop remained with the 1st Division.

Fighting broke out between Philippine and American forces on the night of February 4–5 in what was the first clash of a war known as the Philippine Insurrection in the United States, but which subsequent historians have often referred to as the Philippine War or the Philippine–American War. The 2nd Division guarded the northern approaches to Manila; the 1st Division the southern. Once the VIII Corps had cleared the Filipinos from the immediate environs of the city, all the strategic objectives—the only railroad in the Philippines and the Philippine capital at Malolos—lay north of the city. While the 2nd Division attacked north along the rail line toward Malolos, the 1st Division's mission became to keep any elements of the Philippine Army away from the city by launching punitive expeditions into the countryside to break up enemy troop concentrations. On one of these expeditions to Laguna Province, south of Manila, at the town of Calamba, Batson swam the San Juan River under fire, flanked enemy forces, and compelled them to retire. His commanding officer recommended him for the Medal of Honor. Two and a half years later, he received it.

Batson, a lieutenant, had arrived in the Philippines disenchanted with the Army, unlike most of peers with seven years service in a predominately African-American regiment. He reached the Islands predisposed to judge people of color on their merits as individuals and not lump them together as racial inferiors.

A lieutenant's pay in the Philippines would go much further than in the United States, so sometime after Batson arrived, he hired a body servant: a Filipino named Jacinto. Jacinto could already read and write when they first met, and Batson studied language with him. Jacinto taught Batson Pampangan; Batson taught Jacinto English. Batson reported to his wife that Jacinto learned English faster than he learned Pampangan. Batson also learned that he came from the town of Macabebe in the province of Pampanga, north and west of Manila. The Macabebes are an ancient ethnic group whose origins are disputed. Since the sixteenth century they have had a fraught relationship with the Tagalogs, the largest ethnic group in the Philippines. In 1896 when the Tagalogs rose in rebellion against the Spanish, the Macabebes supported the Spanish colonial government. When war broke out between the Americans and the self-proclaimed Philippine Republic led by Emilio Aguinaldo, the Macabebes maintained neutrality toward both sides.

Batson's impressions of the war were slowly crystallizing in the spring of 1899. He admired the fighting qualities of his opponents, and did not call them "Gugus" or use the N-word as many of his fellow officers did. He discounted the many rumors circulating in the VIII Corps about Filipino atrocities. He wrote his wife that if he was a Filipino he would be fighting the Americans too. He thought to subdue the Islanders would require an Army of 100,000 men and many years—the cost in lives and money was far more, he thought, than the American people could stand. The only solution, he decided, was to raise native troops to fight against the Philippine revolutionary government. They would cost far less to equip and maintain than unacclimated Americans shipped across the Pacific Ocean. Accompanied by two captains, a newspaper reporter, and forty enlisted men, he set off for the town of Macabebe sometime before June 1, 1899. The idea of raising a company of Macabebes never got off the ground, but he was very impressed with the inhabitants, who warmly welcomed the Americans. He came away impressed by their military potential and certain that a native force was not only feasible but necessary for American victory.

Batson's subsequent battlefield heroics called him to the attention of his division commander, General Lawton, who was also a Medal of Honor winner in the Civil War. Lawton liked Batson's idea of raising companies of Filipino volunteers and in September convinced a skeptical General Otis to allow Batson to raise two experimental companies of what were soon called "Batson's Macabebe Scouts."

Batson quickly organized the first company of 108 men, all of them "well disciplined and brave" veterans of the Spanish colonial army. Within days he and his company had driven the insurgents out of two villages. Within a week he had recruited another company, also full of veterans. He thought his men could serve as an example to the Americans, especially the volunteers, in discipline and in observing the rules of war. "The men," he told his wife, "were not one-fourth as hard to control as our own men." In October, Lawton, equally enthusiastic, authorized him to organize an additional three companies. And so, still a lieutenant, Batson commanded a reinforced battalion of five companies in what Otis intended would be the ultimate campaign of the war—the campaign that would end Aguinaldo's republic and his Army.

General MacArthur had pushed the Philippine Revolutionary Army north of Malolos in the spring but he failed to achieve the decisive victory he had hoped to achieve before the onset of the monsoon season ended active operations. With the monsoon soon to end, Otis planned for MacArthur to make a holding attack along the rail line to fix the Philippine Army in place while Lawton's 1st Division drove north on MacArthur's right flank, trapping the Filipinos on the great central plain by systematically blocking all the passes leading into the mountainous interior of Luzon. Meanwhile, Otis had organized an Expeditionary Brigade under Brig. Gen. Loyd Wheaton to make an amphibious landing from Lingayen Gulf in the Philippine Army's rear.

Batson was in the lead of the Lawton's advance with what was officially styled the "Squadron of Philippine Cavalry, U.S. Volunteers" using "roads in frightful condition." Lawton had nothing but praise for "...the Macabebes, who have distinguished themselves from the moment of their employment, and are now our main reliance and support." On 19 November 1899, Batson and his scouts passed through the town of Tubao and advanced down a long canyon. Entrenched Filipino snipers contested their progress; it took some time for the Macabebes to clear the pass. At dusk they approached a ford on the Aringay River, two miles from the town of Aringay. Some 200 entrenched Filipinos guarded the ford, and "a sharp fight" ensued that lasted about twenty-five minutes The scouts carried the ford—and two hours later the town—but they suffered substantial losses while doing so. Batson was shot in the left foot by a Mauser, but continued to direct his men from horseback. One of the scouts has been wounded as well. Batson directed that the scout use the litter. Although weak from loss of blood, he rode to the dressing station.

A long convalescence followed. While in hospital he heard the news that Lawton was dead—killed in action south of Manila. Eventually, Batson was able to return to duty. He was promoted to major of volunteers but he did not receive the colonelcy and command of a regiment of scouts. The death of Lawton and Otis' return to the United States left no one in a command position in the Philippines who fully understood the role that Batson had played in organizing the scouts.

Batson returned to duty with the scouts in March 1900 and was heavily involved in counter-guerrilla operations—with considerable success—for the next year. The incessant activity these operations required undermined his health. An Army doctor who examined him shortly before he returned to the States thought he was on the verge of a nervous breakdown. He mustered out of the volunteer force when it legally dissolved on June 30, 1901, but by then he had received promotion to captain in the Regular Army. His health did not improve. On 6 February 1902 he retired for "Disability in line of duty from wounds received in action” at the age of thirty-five. He lived another fifteen years. On two occasions the War Department recalled him to active duty for short stints as a recruiter. While on the second of these assignments, he died on January 13, 1917. He was buried at Arlington National Cemetery, in Arlington, Virginia.

The organization he created, now known officially as the Philippine Scouts, continued to grow and eventually included members from other Philippine ethnic groups. By 1903 with the war over the Scouts consisted of multiple regiments with an aggregate strength of 5,000, 40 percent of the total peace-time U.S. Army garrison in the Philippines. By the eve of World War II the Scouts totaled 11,000 men and were organized as infantry, cavalry, and artillery regiments and were noted for their high standards of professionalism.

== Medal of Honor citation ==
Batson's Medal of Honor citation reads:

for most distinguished gallantry in swimming the San Juan River in the face of the enemy's fire and driving him from his entrenchments, near Calamba, Luzon, P. I., while serving as a lieutenant, 4th Cavalry.

== See also ==
- List of Medal of Honor recipients
- List of Philippine–American War Medal of Honor recipients
