= José B. Nísperos =

José Balitón Nísperos
- Born: December 30, 1887; San Fernando, La Union, Captaincy General of the Philippines
- Died: September 1, 1922 (aged 34); San Fernando, La Union, Philippine Islands
- Burial place: Lingsat Cemetery
- Military career
- Allegiance: United States of America
- Branch: Philippine Scouts; United States Army
- Service years: 1907 - 1912
- Rank: Corporal
- Units: 34th Company, Philippine Scouts
- Conflicts: Moro Rebellion; Philippine–American War
- Awards: Medal of Honor
- Other work: Police Officer

José Balitón Nísperos (December 30, 1887 – September 1, 1922) was a member of the Philippine Scouts who received the Medal of Honor during the Moro Rebellion. He was the first Asian to be awarded the medal. On September 24, 1911, at Lapurap, Basilan, Philippines, Nísperos, a member of the U.S. Army's 34th Company of the Philippine Scouts, defended his unit's position against natives armed with spears despite being severely wounded. Nísperos became the first Filipino and Asian to receive the Medal of Honor; the medal was presented by Brigadier General Bell in February 1913.

Nisperos joined the Philippine Scouts in December 1907. Due to wounds suffered in his MOH action, he was discharged at the rank of corporal for disability in June 1912.

== Medal of Honor citation ==
- Nisperos, Jose B.
- Rank and organization: Private, 34th Company, Philippine Scouts.
- Place and date: Lapurap, Basilan, Philippine Islands, September 24, 1911.
- Entered service at: San Fernandos Union, Philippine Islands
- Born: San Fernandos Union, Philippine Islands
- Citation:

Having been badly wounded (his left arm was broken and lacerated and he had received several spear wounds in the body so that he could not stand) continued to fire his rifle with one hand until the enemy was repulsed, thereby aiding materially in preventing the annihilation of his party and the mutilation of their bodies.

== See also ==
- List of Medal of Honor recipients
- List of Asian American Medal of Honor recipients
- List of Philippine–American War Medal of Honor recipients
