= Thomas Sletteland =

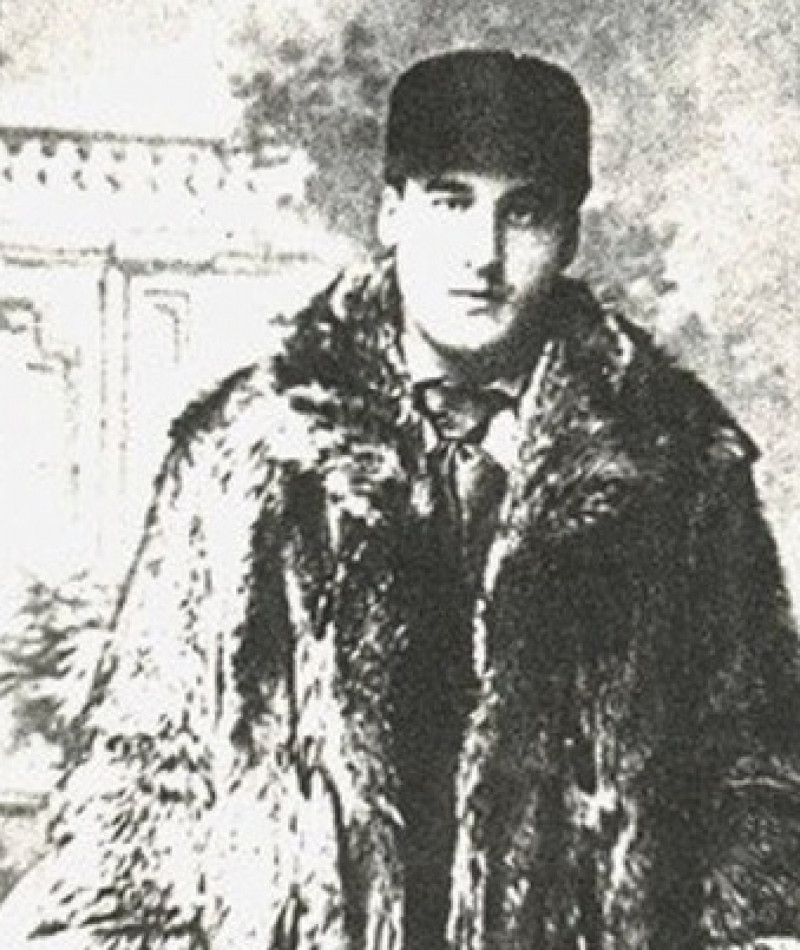
- Thomas Sletteland
- Born: February 18, 1872; Bergen, Norway
- Died: September 1, 1915 (aged 43); Everett, Washington
- Military career
- Allegiance: United States
- Branch: United States Army
- Rank: Private
- Units: Company C, 1st North Dakota Infantry
- Conflicts: Philippine–American War
- Awards: Medal of Honor

Thomas Sletteland was born in Bergen, Norway, on 18 February 1872, and enlisted in the United States Army. Not much is known about his emigration to the US or when he enlisted but we do know that his actions in Luzon during the Philippine–American War, with Company C of the 1st North Dakota Infantry, earned him the Medal of Honor.

== Medal of Honor citation ==
Rank and organization: Private, Company C, 1st North Dakota Infantry
Place and date: Near Paete, Luzon, Philippine Islands, April 12, 1899
Entered service at: Grafton, N. Dak. Birth: Norway
Date of issue: March 11, 1902

Citation:

Single-handed and alone defended his dead and wounded comrades against a greatly superior force of the enemy.

== Post-war ==
Thomas received his Medal of Honor on 11 March 1902, and he died thirteen years later on September 1915 at the age of 43.

== See also ==
- List of Medal of Honor recipients
- List of Philippine–American War Medal of Honor recipients
