= George W. Mathews =

American Soldier

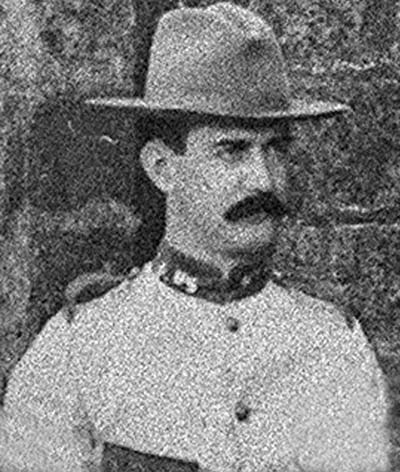
- Born: 1874; Worcester, Massachusetts
- Died: 1906 (aged 31–32)
- Military career
- Allegiance: USA United States of America
- Branch: United States Army
- Service years: 1899 - 1905
- Rank: Major
- Units: 36th Infantry, U.S. Volunteers
- Conflicts: Philippine–American War
- Awards: Medal of Honor

George William Mathews (1874–1906) was an Assistant Surgeon in the United States Army and a Medal of Honor recipient for his actions in the Philippine–American War.

Mathews was assigned to the 36th US Volunteer Infantry as an assistant surgeon (with rank of Captain) in July 1899. He received a promotion to surgeon (with rank of major) in November 1900, and was retired due to disability in February 1905.

== Medal of Honor citation ==
Rank and organization: Assistant Surgeon, 36th Infantry, U.S. Volunteers. Place and date: Near Labo, Luzon, Philippine Islands, October 29, 1899. Entered service at: Worcester, Mass. Birth: Worcester, Mass. Date of issue: March 14, 1902.

Citation:

While in attendance upon the wounded and under a severe fire from the enemy, seized a carbine and beat off an attack upon wounded officers and men under his charge.

== See also ==
- List of Medal of Honor recipients
- List of Philippine–American War Medal of Honor recipients
