= Seth L. Weld =

Seth Lathrop Weld
- Born: February 19, 1879; Sandy Hook, Maryland
- Died: December 20, 1958 (aged 79); San Antonio, Texas, U.S.
- Burial place: Fort Sam Houston National Cemetery, San Antonio, Texas
- Military career
- Allegiance: United States of America
- Branch: United States Army
- Service years: 1899–1933
- Rank: Colonel
- Units: Company L, 8th Infantry Regiment
- Conflicts: Philippine–American War
- Awards: Medal of Honor

Seth Lathrop Weld (February 19, 1879 – December 20, 1958) was a soldier in the United States Army and a Medal of Honor recipient for his actions in the Philippine–American War.

Weld joined the Army from Altamont, Tennessee, in April 1899, and retired with the rank of colonel in September 1933.

== Medal of Honor citation ==
Rank and organization: Corporal, Company L, 8th U.S. Infantry. Place and date: At La Paz, Leyte, Philippine Islands, December 5, 1906. Entered service at: Altamont, Tennessee. Birth: Sandy Hook, Maryland. Date of issue: October 20, 1908.

Citation:

With his right arm cut open with a bolo, went to the assistance of a wounded constabulary officer and a fellow soldier who were surrounded by about 40 Pulajanes, and, using his disabled rifle as a club, beat back the assailants and rescued his party.

== See also ==
- List of Philippine–American War Medal of Honor recipients
