= Arthur M. Ferguson =

US Army officer (1877-1923)

Arthur Medworth Ferguson
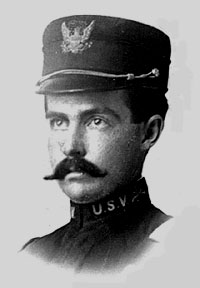
- Colonel Ferguson
- Born: December 11, 1877; Coffey County, Kansas
- Died: February 20, 1923 (aged 45); Fort Leavenworth, Kansas
- Burial place: Arlington National Cemetery
- Military career
- Allegiance: United States of America
- Branch: United States Army
- Service years: 1898–1923
- Rank: Lieutenant Colonel
- Unit: 36th U. S. Volunteer Infantry
- Conflicts: Philippine–American War
- Awards: Medal of Honor; Distinguished Service Cross

Arthur Medworth Ferguson (December 11, 1877 – February 20, 1923) was a United States Army officer who received the Medal of Honor for actions on September 28, 1899, during the Philippine–American War. He later obtained the rank of lieutenant colonel. He had previously been promoted from Corporal after being awarded the Distinguished Service Cross for actions on April 26, 1899. Colonel Ferguson is buried in Arlington National Cemetery.

== Medal of Honor citation ==
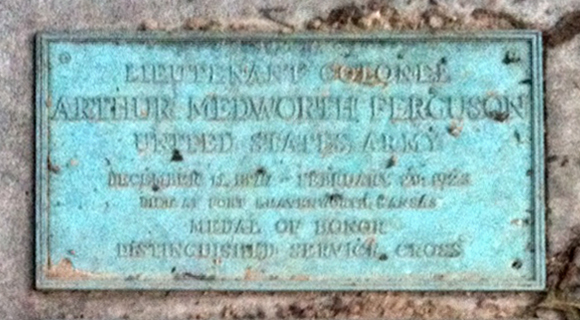

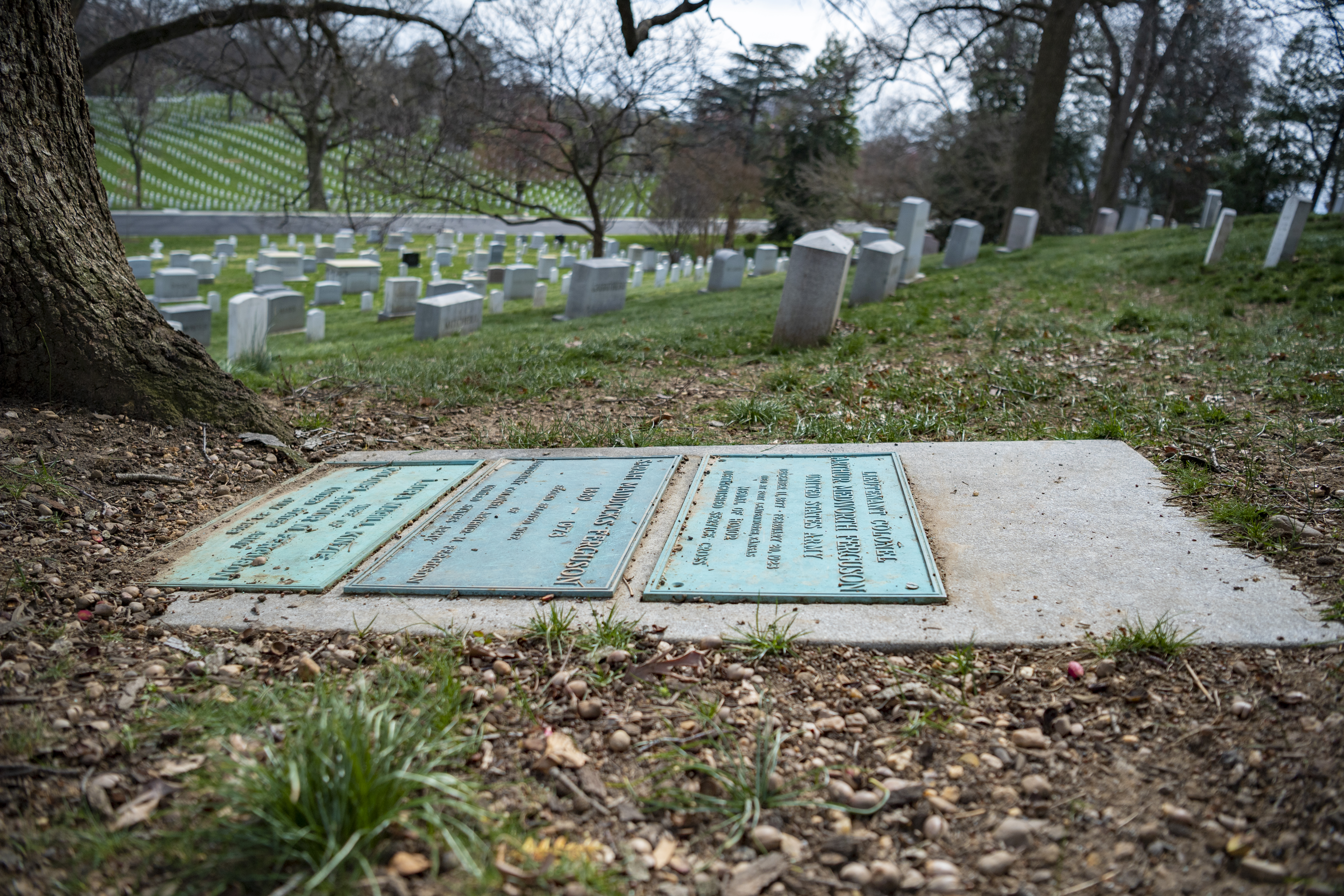
Grave at Arlington National Cemetery

Rank and Organization: First Lieutenant, 36th Infantry, U.S. Volunteers. Place and Date: Near Porac, Luzon, Philippine Islands, September 28, 1899. Entered Service At: Burlington, Kansas Birth: Coffey County, Kans. Date of Issue: March 8, 1902.

Citation:

Charged alone a body of the enemy and captured a captain.

== Distinguished Service Cross citation ==
Corporal, U.S. Army Company E, 20th Kansas Volunteer Infantry General Orders No. 126, W.D., 1919 Home Town: Burlington, Kansas Date of Action: April 26, 1899

Citation:

The Distinguished Service Cross is presented to Arthur M. Ferguson, Corporal, U.S. Army, for extraordinary heroism in action at Calumpit, Philippine Islands, April 26, 1899, against an armed enemy.

At the imminent risk of his life Corporal Ferguson voluntarily crawled through a network of iron beams underneath a bridge and, inch by inch, worked his way hand over hand across the bridge until he was underneath an insurgent's outpost, obtaining a complete description of the condition of the bridge.

== Career ==
- Appointed from Kansas, Corporal and Sergeant, Company E. Kansas Infantry, May 2, 1898, to July 14, 1899.
- First Lieutenant, 36th U.S. Volunteer Infantry, July 5, 1899
- Second Lieutenant, 14th U.S. Infantry, Regular Army
- First Lieutenant, September 24, 1902
- Awarded Medal of Honor on February 7, 1902
- Awarded Distinguished Service Cross 1919

== Other service ==
Colonel Ferguson later served in the Mexican Border Campaign and World War I. When the war broke out in Europe, Ferguson was assigned to Fort Riley, where he became an instructor at the first officers' training camp. He then became Chief Instructor at the second camp at Fort Snelling.

He was then assigned to the War Department as an assistant adjutant general of the U.S. Army, in charge of enlisted men. He received praise from Secretary Newton D. Baker and General Pershing. During the last five years of his service, he served as the Secretary for the General Service Schools, Fort Leavenworth, where he organized the books division, which publishes textbooks for U.S. Army officers.

== Personal life and marriages ==
Ferguson was the son of Captain R.W. Ferguson and he married Laura Magill Ferguson who died in 1913. He remarried, to Sarah Maddocks Ferguson (1889–1973). He is buried next to both of his wives.

== Death ==
Colonel Ferguson died from sudden complications of surgery related to the removal of a hernia. He was survived by his widow, brothers and sisters and his elderly parents.

== See also ==
- List of Medal of Honor recipients
- List of Philippine–American War Medal of Honor recipients
