= Joseph A. Nolan =

American Medal of Honor recipient

Albert Joseph Nolan
- Born: January 20, 1857; Elkhart, Indiana
- Died: August 19, 1921 (aged 64); Niles, Michigan
- Burial place: Niles, Michigan
- Military career
- Allegiance: United States of America
- Branch: United States Army
- Rank: Artificer
- Units: Company B, 45th Infantry, U.S. Volunteers
- Conflicts: Philippine–American War
- Awards: Medal of Honor

Joseph A. Nolan (January 20, 1857–August 19, 1921) was an Artificer in the United States Army and a Medal of Honor recipient for his actions in the Philippine–American War.

== Medal of Honor citation ==
Rank and organization: Artificer, Company B, 45th Infantry, U.S. Volunteers. Place and date: At Labo, Luzon, Philippine Islands, May 29, 1900. Entered service at: South Bend, Ind. Birth: Elkhart, Ind. Date of issue: March 14, 1902.

Citation:

Voluntarily left shelter and at great personal risk passed the enemy's lines and brought relief to besieged comrades.

== See also ==
- List of Medal of Honor recipients
- List of Philippine–American War Medal of Honor recipients
