= Sterling A. Galt =

United States Army Medal of Honor recipient

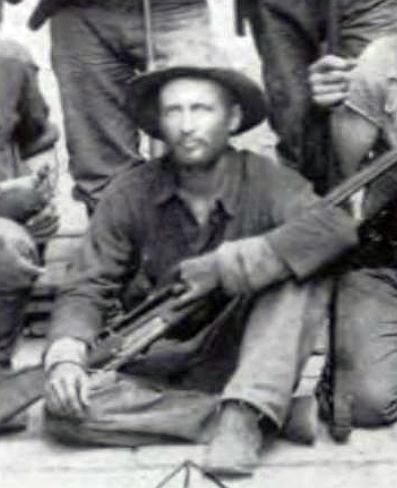
- Born: October 1866; Taneytown, Maryland
- Died: October 21, 1908 (aged 41–42); Kansas City, Missouri, U.S.
- Burial place: Orient Cemetery Harrisonville, Missouri
- Military career
- Allegiance: United States of America
- Branch: United States Army
- Rank: Sergeant Major
- Units: Company F, 36th U.S. Volunteers
- Conflicts: Philippine–American War
- Awards: Medal of Honor

Sterling Archibald Galt (October 1866 – October 21, 1908) was a United States Army Sergeant Major who received the Medal of Honor for actions on November 9, 1899, during the Philippine–American War. He later obtained the rank of sergeant major. Sergeant Major Galt was born in Taneytown, Maryland.

He is buried in Orient Cemetery Harrisonville, Missouri.

== Medal of Honor citation ==
Rank and organization: Artificer, Company F, 36th Infantry, U.S. Volunteers. Place and date: At Bamban, Luzon, Philippine Islands, November 9, 1899. Entered service at: Pawneytown, Md. Birth: Pawneytown, Md. Date of issue: April 30, 1902.

Citation:

Distinguished bravery and conspicuous gallantry in action against insurgents.

== See also ==
- List of Medal of Honor recipients
- List of Philippine–American War Medal of Honor recipients
