= Charles P. Davis =

United States Army soldier

- Born: June 5, 1872; Long Prairie, Minnesota
- Died: May 28, 1943 (aged 70); Valley City, North Dakota
- Burial place: Mandan, North Dakota
- Military career
- Allegiance: United States
- Branch: United States Army National Guard
- Rank: Corporal
- Units: G Company, 1st North Dakota Volunteers
- Conflicts: Philippine Insurrection
- Awards: Medal of Honor

Charles P. Davis (June 5, 1872 – May 28, 1943) was a United States Army soldier who received the Medal of Honor for actions during the Philippine–American War on May 16, 1899, with 29 other members of Young's Scout. He was one of thirteen members of Young's Scouts who were awarded the Medal of Honor between May 13–16, 1899.

Charles Davis is buried in North Dakota Veterans Cemetery, Mandan, North Dakota.

== Medal of Honor citation ==
Rank and organization: Private, Company G, 1st North Dakota Volunteer Infantry. Place and date: Near San Isidro, Philippine Islands, May 16, 1899. Entered service at: Valley City, N. Dak. Birth: Long Prairie, Minn. Date of issue: April 28, 1906.

Citation:

With 21 other scouts charged across a burning bridge, under heavy fire, and completely routed 600 of the enemy who were entrenched in a strongly fortified position.

== See also ==
- List of Medal of Honor recipients
- List of Philippine–American War Medal of Honor recipients
