= Paul F. Straub =

Philippine–American War Medal of Honor recipient

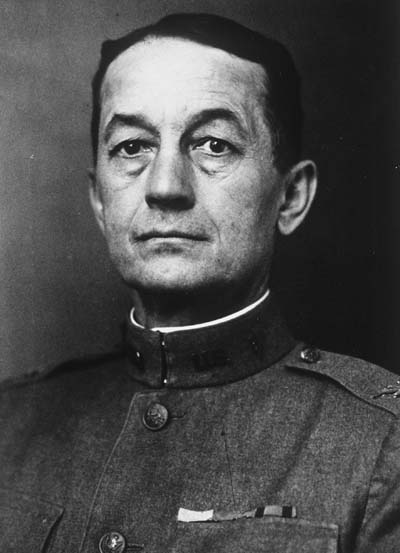
- Paul F. Straub, Medal of Honor recipient
- Born: July 3, 1865; Grand Duchy of Baden
- Died: November 25, 1937 (aged 72); Mount Pleasant, Iowa
- Military career
- Allegiance: United States of America
- Branch: United States Army
- Service years: 1892 – 1919
- Rank: Colonel
- Units: 36th Infantry, U.S. Volunteers; Army Medical Corps
- Conflicts: Philippine–American War; World War I
- Awards: Medal of Honor

Paul Frederick Straub was a Surgeon in the United States Army and a Medal of Honor recipient for his actions in the Philippine–American War.

He also worked in the Office of the Surgeon General; his papers from his time there can be found at the National Library of Medicine.

== Medal of Honor citation ==
Rank and organization: Surgeon. 36th Infantry, U.S. Volunteers. Place and date: At Alos, Zambales, Luzon, Philippine Islands, December 21, 1899. Entered service at: Iowa. Birth: Germany. Date of issue: October 6, 1906.

Citation:

Voluntarily exposed himself to a hot fire from the enemy in repelling with pistol fire an insurgent attack and at great risk of his own life went under fire to the rescue of a wounded officer and carried him to a place of safety.

== See also ==
- List of Medal of Honor recipients
- List of Philippine–American War Medal of Honor recipients
