= William B. Trembley =

- Born: April 21, 1877; Johnson, Kansas
- Died: January 13, 1952 (aged 74); Pharr, Texas, U.S.
- Burial place: Monticello United Methodist Church Union Cemetery, Shawnee, Johnson County, Kansas, USA
- Military career
- Allegiance: United States of America
- Branch: United States Army
- Service years: 1898–1899, 1917–1919
- Rank: First Lieutenant
- Units: Company B, 20th Kansas Volunteer Infantry
- Conflicts: Philippine–American War; World War I
- Awards: Medal of Honor

William Beattie Trembley (April 21, 1877 – January 13, 1952) was a private in the United States Army and a Medal of Honor recipient for his actions in the Philippine–American War. He was later commissioned as a first lieutenant in World War I.

Trembley later served as the postmaster of Kansas City, Kansas, from 1921 to 1935.

== Medal of Honor citation ==
Rank and organization: Private, Company B, 20th Kansas Volunteer Infantry. Place and date: At Calumpit, Luzon, Philippine Islands, 27 April 1899. Entered service at: Kansas City, Kansas. Birth: Johnson, Kansas. Date of issue: 11 March 1902.

Citation:

Swam the Rio Grande de Pampanga in face of the enemy's fire and fastened a rope to the occupied trenches, thereby enabling the crossing of the river and the driving of the enemy from his fortified position.

== See also ==
- List of Medal of Honor recipients
- List of Philippine–American War Medal of Honor recipients
