= William Macleay =

William Macleay may refer to:

- William Sharp Macleay (1792–1865), British/Australian entomologist
- Sir William John Macleay (1820–1891), British/Australian zoologist, cousin of the above

== See also ==
- William Maclay (disambiguation)
