= Ray Charles (disambiguation) =

Ray Charles (1930–2004) was an American singer-songwriter, musician and composer.

Ray Charles may also refer to:

- Ray Charles (album), 1957
- Ray Charles (musician, born 1918) (1918–2015), American musician and leader of The Ray Charles Singers
- "Ray Charles" (song), 2011 single from American rap group Chiddy Bang
- "Ray Charles", a song from La Fouine album Drôle de parcours

== See also ==
- Charles Ray (disambiguation)
