= Charles G. Bickham =

United States Army Medal of Honor recipient

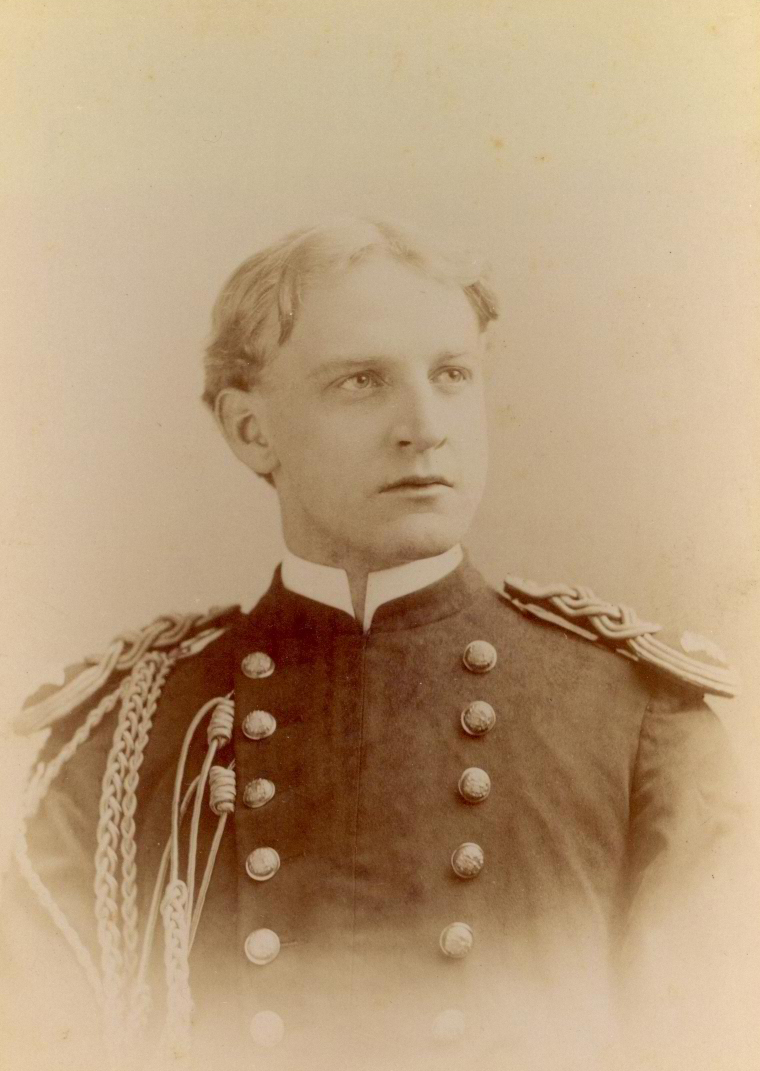
- Born: Charles Goodwin Bickham; August 12, 1867; Dayton, Ohio, US
- Died: December 14, 1944 (aged 77); Dayton, Ohio, US
- Burial place: Woodland Cemetery and Arboretum, Dayton, Ohio
- Military career
- Allegiance: United States
- Branch: United States Army
- Service years: 1898–1910
- Rank: Captain
- Unit: 27th Infantry Regiment
- Conflicts: Philippine–American War
- Awards: Medal of Honor

Charles Goodwin Bickham (August 12, 1867, in Dayton, Ohio – December 14, 1944, in Dayton) was a United States Army first lieutenant who received the Medal of Honor for "distinguished gallantry" on May 2, 1902, in the Battle of Bayang, during the Moro Rebellion. Lieutenant Bickham carried a wounded soldier across a "fire-swept field".

His medal was awarded by Theodore Roosevelt on April 28, 1904.

He served as a colonel on the staff of Ohio Governor William McKinley. During the Spanish–American War, he served as a corporal in Company G, Third Regiment, Ohio National Guard, and later a captain in the Ninth Regiment (Immunes), U.S. Volunteer Infantry. He served as a captain during the Philippine–American War in the Twenty-eighth Regiment, U.S. Volunteer Infantry, under Col. William E. Birkhimer. After receiving his commission in the regular army as a lieutenant, he served again in the Philippines with the Twenty-seventh U.S. Infantry under then-Captain John J. Pershing.

After twice failing the professional examination required for promotion to captain, in 1909 and 1910, he was honorably discharged from the army in June 1910. He never married.

He died December 14, 1944, and is buried in Woodland Cemetery and Arboretum Dayton, Ohio.

== Medal of Honor citation ==
Rank and organization: First Lieutenant, 27th U.S. Infantry. Place and date: At Bayong, near Lake Lanao, Mindanao, Philippine Islands, May 2, 1902. Entered service at: Dayton, Ohio. Birth: Dayton, Ohio. Date of issue: April 28, 1904.

Citation:

Crossed a fire-swept field, in close range of the enemy, and brought a wounded soldier to a place of shelter.

== See also ==
- List of Medal of Honor recipients
- List of Philippine–American War Medal of Honor recipients
