= Louis Gedeon =

- Born: September 19, 1878; Pittsburgh, Pennsylvania
- Died: October 11, 1950 (aged 72); United States Soldiers' and Airmen's Home National Cemetery, Washington, D.C.
- Military career
- Allegiance: United States
- Branch: United States Army
- Rank: Sergeant
- Units: Company G, 19th Infantry Regiment
- Conflicts: Philippine American War
- Awards: Medal of Honor

Louis Gedeon (1878–1950) was a United States Army private who received the Medal of Honor on February 4, 1900. During the Philippine–American War.

Gedeon joined the army from his birthplace in February 1899. He later obtained the rank of sergeant.

In later life, Gedeon lived in the Scott Building at the U.S. Soldiers Home. After his death in Washington, D.C. at the age of 72 in 1950, he was interred at the United States Soldiers' and Airmen's Home National Cemetery.

== Medal of Honor citation ==
Rank and Organization: Private, Company G, 19th U.S. Infantry. Place and Date: At Mount Amia, Cebu, Philippine Islands, February 4, 1900. Entered Service At: Pittsburgh, Pa. Birth: Pittsburgh, Pa. Date of Issue: March 10, 1902.

Citation:

Singlehanded, defended his mortally wounded captain from an overwhelming force of the enemy.

== See also ==
- List of Philippine–American War Medal of Honor recipients

== Note ==
One of the main sources of information about the action was provided by then Corporal Benjamin Foulois, who later became an aviation pioneer and U.S. Army Major General who wrote a letter to Gedeon's Mother.
