= Bernard A. Byrne =

US Army officer and Medal of Honor recipient

Bernard Abert Byrne
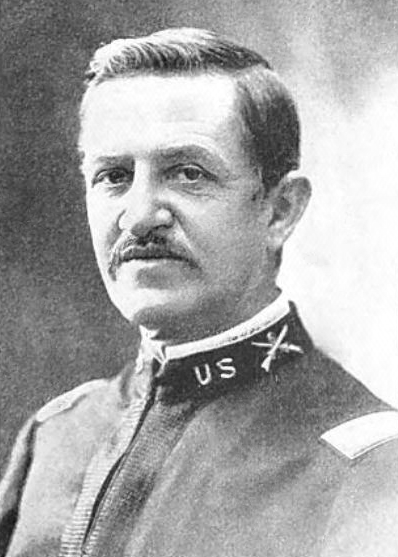
- Born: October 19, 1853; Newport Barracks, Virginia, U.S.
- Died: February 28, 1910 (aged 56); San Francisco, California, U.S.
- Burial place: Arlington National Cemetery
- Military career
- Allegiance: United States
- Branch: United States Army
- Service years: 1875–1906
- Rank: Lieutenant Colonel
- Units: 6th United States Infantry; 40th United States Infantry; 13th United States Infantry
- Conflicts: Philippine–American War
- Awards: Medal of Honor

Bernard Abert Byrne (October 19, 1853 – February 28, 1910) was a United States Army captain who received the Medal of Honor for actions during the Philippine–American War. He later achieved the rank of lieutenant colonel.

== Career ==
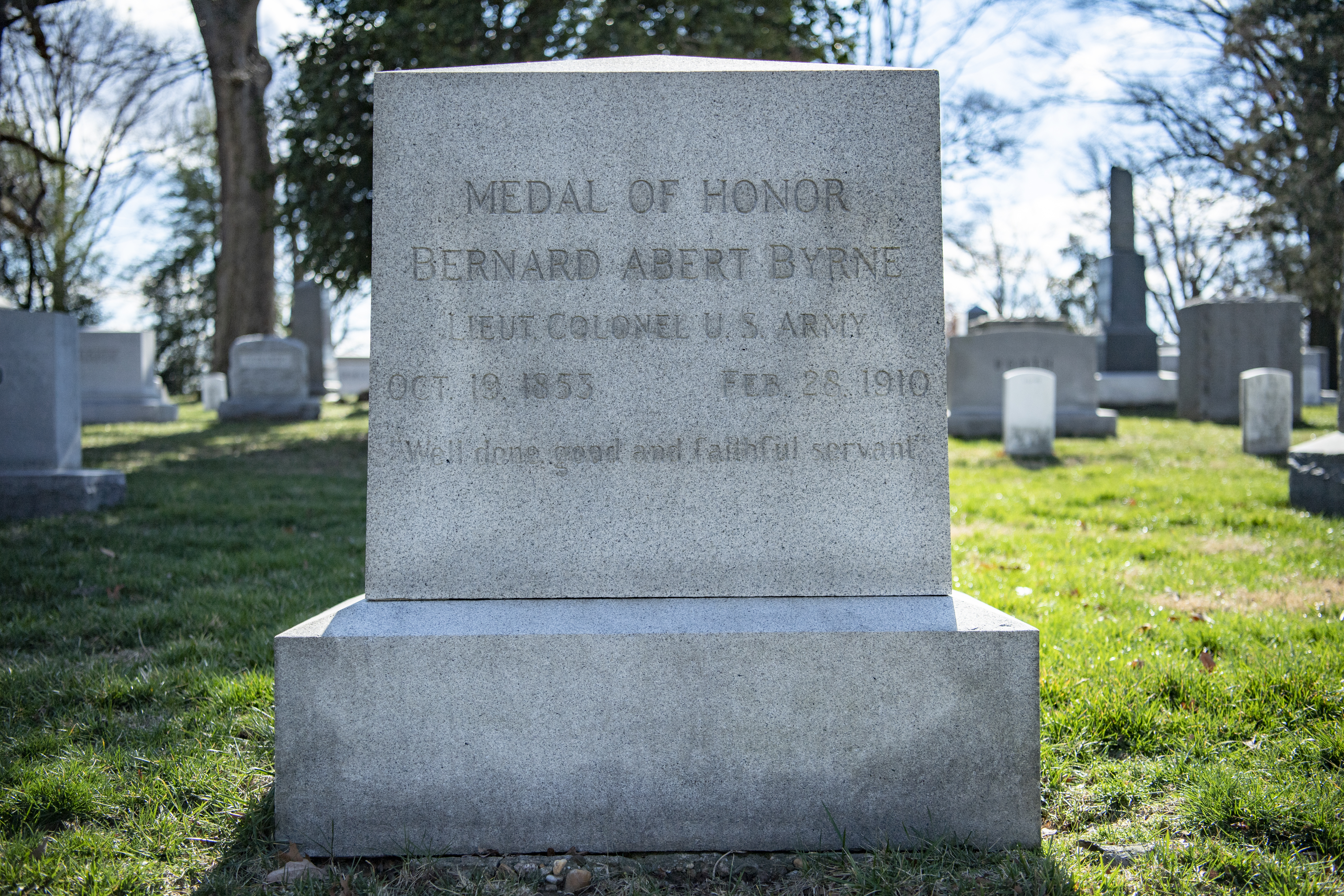
Grave at Arlington National Cemetery

Byrne was born in Newport Barracks, Kentucky, in 1853. His father was Dr. Bernard Miles Byrne, a U.S. Army surgeon. His mother was Louisa Matlack (Abert) Byrne, the daughter of Colonel John James Abert, the first chief of the U.S. Topographical Service.

Byrne joined the army in Washington, D.C. He was educated at Colombian University (later George Washington University). He married Bertha Barnitz, daughter of Albert Trorillo Siders Barnitz, an officer twice brevetted for bravery.

Byrne was a member of the District of Columbia Society of the Sons of the American Revolution.

He died in San Francisco on February 28, 1910, and was buried at Arlington National Cemetery.

== Service history ==
- Appointed from Washington D.C., second lieutenant, 6th United States Infantry – October 15, 1875
- Appointed first lieutenant – December 31, 1882
- Regimental adjutant November 1, 1886 to March 31, 1890
- Appointed captain – November 9, 1894
- Earned Medal of Honor – July 19, 1899
- Appointed lieutenant colonel, 40th US Volunteer Infantry – August 17, 1899
- Honorably mustered out of volunteer service – June 24, 1901
- Appointed major, 13th United States Infantry – February 28, 1901
- Medal of Honor awarded – July 15, 1902
- Retired – July 13, 1906

== Awards ==
- Medal of Honor
- Indian Campaign Medal
- Spanish Campaign Medal
- Army of Cuban Occupation Medal
- Philippine Campaign Medal

=== Medal of Honor citation ===
Rank and Organization: Captain, 6th U.S. Infantry. Place and Date: At Bobong, Negros, Philippine Islands, July 19, 1899. Entered Service At: Washington, D.C. Birth: Newport Barracks, Va. Date of Issue: July 15, 1902.

Citation

Most distinguished gallantry in rallying his men on the bridge after the line had been broken and pushed back.

== See also ==
- List of Medal of Honor recipients
- List of Philippine–American War Medal of Honor recipients
