= William George Thordsen =

US Navy sailor and Medal of Honor recipient (1879–1932)

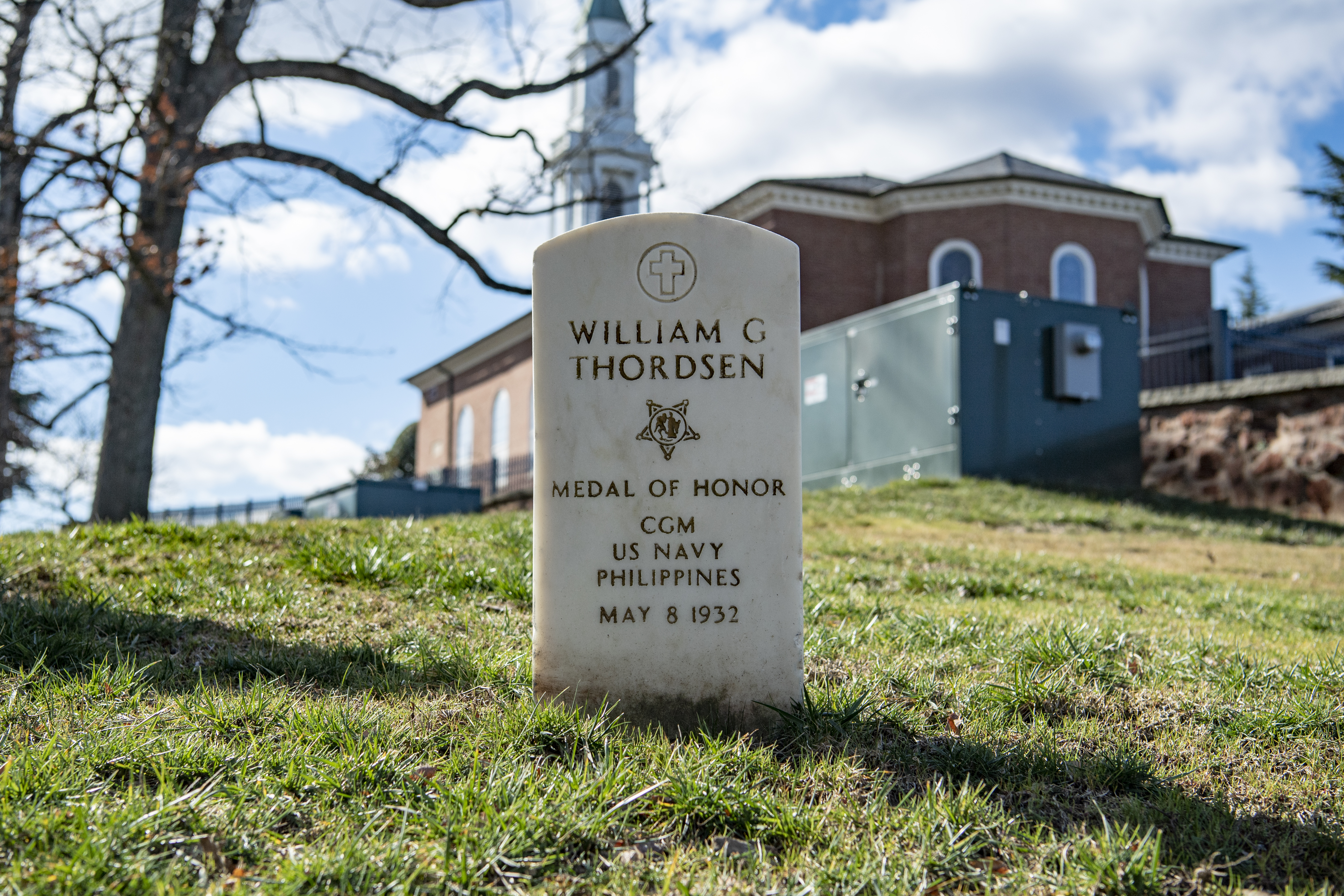
- Grave at Arlington National Cemetery
- Born: April 2, 1879; Fredericstadt, Germany
- Died: May 8, 1932 (aged 53); Manhattan, New York, U.S.
- Burial place: Arlington National Cemetery
- Military career
- Allegiance: United States of America
- Branch: United States Navy
- Service years: 1898–1910
- Rank: Chief Gunner's Mate
- Unit: USS Pampanga
- Conflicts: Philippine–American War
- Awards: Medal of Honor

William George Thordsen (April 2, 1879 – May 8, 1932) was a sailor in the United States Navy and a Medal of Honor recipient for his actions in the Philippine Insurrection, or the Philippine-American War (1899–1902).

Thordsen joined the Navy from New York in 1898, and retired in 1910 at the rank of Chief Gunner's Mate (CGM). He died May 8, 1932, and was buried at Arlington National Cemetery, Section 1, Grave 69-W.

== Medal of Honor citation ==
Rank and organization: Coxswain, U.S. Navy. Born: April 2, 1879, Friedrichstadt, Germany. Accredited to: New York. Date of Issue: August 15, 1900.

Citation:

For heroism and gallantry under fire of the enemy at Hilongos, Philippine Islands, 6 May 1900.

== See also ==
- List of Medal of Honor recipients
- List of Philippine–American War Medal of Honor recipients
