= John E. Moran =

Captain in the United States Army

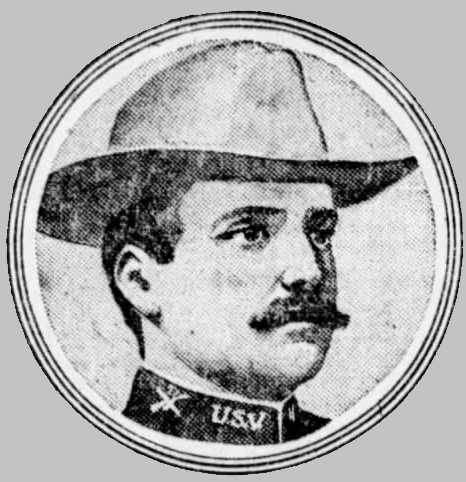
- San Francisco Examiner, February 7, 1901
- Born: August 23, 1856; Vernon, Vermont
- Died: November 7, 1930 (aged 74); Great Falls, Montana
- Burial place: Highland Cemetery; Great Falls, Montana
- Military career
- Allegiance: United States of America
- Branch: United States Army
- Rank: Captain
- Units: Company L, 37th Infantry, U.S. Volunteers
- Conflicts: Philippine–American War
- Awards: Medal of Honor

John E. Moran (August 23, 1856 – November 7, 1930) was a captain in the United States Army and a Medal of Honor recipient for his actions in the Philippine–American War. He lived and is buried in Great Falls, Montana.

== Medal of Honor citation ==
Rank and organization: Captain, Company L, 37th Infantry, U.S. Volunteers. Place and date: Near Mabitac, Laguna, Luzon, Philippine Islands, September 17, 1900. Entered service at: Cascade County, Mont. Born: August 23, 1856, Vernon, Windham County, Vt. Date of issue: June 10, 1910.

Citation:

After the attacking party had become demoralized, fearlessly led a small body of troops under a severe fire and through water waist deep in the attack against the enemy.

== See also ==
- List of Medal of Honor recipients
- List of Philippine–American War Medal of Honor recipients
