= John A. Huntsman =

United States Army Medal of Honor recipient

- Born: March 20, 1867; Oskaloosa, Iowa
- Died: July 10, 1902; Philippine Islands
- Military career
- Allegiance: United States of America
- Branch: United States Army
- Service years: 1898 – 1902
- Rank: Second Lieutenant
- Units: Company E, 36th Infantry, U.S. Army Volunteers
- Conflicts: Philippine–American War
- Awards: Medal of Honor

John A. Huntsman (March 20, 1867 – July 10, 1902) was a United States Army sergeant who received the Medal of Honor for action in 1899 during the Philippine–American War.

== Biography ==
Huntsman spent part of his childhood farming in Oskaloosa, Iowa. He enlisted in the Kansas' National Guard in April 1898. He arrived in Manila during November 1898, serving with the 20th Kansas Volunteer Infantry, which took part in the initial hostilities between Aguinaldo and the U.S. in February 1899.

From April to June 1899, Huntsman served with Major J. Franklin Bell's scouts. Bell, of the 2nd Division, was an engineer but often served as the unit's chief scout. After the unit was relieved from active duty in June, Huntsman joined the 36th Infantry, U.S. Volunteers. The Army had offered a $500 bonus to those re-enlisting from state regiments, and the 36th consisted primarily of those recruited in the Philippines. He eventually reached the rank of second lieutenant.

Huntsman remained in the Philippines as a construction superintendent. Huntsman died from cholera on July 10, 1902.

== Medal of Honor citation ==
Rank and organization: Sergeant, Company E, 36th Infantry, U.S. Volunteers. Place and date: At Bamban, Luzon, Philippine Islands, November 9, 1899. Entered service at: Lawrence, Kans. Birth: Oskaloosa County, Iowa. Date of issue: March 26, 1902.

Citation:

For distinguished bravery and conspicuous gallantry in action against insurgents.

== See also ==
- List of Medal of Honor recipients
