= Charles Cawetzka =

US Army soldier and Medal of Honor recipient

- Born: March 1, 1877; Detroit, Michigan, US
- Died: October 23, 1951 (aged 74); Romulus, Michigan, US
- Burial place: Romulus Memorial Cemetery Romulus, Michigan
- Military career
- Allegiance: United States of America
- Branch: United States Army
- Rank: Corporal
- Units: Company F., 30th Infantry, U. S. Volunteers
- Conflicts: Spanish–American War; Philippine–American War
- Awards: Medal of Honor

Charles Cawetzka (March 1, 1877 Detroit, Michigan – October 23, 1951) was a United States Army soldier who received the Medal of Honor for actions on August 23, 1900, during the Philippine–American War. Private Cawetzka protected a wounded comrade from a "numerically superior enemy". Private Cawetzka is buried in Romulus Memorial Cemetery in Romulus, Michigan.

== Medal of Honor citation ==
Rank and Organization: Private, Company F, 30th Infantry, U.S. Volunteers. Place and Date: Near Sariaya, Luzon, Philippine Islands, August 23, 1900. Entered Service At: Wayne, Mich. Birth: Detroit, Mich. Date of Issue: March 14, 1902.

Citation:

Single-handed, he defended a disabled comrade against a greatly superior force of the enemy.

== See also ==
- List of Medal of Honor recipients
- List of Philippine–American War Medal of Honor recipients
