= Charles H. Pierce =

US Army and Medal of Honor recipient

Charles Henry Pierce
- Born: February 22, 1875; Cecil County, Maryland
- Died: March 2, 1944 (aged 69)
- Military career
- Allegiance: United States of America
- Branch: United States Army
- Rank: Lieutenant
- Units: Company I, 22d U.S. Infantry
- Conflicts: Philippine–American War
- Awards: Medal of Honor

Charles Henry Pierce (February 22, 1875 – March 2, 1944) was a Private in the United States Army and a Medal of Honor recipient for his actions in the Philippine–American War.

He is buried at Valhalla Memorial Park Cemetery in North Hollywood, California.

== Medal of Honor citation ==
Rank and organization: Private, Company I, 22d U.S. Infantry. Place and date: Near San Isidro, Luzon, Philippine Islands, October 19, 1899. Entered service at: Delaware City, Del. Birth: Cecil County, Md. Date of issue: March 10, 1902.

Citation:

Held a bridge against a superior force of the enemy and fought, though severely wounded, until the main body came up to cross.

== See also ==
- List of Medal of Honor recipients
- List of Philippine–American War Medal of Honor recipients
