= James McConnell (Medal of Honor) =

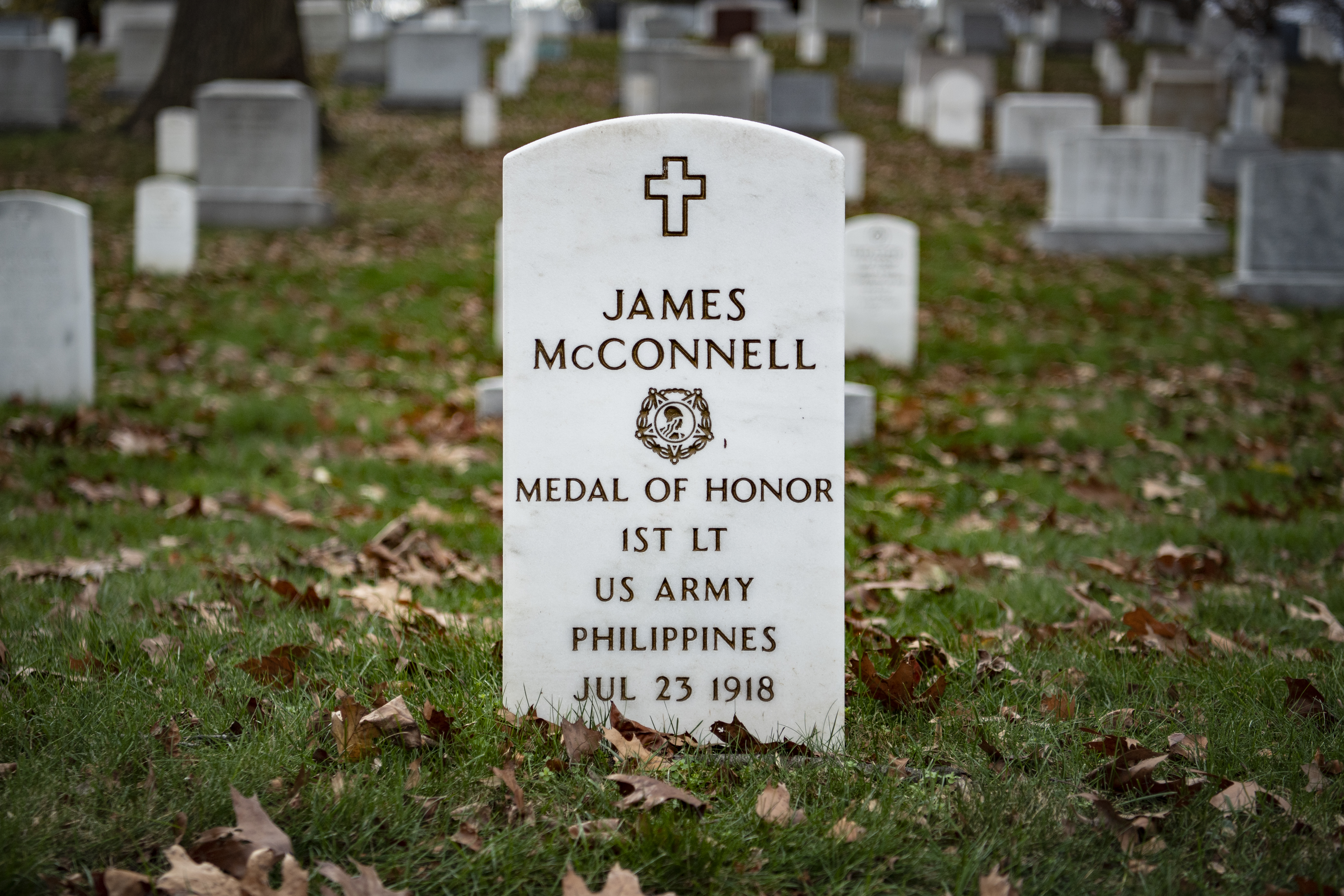
- Grave at Arlington National Cemetery
- Born: 1878; Syracuse, New York, US
- Died: July 23, 1918 (aged 39–40); France
- Burial place: Arlington National Cemetery
- Military career
- Allegiance: United States
- Branch: United States Army
- Rank: First Lieutenant
- Units: Company B, 33d US Volunteer Infantry
- Conflicts: Philippine–American War; World War I
- Awards: Medal of Honor; Distinguished Service Cross

James McConnell was a soldier in the United States Army and a Medal of Honor recipient for his actions in the Philippine–American War.

Almost two decades later, McConnell, by then a First Lieutenant, was also awarded the Distinguished Service Cross for actions in France during World War I. He was mortally wounded and died the same day.

== Medal of Honor citation ==
Rank and organization: Private, Company B, 33d Infantry, U.S. Volunteers. Place and date: At Vigan, Luzon, Philippine Islands, December 4, 1899. Entered service at: Detroit, Mich. Birth: Syracuse, N.Y. Date of issue: October 1, 1902.

Citation:

Fought for hours Iying between 2 dead comrades, notwithstanding his hat was pierced, his clothing plowed through by bullets, and his face cut and bruised by flying gravel.

== See also ==
- List of Medal of Honor recipients
- List of Philippine–American War Medal of Honor recipients
