= George M. Shelton =

American soldier (1877-1949)

- Born: December 23, 1877; Brownwood, Texas
- Died: January 18, 1949 (aged 71); San Francisco, California
- Burial place: San Francisco National Cemetery
- Military career
- Allegiance: United States of America
- Branch: United States Army
- Service years: 1898 - 1921
- Rank: Major
- Unit: 23d Infantry Regiment
- Conflicts: Philippine–American War; World War I
- Awards: Medal of Honor

George Matthew Shelton (December 23, 1877 – January 18, 1949) was a soldier in the United States Army and a Medal of Honor recipient for his actions in the Philippine–American War.

Shelton joined the Army from Billington, Texas in May 1898, and retired with the rank of Major in September 1921.

== Medal of Honor citation ==
Rank and organization: Private, Company I, 23d U.S. Infantry. Place and date: At La Paz, Leyte, Philippine Islands, April 26, 1900. Entered service at: Billington, Tex. Birth: Brownwood, Tex. Date of issue: March 10, 1902.

Citation:

Advanced alone under heavy fire of the enemy and rescued a wounded comrade.

== See also ==
- List of Medal of Honor recipients
- List of Philippine–American War Medal of Honor recipients
