= Joseph Fitz =

Jahosephitz
- Born: May 24, 1886; Austro-Hungarian Empire
- Died: February 24, 1945 (aged 58); Des Moines, Iowa, U.S.
- Military career
- Allegiance: United States of America
- Branch: United States Navy
- Service years: 1900–1910
- Rank: Seaman
- Unit: USS Pampanga (PG-39)
- Conflicts: Philippine–American War
- Awards: Medal of Honor

Joseph Fitz (May 24, 1886 – February 24, 1945) was a United States Navy Ordinary Seaman who received the Medal of Honor for actions on March 8, 1906, during the Philippine–American War. He served in the navy from 1900 to 1910, and later obtained the rank of seaman.

== Biography ==
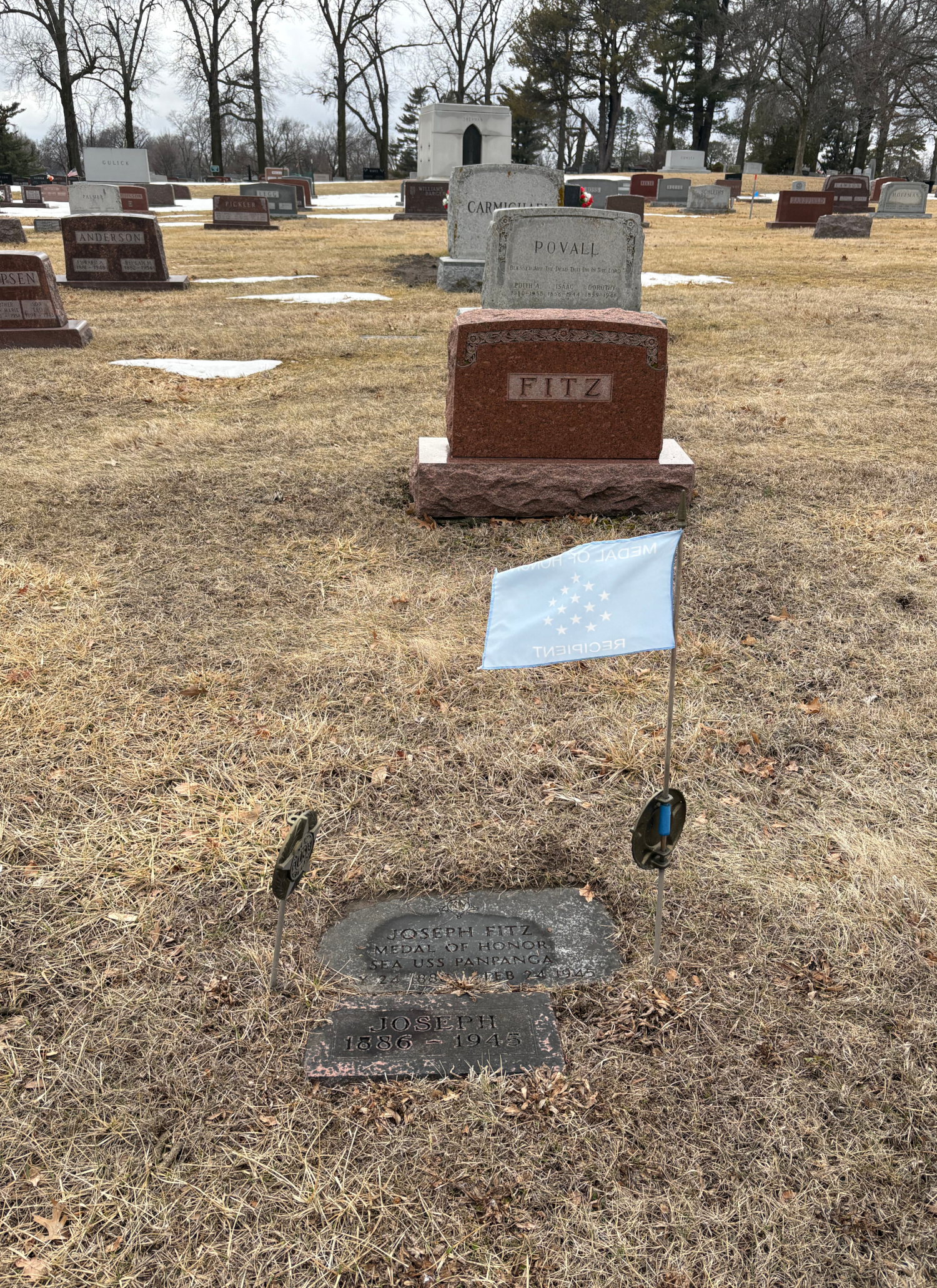
Fitz's grave at Glendale Cemetery

Joseph Fitz was born in the Austro-Hungarian Empire on May 24, 1886.

He died at his home in Des Moines, Iowa on February 24, 1945, and was buried at Glendale Cemetery.

== Medal of Honor citation ==
Rank and Organization: Ordinary Seaman, U.S. Navy. Born: May 24, 1886, Austria. Accredited to: Iowa. G.O. No.: 19, May 1, 1906.

Citation:

On board the USS Pampanga (PG-39), Mount Dajo Jolo, Philippine Islands, 8 March 1906. Serving in the presence of the enemy on this date, Fitz displayed bravery and extraordinary heroism.

== See also ==
- List of Medal of Honor recipients
- List of Philippine–American War Medal of Honor recipients
