= Joseph L. Epps =

- Born: May 16, 1870; Jamestown, Missouri
- Died: June 20, 1952 (aged 82); Oklahoma
- Military career
- Allegiance: United States of America
- Branch: United States Army
- Service years: 42
- Rank: Private
- Units: Company B, 33rd U. S. Volunteer Infantry
- Conflicts: Philippine–American War
- Awards: Medal of Honor

Joseph L. Epps (May 16, 1870 – June 20, 1952) was a United States Army private who received the Medal of Honor for his actions on December 4, 1899, during the Philippine–American War.

Epps is buried at Greenhill Cemetery in Muskogee, Oklahoma.

== Medal of Honor citation ==
Rank and Organization: Private, Company B, 33d Infantry, U.S. Volunteers. Place and Date: At Vigan, Luzon, Philippine Islands, December 4, 1899. Entered Service At: Oklahoma Indian Territory. Birth: Jamestown, Mo. Date of Issue: February 7, 1902.

Citation:

Discovered a party of insurgents inside a wall, climbed to the top of the wall, covered them with his gun, and forced them to stack arms and surrender.

== See also ==
- List of Medal of Honor recipients
- List of Philippine–American War Medal of Honor recipients
