= Amos Weaver =

- Born: June 13, 1869; Niles Township, Delaware County, Indiana
- Died: November 12, 1937
- Military career
- Allegiance: United States of America
- Branch: United States Army
- Rank: Sergeant
- Units: Company F, 36th Infantry, U.S. Volunteers
- Conflicts: Philippine–American War
- Awards: Medal of Honor

Amos Weaver was a sergeant in the United States Army and a Medal of Honor recipient for his actions in the Philippine–American War.

== Medal of Honor citation ==
Rank and organization: Sergeant, Company F, 36th Infantry, U.S. Volunteers. Place and date: Between Calubus and Malalong, Philippine Islands, November 5, 1899. Entered service at: San Francisco, Calif. Born: June 13, 1869, Niles Township, Delaware County, Ind. Date of issue: March 15, 1902.

Citation:

Alone and unaided, charged a body of 15 insurgents, dislodging them, killing 4 and wounding several.

== See also ==
- List of Medal of Honor recipients
- List of Philippine–American War Medal of Honor recipients
