= Anthony J. Carson =

- Born: April 23, 1869; Boston, Massachusetts, US
- Died: April 25, 1943 (aged 74); Boston, Massachusetts, US
- Burial place: Mattapan, Massachusetts
- Military career
- Allegiance: United States of America
- Branch: United States Army
- Service years: 1899 - 1901
- Rank: Sergeant
- Units: H Company, 43rd U. S. Volunteer Infantry
- Conflicts: Philippine–American War
- Awards: Medal of Honor

Anthony J. Carson (April 23, 1869 – April 25, 1943) was a United States Army Corporal who received the Medal of Honor for actions during the Philippine–American War. Carson was awarded the Medal on January 4, 1906, for actions on April 15–19, 1900. His medal was awarded by President Theodore Roosevelt. Carson would later admit that the battle was a defeat.

== Medal of Honor citation ==
Rank and Organization: Corporal, Company H, 43d Infantry, U.S. Volunteers. Place and Date: At Catubig, Samar, Philippine Islands, April 15–19, 1900. Entered Service At: Malden, Mass. Birth: Boston, Mass. Date of Issue: January 4, 1906.

Citation:

Assumed command of a detachment of the company which had survived an overwhelming attack of the enemy, and by his bravery and untiring efforts and the exercise of extraordinary good judgment in the handling of his men successfully withstood for 2 days the attacks of a large force of the enemy, thereby saving the lives of the survivors and protecting the wounded until relief came.

== See also ==
- List of Medal of Honor recipients
- List of Philippine–American War Medal of Honor recipients
