= Frank Walker (lumberman) =

American lumberman and politician

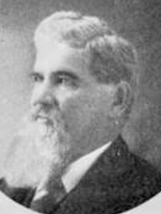
Walker in 1902.

Frank Walker (March 29, 1843 – August 26, 1916) was a lumberman, a contractor, a builder, a city official and an inventor in the Pacific Coast of the United States and British Columbia at the turn of the 19th and 20th centuries.

== Personal ==
Walker was born on March 29, 1843, in Ancaster, Ontario, or in Kincardine, Ontario, the son of Canadians Francis Walker and Elizabeth Hudson.

Walker was married twice: His first wife, Delia, died at their home, 129 South Olive Street, on September 28, 1891. He married again, to Sarah Gibson of Texas, who died on October 1, 1910. He had one child, Frank Harvey.

Walker died at home on August 26, 1916.

== Vocation ==
At age 21 Walker moved to Eureka, California, where was in lumbering, and later he was a miner in British Columbia, Idaho and Nevada. He began building and contracting in San Francisco about 1870, specializing in mills for mining companies in both the United States and Mexico. He then moved to Santa Barbara, "where he erected some of the first brick blocks in that town." He also erected the Odd Fellows Hall there, as well as the Sterns Building and private residences. He built the first street railway in Santa Barbara, running from the wharf to the Arlington Hotel. After relocating to Los Angeles in 1897, Walker built the first street railroad in Pasadena and "had the first large contract of paving in Los Angeles. He also worked on a street railway in Los Angeles. He built the courthouse and the waterworks in Tombstone, Arizona.

He was an inventor, and he patented several devices, including a solar heater, which was "used extensively in Southern California."

== Social activities and politics ==
Walker was a member of the Elks Lodge, the Pioneers of Los Angeles, the Masonic Lodge and the Jonathan Club. He was a Presbyterian, and in politics he was a Republican until 1895 and then became a Democrat, running unsuccessfully for city assessor in 1898. He was elected as a Democrat to the Los Angeles City Council in 1900. He served one term. During that time, he "is said to have been instrumental in preventing the Street Railway Corporation from getting the celebrated freight-carrying franchise, which would have allowed freight cars to run on some of the principal streets of the city."

Walker declined to run for reelection to the council but instead announced himself as a Democratic candidate for mayor in 1902; he withdrew from that race in favor of Le Grand Parker. Meredith P. Snyder was nominated and was elected.
