= Hugh J. McGrath =

US Army captain (1858–1899)

Hugh Jocelyn McGrath
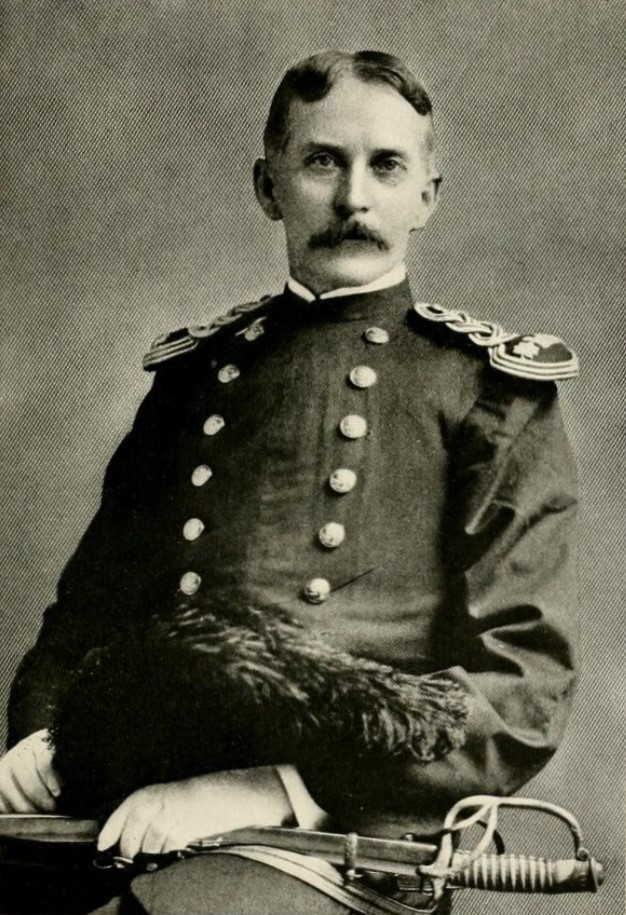
- Born: April 8, 1856; Fond du Lac, Wisconsin, US
- Died: November 7, 1899 (aged 43); Manila, Philippines
- Military career
- Allegiance: United States of America
- Branch: United States Army
- Service years: 1880–1899
- Rank: Major (USV); Captain (USA)
- Unit: 4th Cavalry Regiment
- Conflicts: Philippine–American War
- Awards: Medal of Honor

Hugh Jocelyn McGrath (April 8, 1856 – November 7, 1899) was a captain in the United States Army and a Medal of Honor recipient for his actions in the Philippine–American War.

McGrath was born in Fond du Lac, Wisconsin on April 8, 1856. He lived in Eau Claire, Wisconsin. McGrath graduated from Eau Claire High School in 1873 and then taught school for a while before enrolling in the scientific course at the University of Wisconsin. After completing the first two years of the program, he left to attend the United States Military Academy, graduating in June 1880. McGrath was commissioned as a cavalry officer and assigned to frontier duty with the 4th Cavalry Regiment. He entered the Infantry and Cavalry School at Fort Leavenworth, Kansas in September 1885 and graduated in July 1887.

After more frontier duty, McGrath served as professor of military science and tactics at the University of Wisconsin from September 1891 to September 1894. While there, he earned an LL.B. degree from the law school in 1893 and was admitted to the Wisconsin bar that same year. McGrath was promoted to captain in June 1897 and then received a temporary promotion to major of U.S. Volunteers in June 1898 during the Spanish–American War. He did not see action, but later served in Havana, Cuba from November 1898 to April 1899. He was returned to the rank of captain in May 1899 before being sent to rejoin the 4th Cavalry in the Philippines.

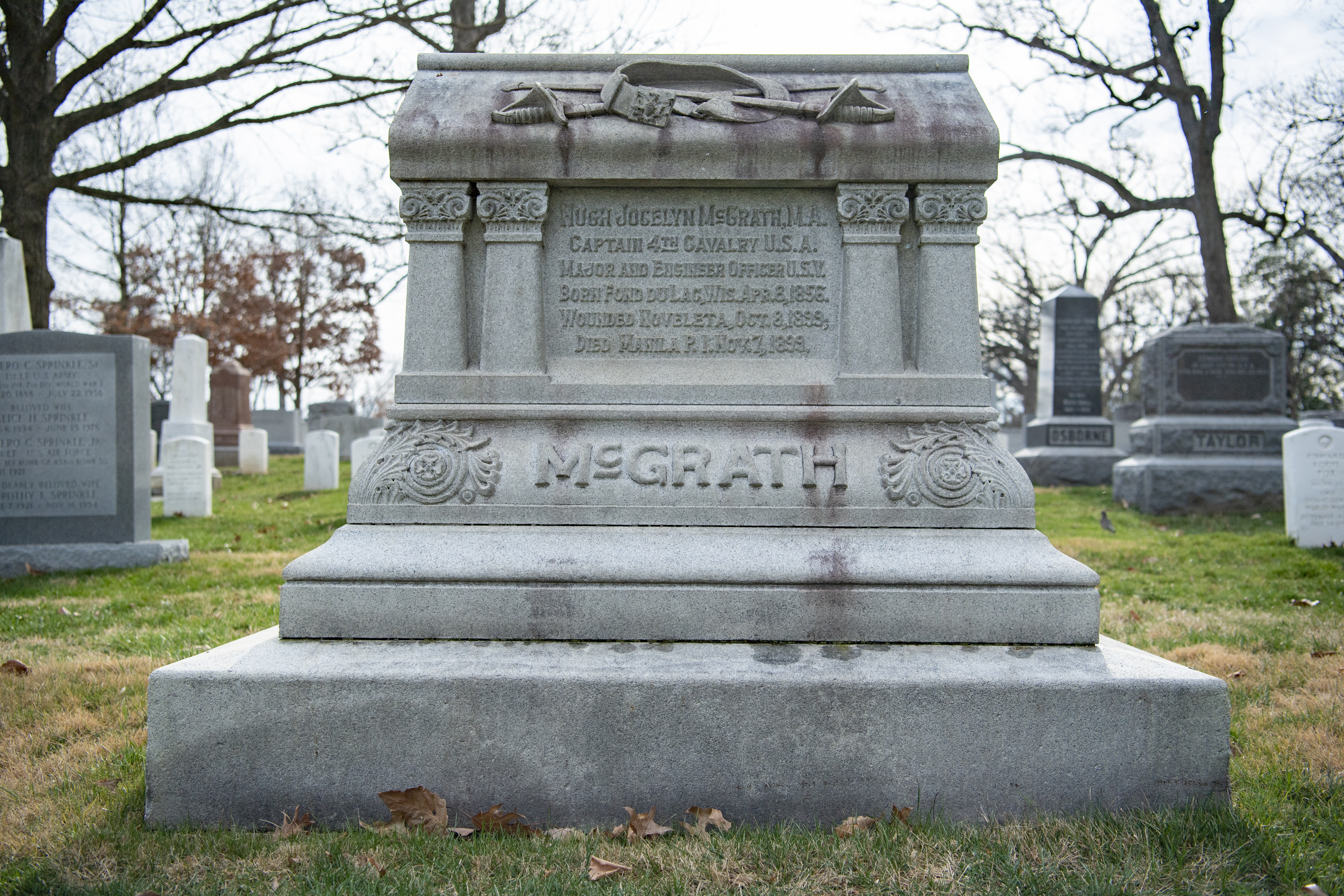
Grave at Arlington National Cemetery

McGrath was wounded in the left thigh at Noveleta in October 1899, and he died of his wound a month later. His body was repatriated in December 1899 and he was buried at Arlington National Cemetery.

== Medal of Honor citation ==
Rank and organization: Captain, 4th U.S. Cavalry. Place and date: At Calamba, Luzon, Philippine Islands, July 26, 1899. Entered service at: Eau Claire, Wis. Birth: Fond du Lac, Wis. Date of issue: April 29, 1902.

Citation:

Swam the San Juan River in the face of the enemy's fire and drove him from his entrenchments.

== Legacy ==
McGrath Hall at Fort Leavenworth is named in his honor. Originally built as an infantry barracks, it currently provides officer housing.

== See also ==
- List of Medal of Honor recipients
- List of Philippine–American War Medal of Honor recipients
