= Frank Walker (musicologist) =

Frank Walker (June 10, 1907, Gosport – February 25, 1962, Tring) was an English musicologist and biographer. He was an authority on the composer Hugo Wolf and his book Hugo Wolf: A Biography was published by J. M. Dent in 1951. It was later re-published by Alfred A. Knopf in 1968 and Princeton University Press in 1992. Walker also wrote a biography on Giuseppe Verdi, The Man Verdi, which was published by Alfred A. Knopf in 1962; the year that Walker died of suicide. Walker also contributed essays and other scholarly works to various periodicals, including Music & Letters, The Monthly Musical Record, Proceedings of the Royal Musical Association, Musical Quarterly, and The Musical Times. Many of his publications focused on Neapolitan music and aspects of early Italian music.
