= William P. Maclay (Medal of Honor) =

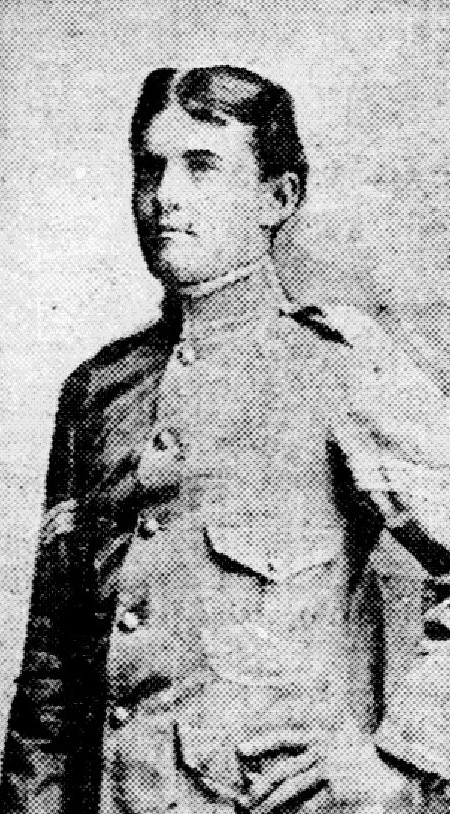
- Newspaper portrait of William P. Maclay from a 28 Aug 1908 Philadelphia, PA The Philadelphia Inquirer newspaper, page 7
- Born: March 18, 1877; Spruce Creek, Pennsylvania, US
- Died: July 31, 1943 (aged 65–66); Naval Hospital Philadelphia
- Burial place: Arlington National Cemetery
- Military career
- Allegiance: United States of America
- Branch: United States Army
- Rank: First Lieutenant
- Units: Company A, 43d Infantry, U.S. Volunteers
- Conflicts: World War I, Philippine–American War
- Awards: Medal of Honor

William Palmer Maclay (1877–July 31, 1943) was a United States Army private received the Medal of Honor for actions during the Philippine–American War

He is buried in Arlington National Cemetery, Arlington, Virginia. His grave can be found in section 7, Lot 9008-F.

== World War I ==
In 1917, Maclay was drafted to World War I. He served in the will up until the Armistice of 11 November 1918.

== Medal of Honor citation ==
Rank and organization: Private, Company A, 43d Infantry, U.S. Volunteers. Place and date: At Hilongas, Leyte, Philippine Islands, May 6, 1900. Entered service at: Altoona, Pa. Birth: Spruce Creek, Pa. Date of issue: March 11, 1902.

Citation:

Charged an occupied bastion, saving the life of an officer in a hand-to-hand combat and destroying the enemy.

== Personal information ==
Maclay lived in Philadelphia with his wife, Daisy. He was of an average build, with dark brown hair and blue eyes.

== See also ==
- List of Philippine–American War Medal of Honor recipients
