= James R. Gillenwater =

James Gillenwater
- Born: October 28, 1871; Rye Cove, Virginia
- Died: January 19, 1946 (aged 74); Rogersville, Tennessee, U.S.
- Burial place: Highland Cemetery Rogersville, Tennessee
- Military career
- Allegiance: United States of America
- Branch: United States Army
- Rank: Corporal
- Units: Company A, 36th Infantry
- Awards: Medal of Honor

James Robert Gillenwater (October 28, 1871 – January 19, 1946) was a Corporal with Company A, 36th Infantry, United States Volunteers when he received the Medal of Honor for actions near Porac, Luzon, Philippine Islands, September 3, 1899. Date of issue: March 1, 1902. He was born and entered service at Rye Cove, Virginia.

He died January 19, 1946. He was first buried at Payne Cemetery and later moved to Highland Cemetery in Rogersville, Tennessee.

== Medal of Honor citation ==
Rank and organization: Corporal, Company A, 36th Infantry, U.S. Volunteers. Place and date: Near Porac, Luzon, Philippine Islands, September 3, 1899. Entered service at: Rye Cove, Va. Birth: Rye Cove Va. Date of issue: March 1, 1902.

Citation:

While on a scout drove off a superior force of insurgents and with the assistance of 1 comrade brought from the field of action the bodies of 2 comrades, 1 killed and the other severely wounded.

== See also ==
- List of Medal of Honor recipients
- List of Philippine–American War Medal of Honor recipients
