= Charles W. Ray =

- Born: August 6, 1872; Pensacola, Yancey County, North Carolina
- Died: March 23, 1959 (aged 86); Grandfield, Oklahoma, U.S.
- Military career
- Allegiance: United States of America
- Branch: United States Army
- Service years: 1898 - 1900
- Rank: Sergeant
- Units: Company I, 22d U.S. Infantry
- Conflicts: Philippine–American War
- Awards: Medal of Honor

Charles W. Ray (August 6, 1872 - March 23, 1959) was a sergeant in the United States Army and a Medal of Honor recipient for his actions in the Philippine–American War.

== Medal of Honor citation ==
Rank and organization: Sergeant, Company I, 22d U.S. Infantry. Place and date: Near San Isidro, Luzon, Philippine Islands, 19 October 1899. Entered service at: St. Louis, Mo. Birth: Pensacola Yancey County, N.C. Date of issue: 18 April 1902.

Citation:

Most distinguished gallantry in action. Captured a bridge with the detachment he commanded and held it against a superior force of the enemy, thereby enabling an army to come up and cross.

== See also ==
- List of Medal of Honor recipients
- List of Philippine–American War Medal of Honor recipients
