= Frank T.O. Walker =

- Born: October 6, 1878; South Boston, Massachusetts
- Died: October 29, 1904 (aged 26)
- Burial place: Bristol, Rhode Island
- Military career
- Allegiance: United States of America
- Branch: United States Army
- Rank: Private
- Units: Company F, 46th Infantry, U.S. Volunteers
- Conflicts: Philippine–American War
- Awards: Medal of Honor

Frank T.O. Walker (October 6, 1878 – October 29, 1904) was a private in the United States Army and a Medal of Honor recipient for his actions in the Philippine–American War.

== Medal of Honor citation ==
Rank and organization. Private, Company F, 46th Infantry, U.S. Volunteers. Place and date: Near Taal, Luzon, Philippine Islands, January 18, 1900. Entered service at: Burlington, Mass. Birth: South Boston, Mass. Date of issue: March 11, 1902.

Citation:

Under heavy fire of the enemy he rescued a dying comrade who was sinking beneath the water.

== See also ==
- List of Philippine–American War Medal of Honor recipients
