= Francis Walker =

Francis Walker may refer to:

- Francis Walker (Virginia politician) (1764–1806), U.S. congressman from Virginia
- Francis Walker (entomologist) (1809–1874), British entomologist
- Francis A. Walker (politician) (1871–1956), Canadian politician in Alberta
- Francis Amasa Walker (1840–1897), American economist
- Francis S. Walker (1848–1916), Irish painter
- Francis Marion Walker (1827–1864), Confederate States Army colonel during the American Civil War
- Francis Spring Walker (1876–1941), British Army officer

== See also ==
- Frank Walker (disambiguation)
- Frances Walker (disambiguation)
