= Frank L. Anders =

Frank LaFayette Anders
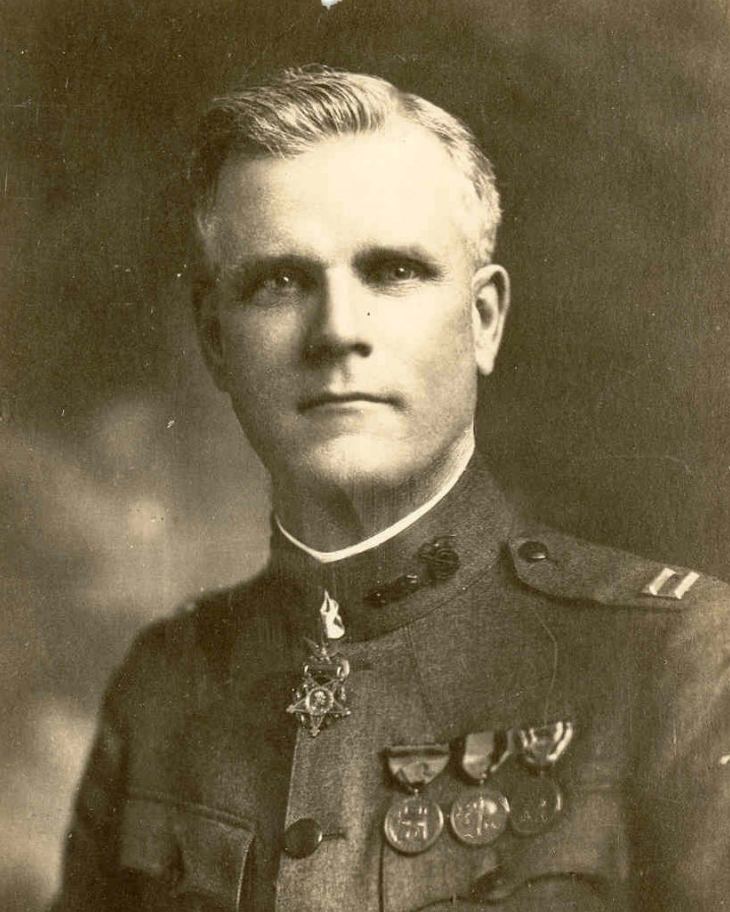
- Frank Lafayette Anders
- Born: November 10, 1875; Fort Abraham Lincoln, Dakota Territory, U.S.
- Died: January 23, 1966 (aged 90); Ripon, Wisconsin, U.S.
- Military career
- Allegiance: United States of America
- Branch: United States Army
- Service years: 1894 - 1899, 1918 - 1920
- Rank: Major
- Units: Young's Scouts; 1st North Dakota Volunteer Infantry
- Conflicts: Philippine–American War
- Awards: Medal of Honor; McKinley Congressional Medal
- Other work: Businessman; Historian; Scottish Rite; Mason; Geologist; Engineer

Frank LaFayette Anders (November 10, 1875 – January 23, 1966) was a United States Army soldier who received the congressional Medal of Honor for actions during the Philippine–American War (a.k.a. Filipino Insurrection), 1899-1902. He went on to become a noteworthy engineer, businessman, amateur military historian and politician.

== Early years ==
Anders was born in Fort Abraham Lincoln, then in the Dakota Territory (1861-1889), in what is now Fort Abraham Lincoln State Park, North Dakota. His father, formerly a United States Army / Union Army soldier in the American Civil War (1861-1865), who died of complications a quarter-century later related to his wounds in 1890, and young Anders, at age 15 began work with the transcontinental railroad line of the Northern Pacific Railroad and became a machinist.

== Active service and war years ==
In 1894 Anders enlisted in the U.S. National Guard of North Dakota, serving at home for six years and after starting his second enlistment period, was deployed to the Philippines chain of islands in the western Pacific Ocean, off the coast of Asia. These were the former Royal colony since the 16th century of the Kingdom of Spain, as the Spanish East Indies / Philippine Islands in the Spanish Empire. They had been occupied by the United States military since their naval victory at the Battle of Manila Bay in Manila Bay in the Spanish-American War of April–December 1898. Although Filipino rebels has already proclaimed their independent Philippine Republic, instead a long grueling jungle guerrilla war and insurgency ensued 1899-1902.

== Medal and citation ==
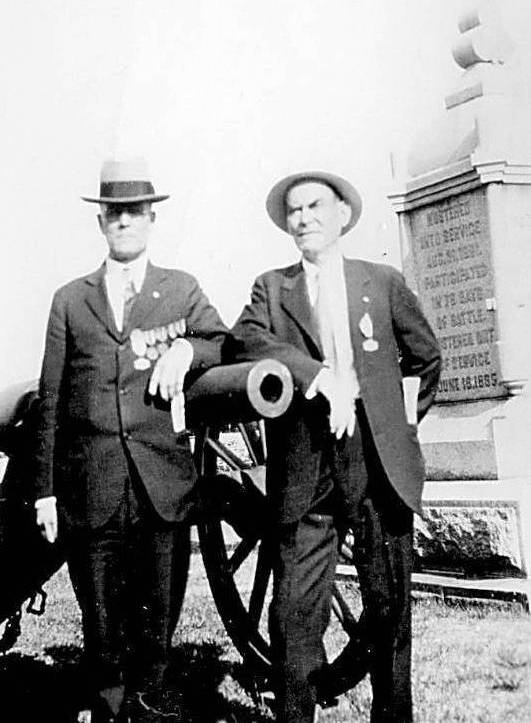
Anders (left) and Peter H. Quinn (right) at Gettysburg

On May 13, 1899, Anders was one of 11 men later awarded the medal for actions which took place against the Philippine rebels / freedom fighters for the independence of their declared Philippine Republic. These men, part of Young's Scouts, caused 300 members of the enemy to retreat before their sudden charge. Anders' medal was officially awarded on March 3, 1906. Citation:

With 11 other scouts, without waiting for the supporting battalion to aid them or to get into a position to do so, charged over a distance of about 150 yards (140 m) and completely routed about 300 of the enemy who were in line and in a position that could only be carried by a frontal attack.

== Post-war service and death ==
After returning home back east across the Pacific Ocean to the United States in 1899, he worked for several mining interests and in 1902, armed with only a seventh grade education and a few months at the Dakota Business College (1895), he decided to attend Ripon College in Ripon, Wisconsin, and after graduation in 1906 he became the first person awarded a scholarship by the University of Wisconsin at Madison where he studied Civil Engineering and was initiated into the Acacia Fraternity in 1907, and was subsequently employed chief engineer with the Utah Smelting Corporation for a decade from 1909 until 1920.

During the First World War (1914/1917-1918) era, in 1918, he returned to the American military and was commissioned a captain in the United States Army and their U.S. Army Corps of Engineers and subsequently stationed in Fort Dodge, Iowa. The following year of 1919, he was transferred to Fort Riley in Kansas, where he was in charge of hospitals and also served in the federal national capital city of Washington, D.C., and later at the famous Henry Ford Hospital in the New Center section of Detroit, Michigan. He eventually reached the military rank of Major.

Major Anders died in 1966, and was the oldest surviving recipient of the congressional Medal of Honor at the time of his death.

== Marriage and personal life ==
In 1910, Anders married Mary Bertha Hargrave and had two children, Franklin and Marion.

== See also ==
- List of Medal of Honor recipients
- List of Philippine–American War Medal of Honor recipients
