= Frank F. Ross =

Frank Fulton Ross
- Born: December 2, 1867; Avon, Illinois, US
- Died: January 29, 1936 (aged 68); Ontario, California, US
- Military career
- Allegiance: United States of America
- Branch: United States Army
- Rank: Captain
- Units: Young's Scouts, 1st North Dakota Volunteer Infantry
- Conflicts: Philippine–American War
- Awards: Medal of Honor

Frank Fulton Ross (December 2, 1867 – January 29, 1936) was a United States Army soldier received the Medal of Honor for actions on May 16, 1899, during the Philippine–American War. He was part of Young's Scouts and won the Medal along with 16 fellow Scouts.

He was the son of American Civil War General Leonard Fulton Ross.

== Medal of Honor citation ==
Rank and Organization: Private, Company H, 1st North Dakota Volunteer Infantry. Place and Date: Near San Isidro, Philippine Islands May 16, 1899. Entered Service At: Langdon, N. Dak. Birth: Avon, Avon, Ill. Date of Issue: June 6, 1906.

Citation:

With 21 other scouts charged across a burning bridge, under heavy fire, and completely routed 600 of the enemy who were entrenched in a strongly fortified position.

== See also ==
- List of Medal of Honor recipients
