= Edward E. Lyon =

Edward Eugene Lyon
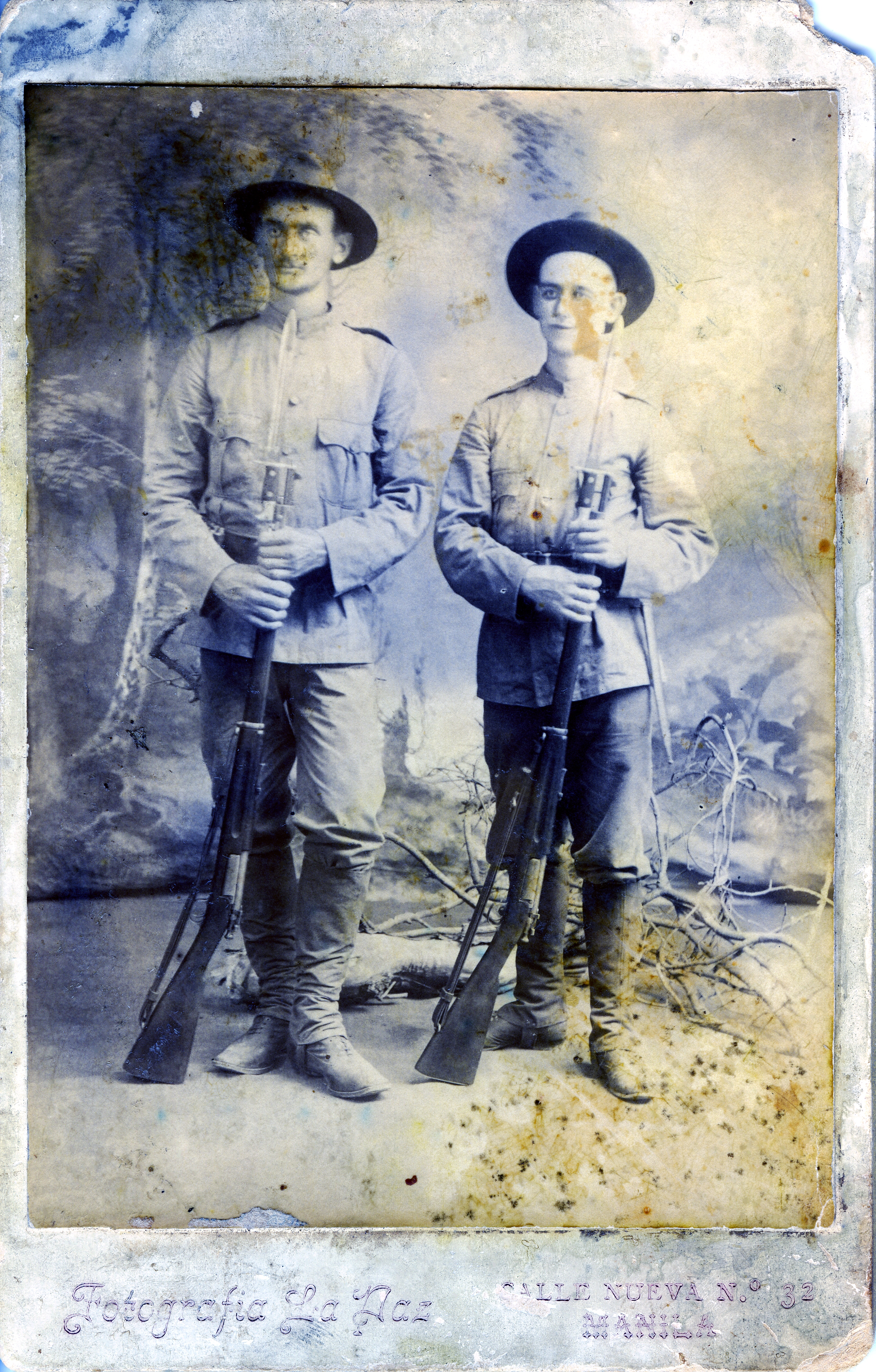
- Edward Lyon on left with fellow Medal of Honor recipient Marcus W. Robertson on the right in Manila, Philippines
- Born: August 8, 1871; Hixton, Wisconsin
- Died: November 18, 1931 (aged 60); California
- Burial place: Hollywood Forever Cemetery, Hollywood, California
- Military career
- Allegiance: United States of America
- Branch: United States Army
- Rank: Private
- Units: Young's Scouts, 2nd Oregon Volunteer Infantry Regiment
- Conflicts: Philippine–American War
- Awards: Medal of Honor
- Other work: Police Officer

Edward Eugene Lyon (August 8, 1871 – November 18, 1931) was a United States Army private who received the Medal of Honor for actions on May 13, 1899, during the Philippine–American War. Private Lyon was part of the Young's Scouts, 2nd Oregon Volunteer Infantry Regiment. He later became a police sergeant.

Private Lyon is buried in Hollywood Forever Cemetery, Hollywood, California.

== Medal of Honor citation ==
Rank and Organization: Private, Company B, 2d Oregon Volunteer Infantry. Place and Date: At San Miguel de Mayumo, Luzon, Philippine Islands, May 13, 1899. Entered Service At: Amboy, Wash. Birth: Hixton, Wis. Date of Issue: January 24, 1906.

Citation:

With 11 other scouts, without waiting for the supporting battalion to aid them or to get into position to do so, charged over a distance of about 150 yards and completely routed about 300 of the enemy, who were in line and in a position that could only be carried by a frontal attack.

== See also ==
- List of Philippine–American War Medal of Honor recipients
