= Gotfred Jensen =

United States Army Medal of Honor recipient

- Born: November 20, 1872; Denmark
- Died: December 26, 1945 (aged 73); Soap Lake, Washington, U.S.
- Burial place: Veteran's Home Cemetery, Port Orchard, Washington
- Military career
- Allegiance: United States
- Branch: United States Army
- Rank: Sergeant
- Units: Young's Scouts; 1st North Dakota Volunteer Infantry
- Conflicts: Philippine–American War
- Awards: Medal of Honor

Gotfred Jensen (November 20, 1872 in Denmark – December 26, 1945) was a United States Army soldier who received the Medal of Honor for actions during the Philippine–American War. He was a member of Young's Scouts and was one of thirteen Scouts awarded the Medal between 16 and May 19, 1899. Sergeant Jensen is buried in Veteran's Home Cemetery in Port Orchard, Washington.

== Medal of Honor citation ==
Rank and Organization: Private, Company D, 1st North Dakota Volunteer Infantry. Place and Date: At San Miguel de Mayumo, Luzon, Philippine Islands, May 13, 1899. Entered Service At: Devils Lake, N. Dak. Birth: Denmark. Date of Issue: June 6, 1906.

Citation:

With 11 other scouts, without waiting for the supporting battalion to aid them or to get into a position to do so, charged over a distance of about 150 yards and completely routed about 300 of the enemy, who were in line and in a position that could only be carried by a frontal attack.

== See also ==
- List of Medal of Honor recipients
