= Picard, California =

Picard
- Former settlement
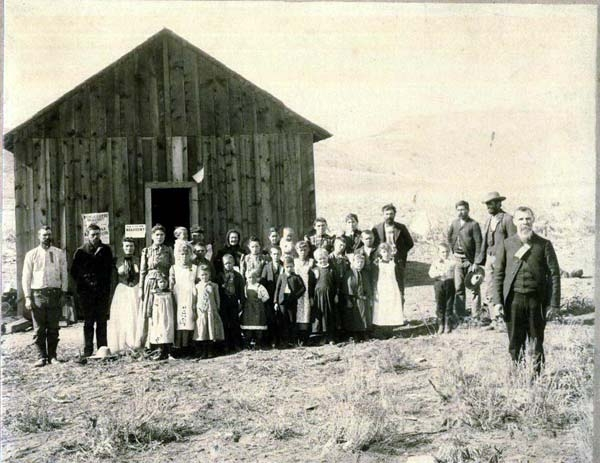
- La Lake School around 1898 to 1900

- Location in California
- Coordinates: 41°58′22″N 121°58′48″W
- Country: United States
- State: California
- County: Siskiyou
- Elevation: 4,300 ft (1,300 m)

Picard is a former settlement in Siskiyou County, California, United States. It was at an elevation of 1300 m; all that remains is the cemetery.

== History ==
Picard was settled in the early 1880s as the first town in the Butte valley when Frank Picard established the Pioneer saloon. Picard sold the saloon to Charles Silver in 1898. A post office opened in 1883, and the La Lake school opened in 1886 as Picard's first school. By 1903, Picard was a farming town and had a church, doctor's office, blacksmith, three general stores and two saloons and hotels. However, a new railway in 1908 bypassed Picard and the majority of businesses and residents moved to Dorris, leaving Picard abandoned. The school closed in 1912.

In 1938, the Siskiyou County Board of Supervisors formed the Picard cemetery district as a result of pressure from the Butte Valley American Legion. Prior to this, the cemetery had been cared by volunteers.

== Notable people ==
- Frank C. High, American soldier, recipient of the Medal of Honor (1875 – 1966)
