= Otto Boehler =

Otto A. Boehler
- Born: October 15, 1873; Germany
- Died: October 15, 1910 (aged 37)
- Burial place: St. Mary Catholic Church, Breckenridge, Minnesota, US
- Military career
- Allegiance: United States of America
- Branch: United States Army
- Rank: Private
- Units: Young's Scouts, 1st North Dakota Volunteer Infantry
- Conflicts: Philippine–American War
- Awards: Medal of Honor

Otto A. Boehler (October 15, 1873 – October 15, 1910) was a United States Army private who received the Medal of Honor for actions during the Philippine–American War.

== Biography ==
Otto Boehler was born October 15, 1873, in Germany.

He was one of Young's Scouts, who received one of 6 Medals of Honor presented for members of Young's Scouts on May 16, 1899, led that day by Captain William E. Birkhimer of the 3rd US Artillery.

Private Boehler is buried in the St. Mary's Catholic Church in Breckenridge Minnesota.

== Medal of Honor citation ==
Rank and Organization: Private, Company I, 1st North Dakota Volunteer Infantry. Place and Date: Near San Isidro, Philippine Islands, May 16, 1899. Entered Service At: Wahpeton, N. Dak. Birth: Germany. Date of Issue: May 17, 1906.

Citation:

With 21 other scouts charged across a burning bridge, under heavy fire, and completely routed 600 of the enemy who were entrenched in a strongly fortified position.

== See also ==
- List of Medal of Honor recipients
- List of Philippine–American War Medal of Honor recipients
