= Willis H. Downs =

William H. Downs
- Born: September 1866; Mount Carmel, Connecticut, US
- Died: September 15, 1929 (aged 62–63); Jamestown, North Dakota, US
- Burial place: Jamestown, North Dakota, US
- Military career
- Allegiance: United States
- Branch: United States Army
- Rank: Private & later Wagoner
- Units: Young's Scouts; 1st North Dakota Volunteer Infantry
- Awards: Medal of Honor

Willis H. Downs (September 1866–September 15, 1929) was a United States Army private who earned the Medal of Honor during the Philippine–American War. He later obtained the rank of Wagoner. Wagoner Downs is buried in the Highland Home Cemetery in Jamestown, North Dakota. He was one of twelve members of Young's Scouts awarded the Medal of Honor between 13 and May 16, 1899.

He is buried in Highland Home Cemetery, Jamestown, North Dakota. Downs is erroneously identified as having a birthdate of June 1870; this is incorrect, as evidenced by North Dakota Census documents, his obituary, and his headstone.

== Medal of Honor citation ==
Organization: Private, Company H, 1st North Dakota Volunteer Infantry. Place and Date: At San Miguel de Mayumo, Luzon, Philippine Islands, May 13, 1899. Entered Service At: Jamestown, N. Dak. Birth: Mount Carmel, Conn. Date of Issue: February 16, 1906.

Citation:

With 11 other scouts, without waiting for the supporting battalion to aid them or to get into a position to do so, charged over a distance of about 150 yards and completely routed about 300 of the enemy who were in line and in a position that could only be carried by a frontal attack.

== See also ==
- List of Medal of Honor recipients
- List of Philippine–American War Medal of Honor recipients
