= John Baxter Kinne =

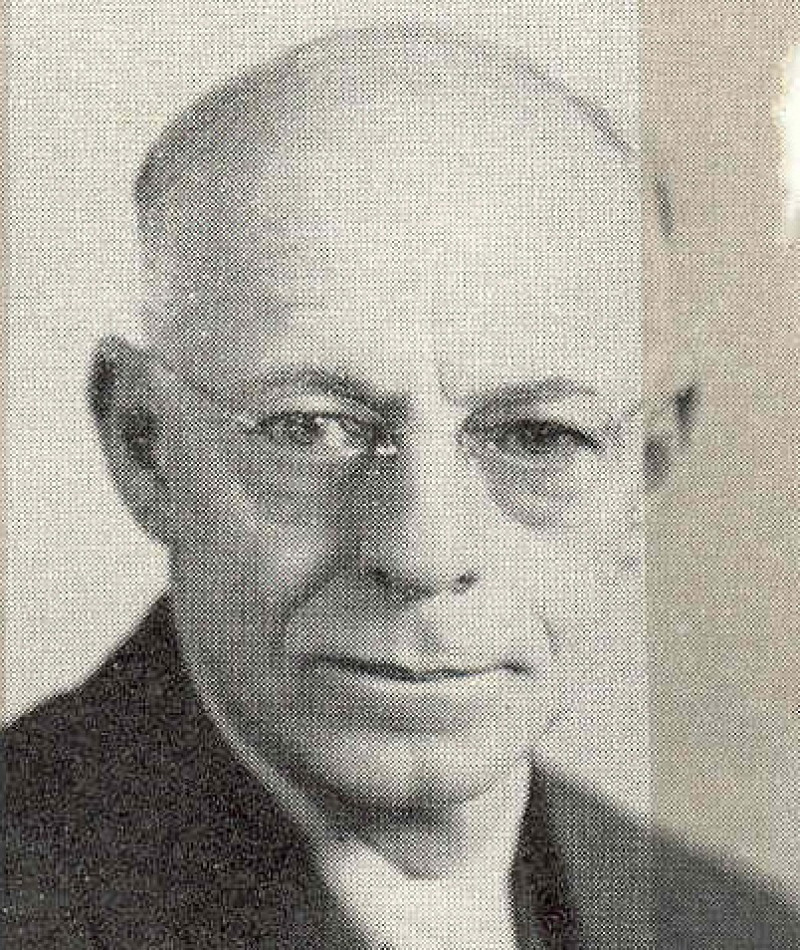
- John B. Kinne
- Born: December 3, 1877; Beloit, Wisconsin, US
- Died: July 19, 1954 (aged 76); Aberdeen, Washington, US
- Burial place: Fern Hill Cemetery, Aberdeen, Washington
- Military career
- Allegiance: United States of America
- Branch: United States Army
- Rank: Captain
- Units: Young's Scouts; 1st North Dakota Volunteers; Company B
- Conflicts: Philippine–American War, World War 1
- Awards: Medal of Honor

John Baxter Kinne (December 14, 1877 – July 19, 1954) was a United States Army soldier who received the Medal of Honor for actions during the Philippine–American War. He was among six men awarded the Medal for actions on May 16, 1899. His medal was awarded by President Theodore Roosevelt on May 17, 1906.

== Biography ==
John Kinne was born in Beloit, Wisconsin on December 3, 1877, to Mary A. Esplin and William O. Kinne. He entered active duty in the United States Army as a member of Company B, 1st North Dakota Volunteers.

During the Philippine–American War, Private Kinne was one of a hand-picked group of soldiers known as "Young's Scouts," tasked with being at the forefront of movement in Filipino-controlled areas. On May 13, 1899, five Scouts under Chief Scout William Henry Young earned Medals of Honor for gallantry in a frontal attack on 300 enemy. Kinne and several other Volunteers were assigned to join the depleted Scouts next day. On May 16, the Scouts were ordered to locate the enemy on the approach to San Isidro. As the Scouts approached the Cabon River to the southeast of San Isidro, they encountered a large enemy force entrenched on the opposite side. At the approach of the Americans, the Filipinos set fire to the bridge (called the Tarbon Bridge, for a nearby village of that name). Lt. James Thornton and two other Scouts sprinted across the bridge, firing at the enemy from point-blank range, while the remaining Scouts took cover and returned fire on the enemy trenches on the opposite bank. Private Kinne and the remaining Scouts then braved a hail of fire to rush across the burning bridge, rout the enemy, and extinguish the flames that were consuming the bridge. Private Kinne and five other Scouts earned the Medal of Honor for this action. In all, eleven members of Young's Scouts earned Medals of Honor in the three-day period.

After his discharge, John Kinne completed his undergraduate degree at Fargo College. In 1906 he completed his medical degree at Rush Medical College in Chicago. On October 14, 1908, he married Gertrude K. Adams (born in Racine, Wisconsin).

With a rank of captain, Kinne commanded an ambulance company in France in World War I.

John Kinne died in Aberdeen Washington July 19, 1954 and was interred at Fern Hill Cemetery in Aberdeen, Washington. When his wife Gertrude died in 1967 she was interred with him.

== Medal of Honor citation ==
Rank and Organization: Private, Company B, 1st North Dakota Infantry. Place and Date: Near San Isidro, Philippine Islands, May 16, 1899. Entered Service At: Fargo, N. Dak. Birth: Beloit, Wis. Date of Issue: May 17, 1906.

Citation:

With 21 other scouts charged across a burning bridge, under heavy fire, and completely routed 600 of the enemy who were entrenched in a strongly fortified position.

== See also ==
- List of Philippine–American War Medal of Honor recipients
