= Frank C. High =

Frank Charles High
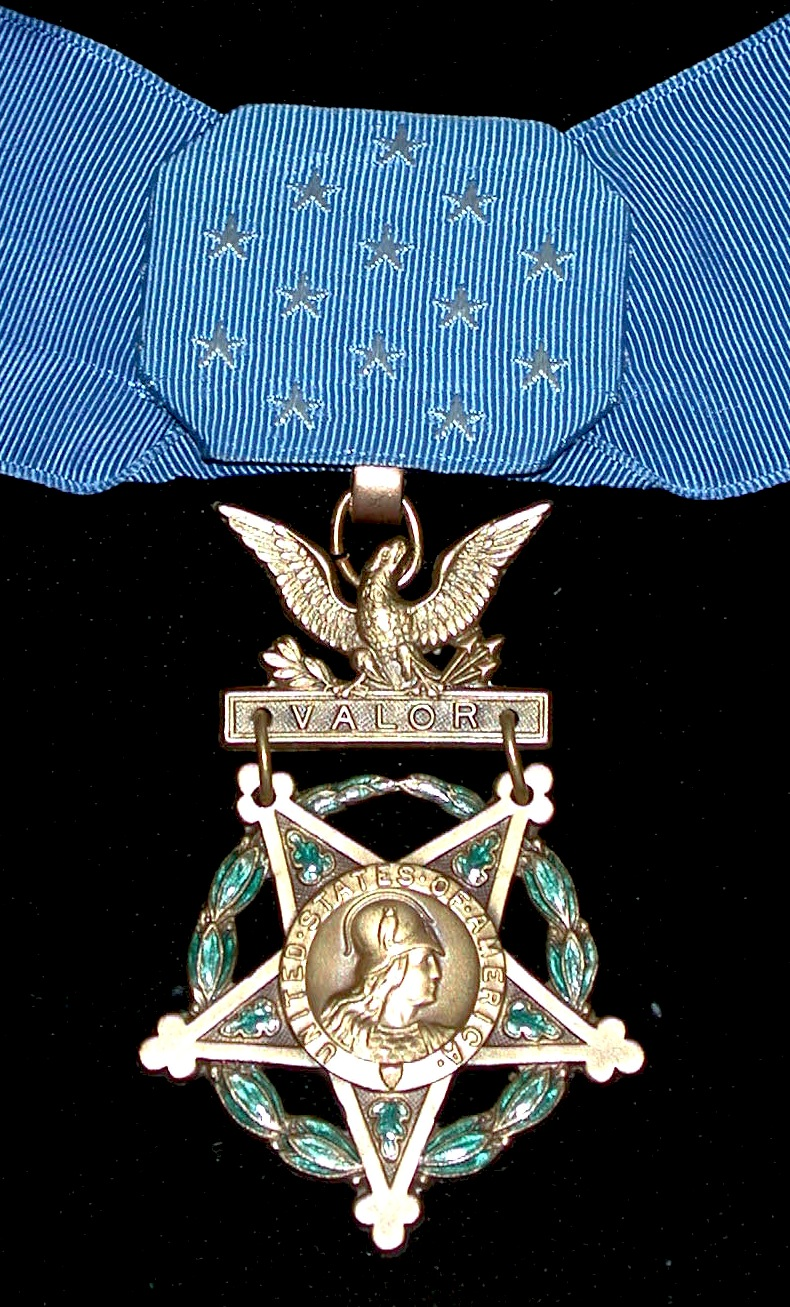
- Medal of Honor recipient
- Born: June 7, 1875; Yolo County, California, US
- Died: December 13, 1966 (aged 91); Ashland, Oregon, US
- Military career
- Allegiance: United States of America
- Branch: United States Army
- Rank: Private First Class
- Units: Young's Scouts, Company G, 2nd Oregon Volunteers
- Conflicts: Philippine–American War
- Awards: Medal of Honor

Frank Charles High (June 7, 1875 – December 13, 1966) was a United States Army soldier received the Medal of Honor for his actions during the Philippine–American War. High was one of thirteen members of Young's Scouts awarded the Medal of Honor for actions between May 13 and May 16, 1899.

High was born in Yolo County, California, where his family owned a ranch. He enlisted in the Army from Picard, California, and later arrived in Jacksonville, Oregon, from where he joined the 2nd Oregon Volunteers. During the Philippine–American War, he was a member of Young's Scouts. On May 16, 1899, Filipino fighters set fire to an important bridge near San Isidro. The river could not be forded, so High and other scouts rushed across the burning bridge, despite intense enemy fire, and engaged the entrenched Filipino forces. For these actions, High was awarded the Medal of Honor.

After returning home, High settled in Ashland, Oregon, where he lived until his death at age 91. High Street in Ashland is named in his honor.

== Medal of Honor citation ==
Rank and Organization: Private, U.S. Army, Company G, 2d Oregon Volunteer Infantry. Place and Date: Near San Isidro, Philippine Islands, May 16, 1899. Entered Service At: Picard, California. Birth: Yolo County, California, Calif. Date of Issue: Unknown.

Citation:

With 21 other scouts charged across a burning bridge, under heavy fire, and completely routed 600 of the enemy who were entrenched in a strongly fortified position.

== See also ==
- List of Philippine–American War Medal of Honor recipients
