= Marcus W. Robertson =

US Medal of Honor recipient (1870–1948)

Marcus William Robertson
- Marcus W. Robertson circa 1910 in Hood River, Oregon, from a larger family photograph
- Born: February 12, 1870; Flintville, Wisconsin, US
- Died: May 24, 1948 (aged 78); Portland, Oregon, US
- Burial place: Pine Grove Cemetery, Hood River, Oregon
- Military career
- Allegiance: United States of America
- Branch: United States Army
- Rank: Sergeant
- Units: Young's Scouts, 2nd Oregon Volunteer Infantry Regiment
- Conflicts: Philippine–American War; World War I
- Awards: Medal of Honor

Marcus William Robertson (February 12, 1870 – May 24, 1948) was a United States Army soldier and a recipient of America's highest military decoration—the Medal of Honor—for his actions during the Philippine–American War.

Marcus Robertson enlisted in the United States Army from Hood River, Oregon in May 1898, and, by May 16, 1899, was serving as a private in Company B of the 2nd Oregon Volunteer Infantry Regiment as part of Young's Scouts. On that day, near San Isidro in the Philippines, Private Robertson helped to rout a large enemy force despite being greatly outnumbered. For his actions, he was presented with the Medal of Honor on April 28, 1906. He later rose to the rank of stable Sergeant and served in France during World War I.

He died at age 78 and was buried in Pine Grove Cemetery, Hood River, Oregon.

== Medal of Honor citation ==
Rank and organization: Private, Company B, 2nd Oregon Volunteer Infantry. Place and date: Near San Isidro, Philippine Islands, May 16, 1899. Entered service at: Hood River, Oreg. Birth: Flintville, Wisconsin Date of issue: April 28, 1906.

Citation

"With 21 other scouts charged across a burning bridge, under heavy fire, and completely routed 600 of the enemy who were entrenched in a strongly fortified position."

== See also ==
- List of Medal of Honor recipients

== Gallery ==
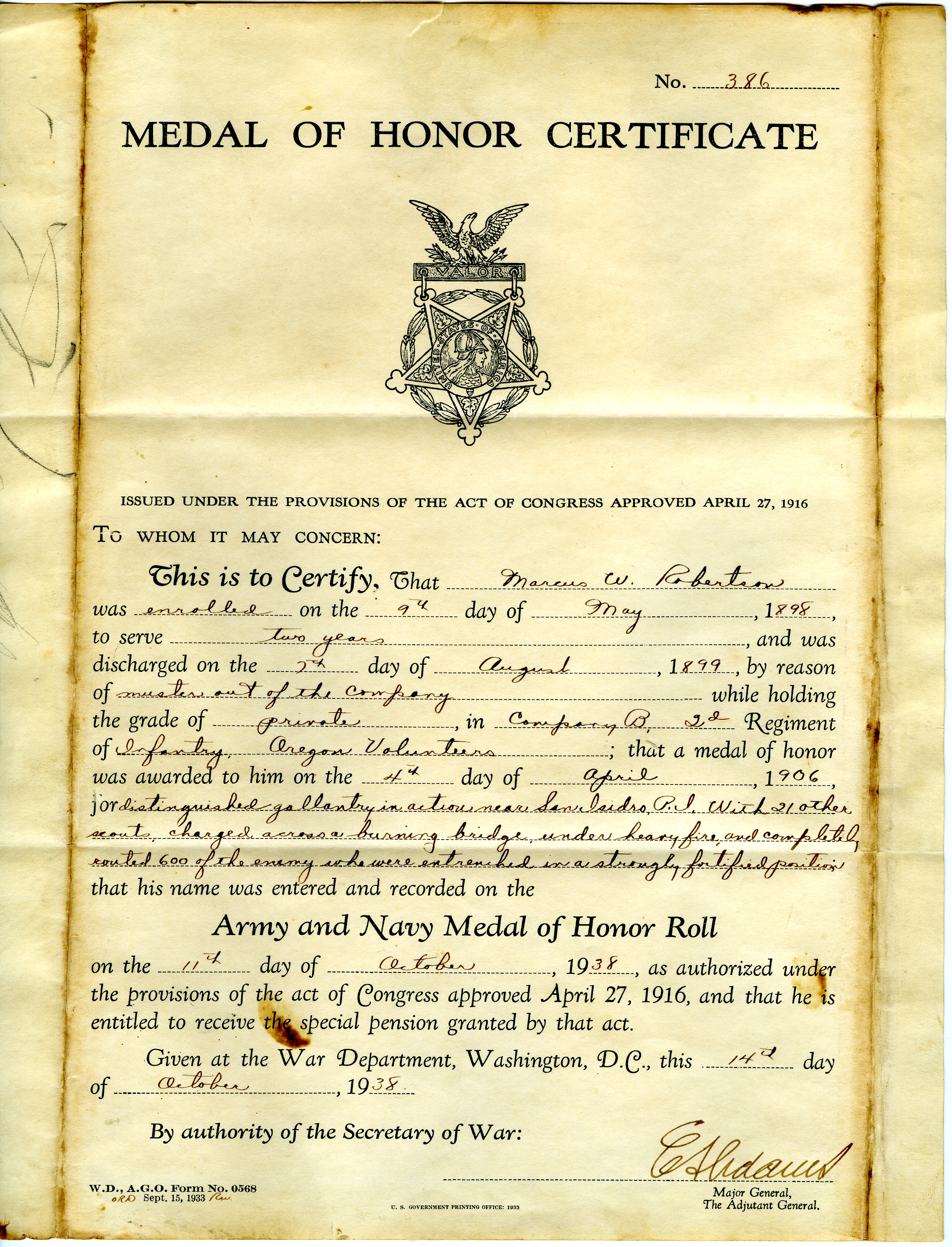
Medal of Honor Certificate presented to Marcus W. Robertson

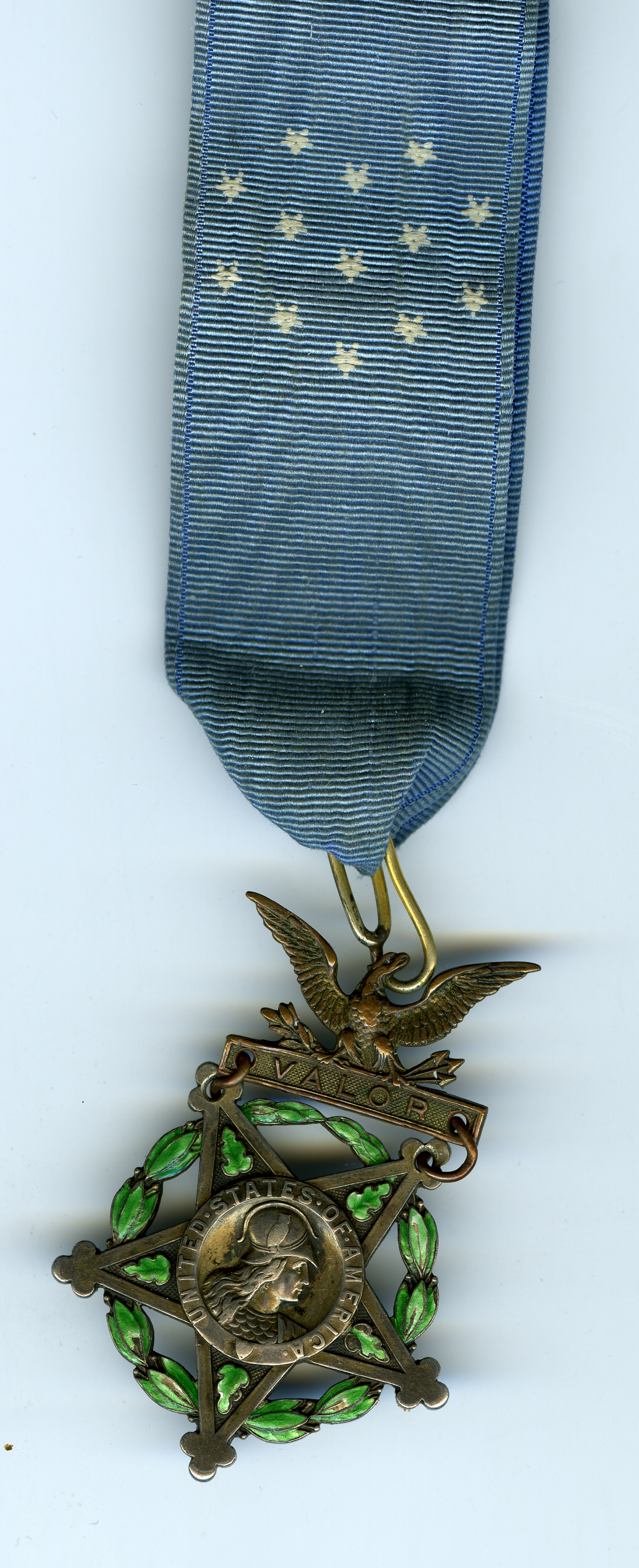
View of Front of Medal of Honor presented to Marcus W. Robertson

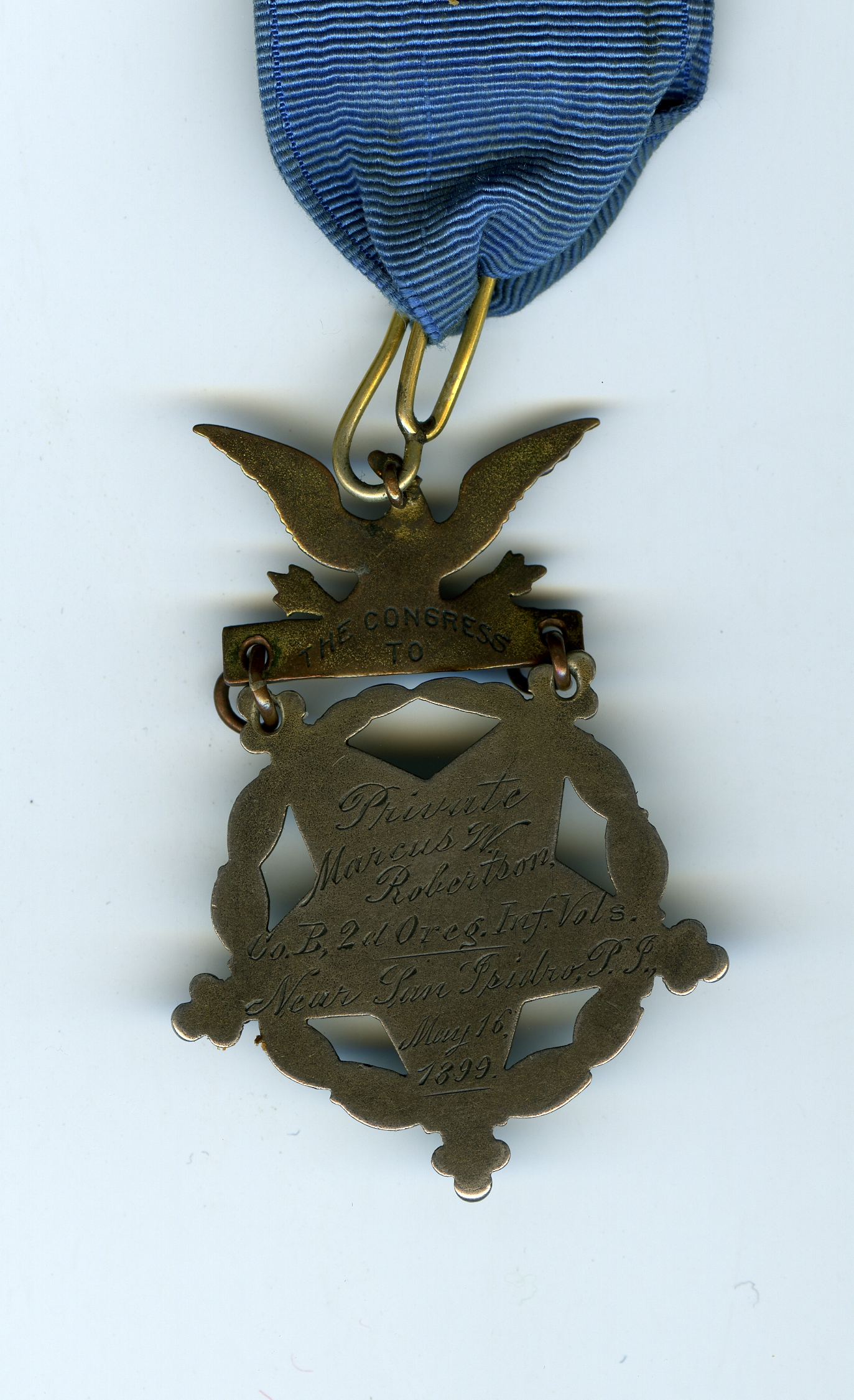
View of back of Medal of Honor presented to Marcus W. Robertson with inscription

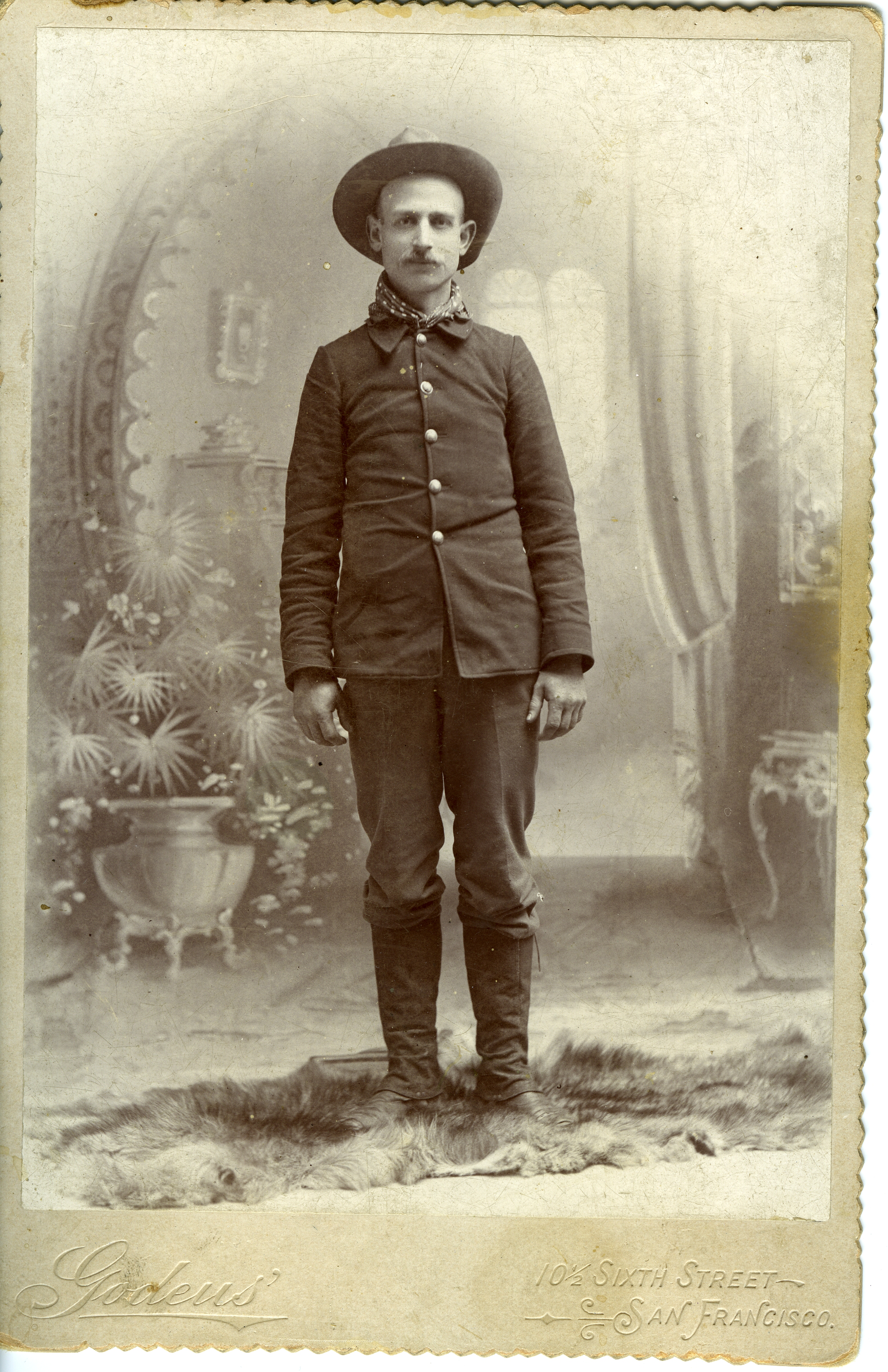
Marcus W. Robertson, picture taken in San Francisco, California, en route to Philippines with Oregon Volunteers

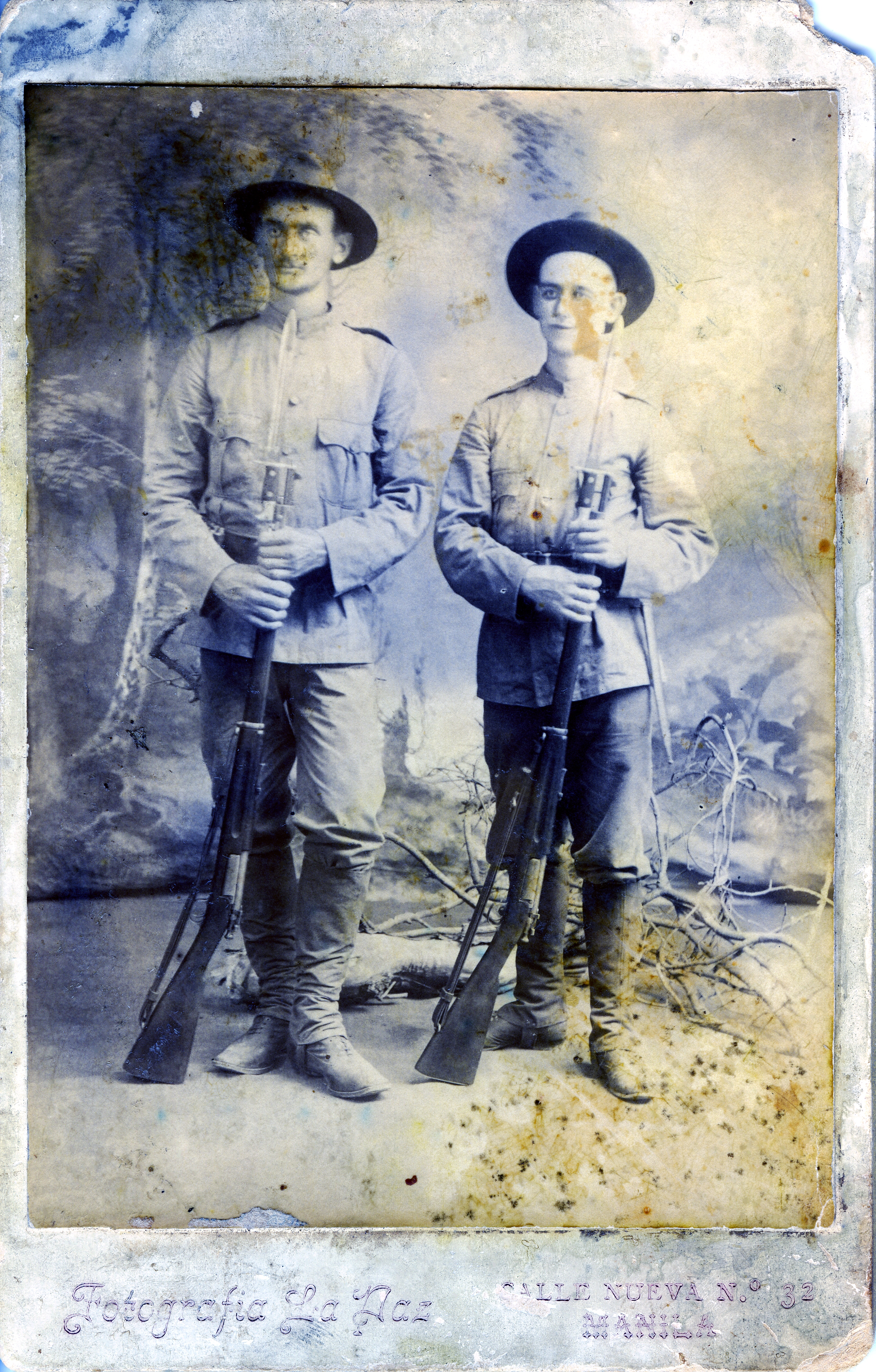
Marcus W. Robertson on the right with fellow Medal of Honor recipient Edward E. Lyon on left in Manila, Philippines

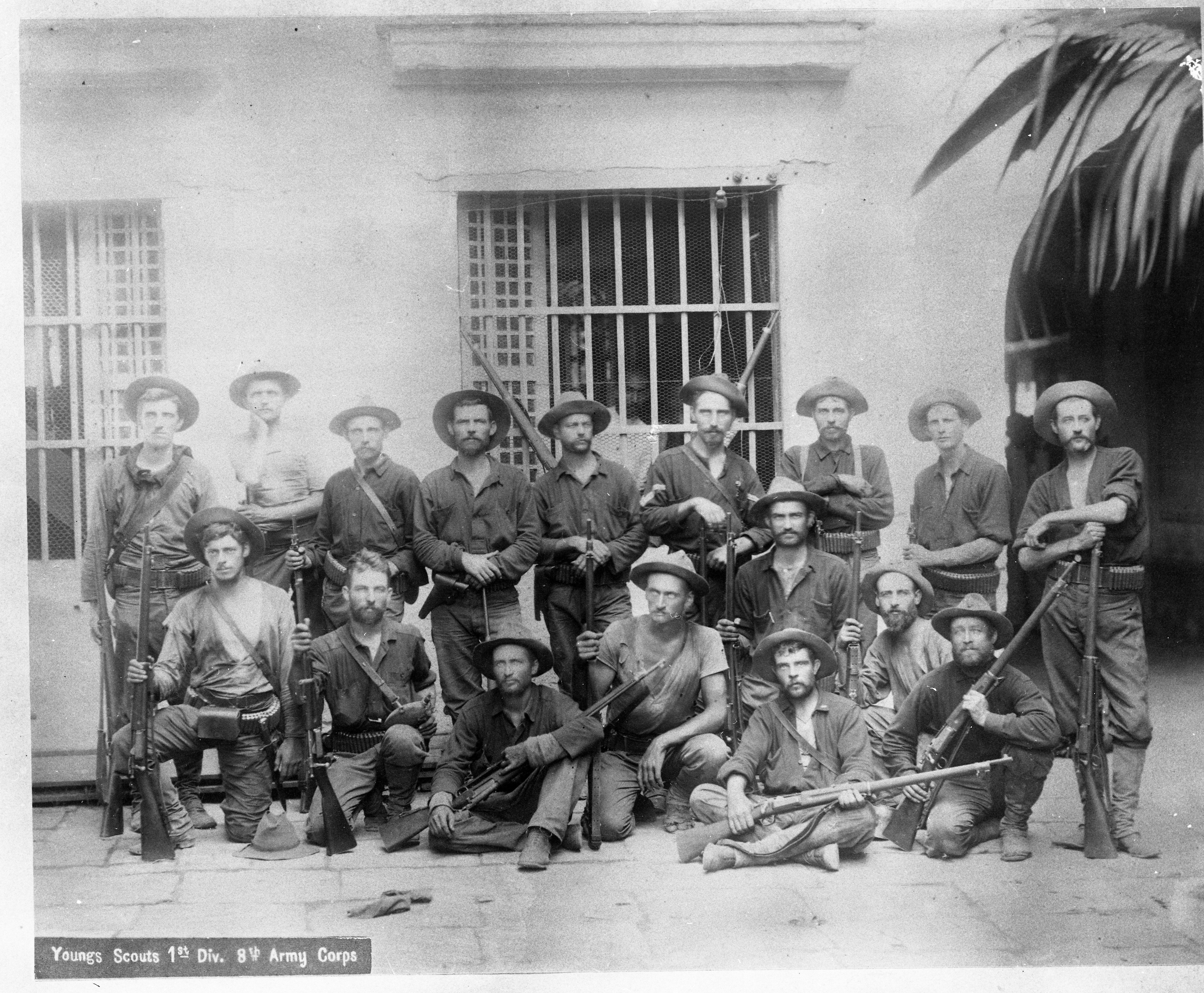
Picture of Young's Scouts in the Philippines, including Marcus W. Robertson 2nd from right front, squatting.

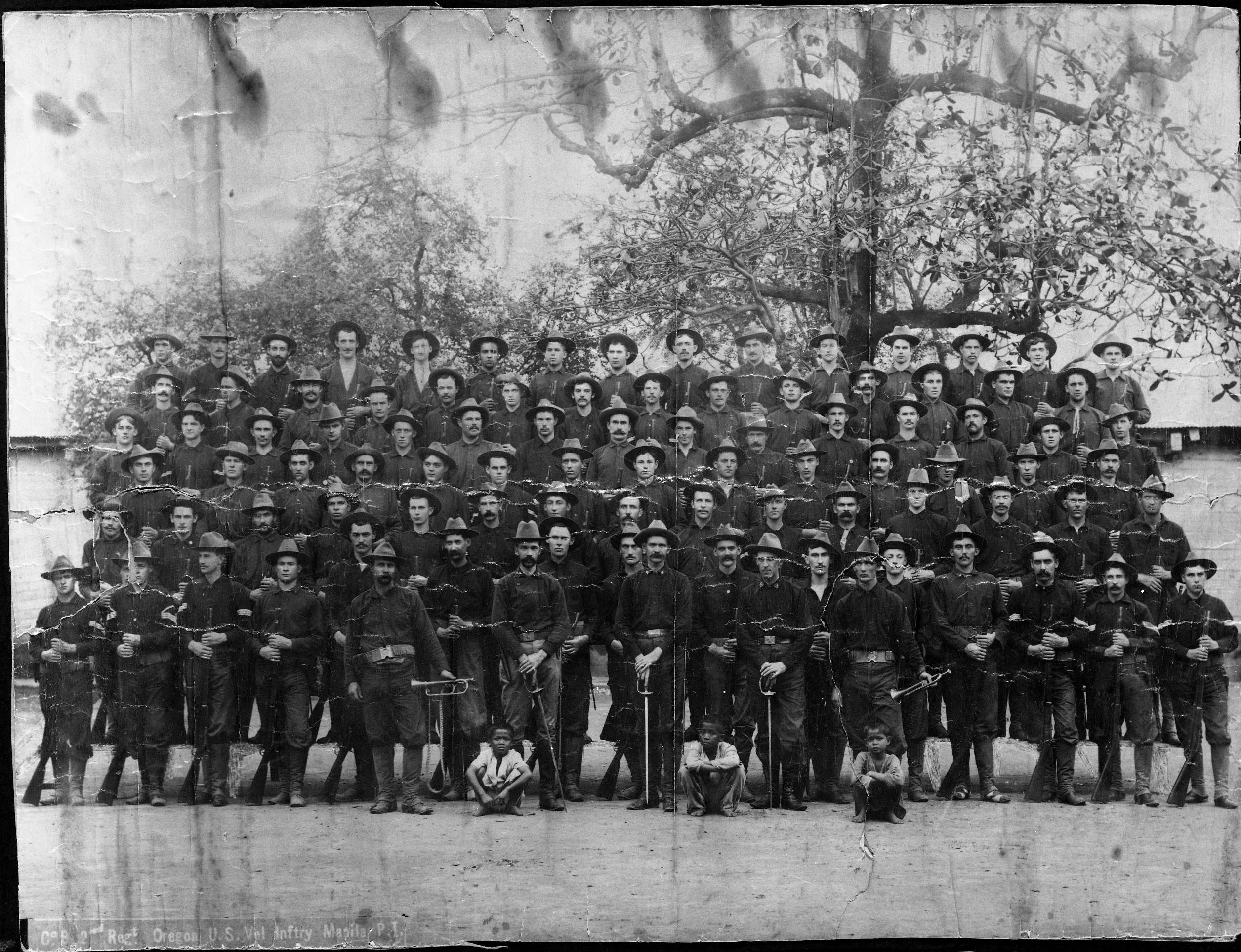
Company B, Second Regiment, Oregon Volunteers, US Infantry, including Marcus W. Robertson top row, third from right.
