= 2nd Oregon Volunteer Infantry Regiment =

- Flag of the United States, 1896–1908
- Active: 7 May 1898 – 7 August 1899
- Disbanded: 7 August 1899
- Country: United States
- Allegiance: Oregon
- Branch: United States Army
- Type: Infantry
- Size: 50 officers and 970 enlisted
- Engagements: Capture of Guam, Battle of Manila (1898), Second Battle of Caloocan

The 2nd Oregon Volunteer Infantry Regiment was a military regiment recruited in the U.S. state of Oregon during the Spanish–American War. As the first foreign war in U.S. history, it was the first time members of the Oregon National Guard had fought on foreign soil. The regiment also served with distinction in the Philippine–American War. At full strength, it was composed of 50 officers and 970 enlisted men. The regiment's last company was mustered out of service in August 1899.

== History ==
=== Spanish–American War ===
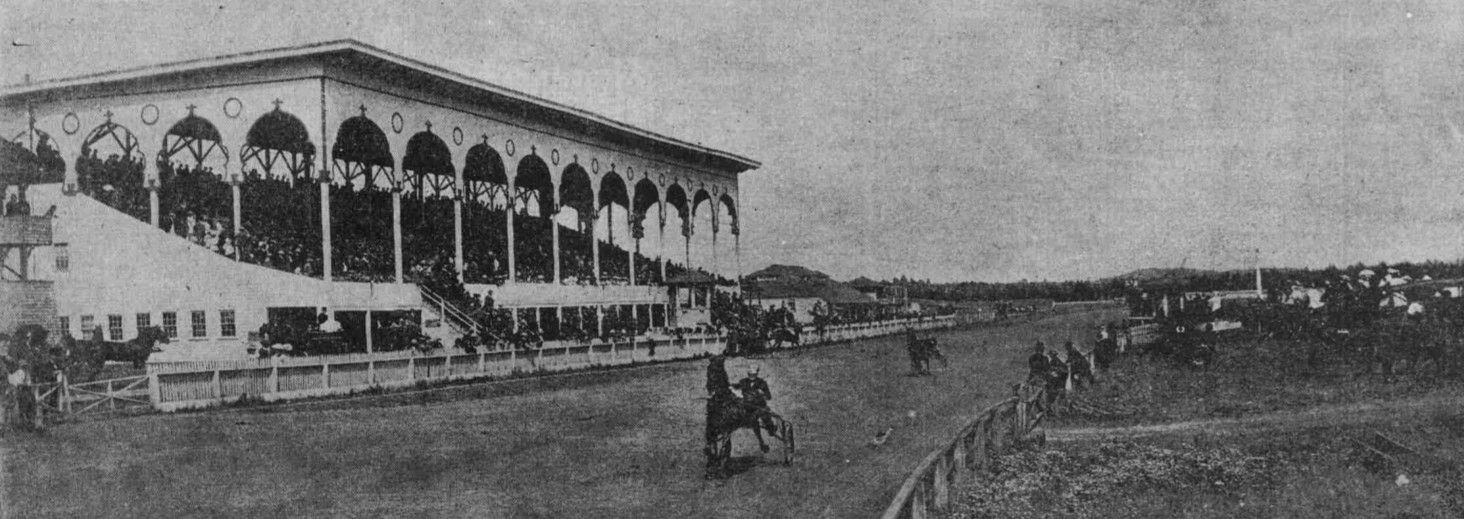
The racetrack in Irving Park in 1907

The regiment was formed after the battleship USS Maine exploded in Havana Harbor in Cuba on 15 February 1898. Cuba was under Spanish rule at the time and the United States became involved in the Cuban War of Independence when the U.S. Congress declared war on Spain on 21 April 1898, beginning the Spanish–American War. On 25 April 1898, President William McKinley asked Oregon for a regiment of infantry, preferably recruited from the existing National Guard. Oregon's was considered one of the nation's better equipped and trained guards.

The regiment was organized and mustered by 8 May at Camp McKinley on the racetrack grounds at Irving Park in Portland, and named the 2nd as the 1st had been organized in 1864 to guard trade routes and escort immigrant wagon trains. After a few days training under Colonel Owen Summers, it departed for the Presidio of San Francisco. On 25 May, the regiment embarked at San Francisco en route for the Philippines.

On 21 June, the 2nd Oregon participated in the surrender of Guam. The 2nd Oregon next landed at the Philippines, the first U.S. Army unit to do so. It was also the first unit to enter the Walled City of Manila, and took part in the surrender of the Spanish army in Manila on 13 August. Beginning on 16 August, the regiment served guard duty in Manila.

=== Philippine–American War ===
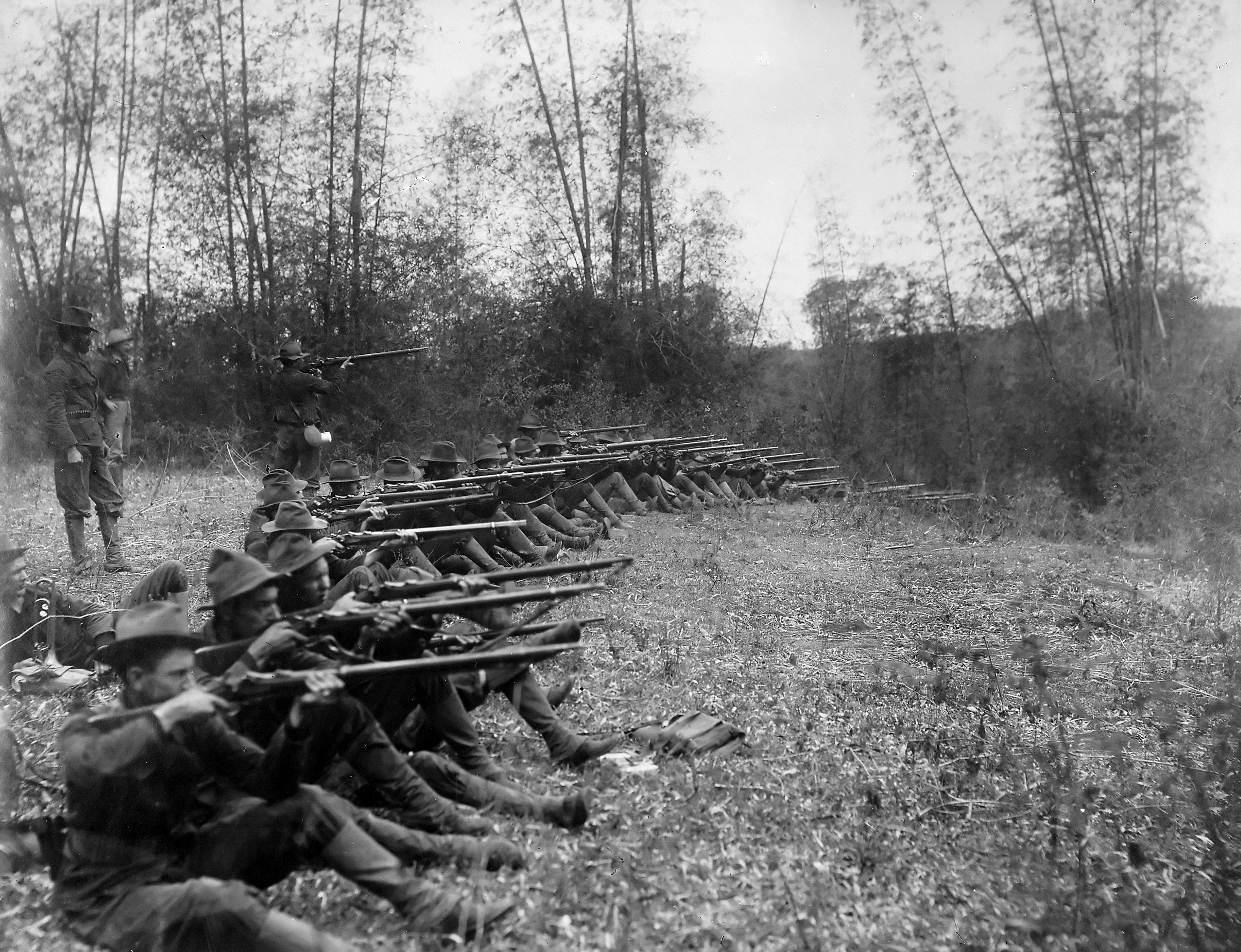
Oregon Volunteers in Pasig, Philippines

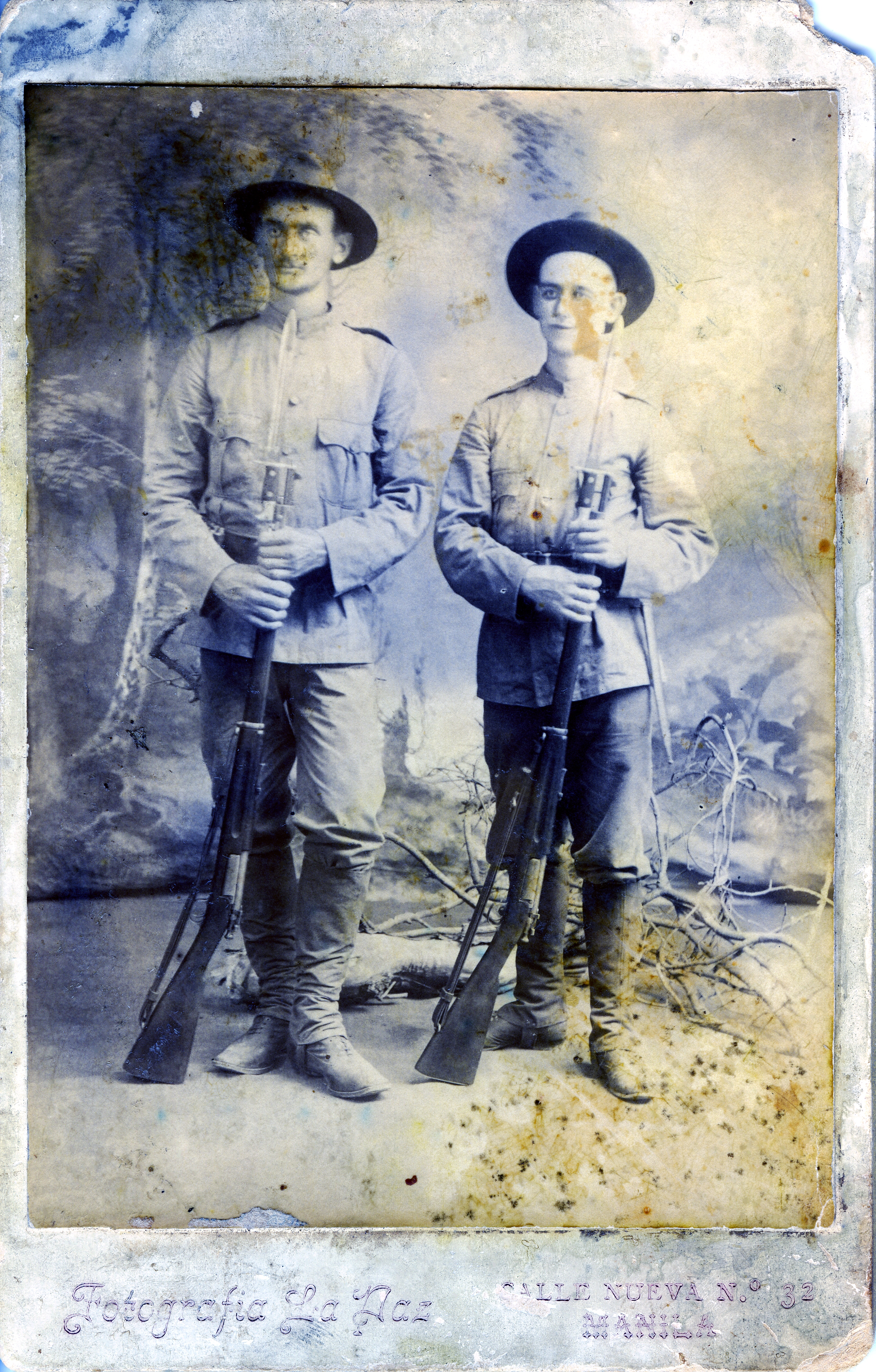
Edward Lyon and Marcus Robertson in the Philippines

On 4 February 1899, Philippine insurgents attacked U.S. troops in Manila, beginning the Philippine–American War. Oregon troops fought in five campaigns and forty-two battles, engagements, and skirmishes over the next four months. During these actions, sixteen Oregonians were killed or died of wounds, forty-eight died of other causes, and eighty-eight were wounded.

Three members of the regiment were awarded the Medal of Honor for heroism while serving as Young's Scouts: Private Frank C. High of Jacksonville, Private Edward E. Lyon of Portland, and Private Marcus W. Robertson of Hood River. They were the only three Oregonians out of twelve Oregon-based recipients to be awarded the medal while still alive.

On March 18, 1899, after receiving exaggerated reports that two companies of the 22nd Infantry Regiment had been massacred by Filipino insurgents in an ambush, the regiment killed or drowned every civilian they found in a twelve mile radius around the San Mateo River. The massacre was described in a letter written by F. L. Poindexter, a soldier in the regiment.

On 13 May 1899, Private Lyon, with eleven other scouts, "without waiting for the supporting battalion to aid them or to get into position to do so, charged over a distance of about 150 yards and completely routed about 300 of the enemy, who were in line and in a position that could only be carried by a frontal attack". Three days later, 21 of the same scouts, including High and Robertson, "charged across a burning bridge, under heavy fire, and completely routed 600 of the enemy who were entrenched in a strongly fortified position".

The regiment sailed for Oregon on 14 June 1899, and was among the first infantry units to return to the United States from the Philippines. Major General Henry Ware Lawton told the soldiers before their departure: "You have nobly earned the reputation of being among the best soldiers of the American Army." The 2nd Oregon received a hero's welcome when it arrived in San Francisco on 13 July 1899.

== Chronology ==
On 7 to 15 May 1898, the regiment was mustered into the service of the United States at Portland with 50 officers and 970 enlisted men, having been organized at McMinnville, Eugene, Portland, and Salem.

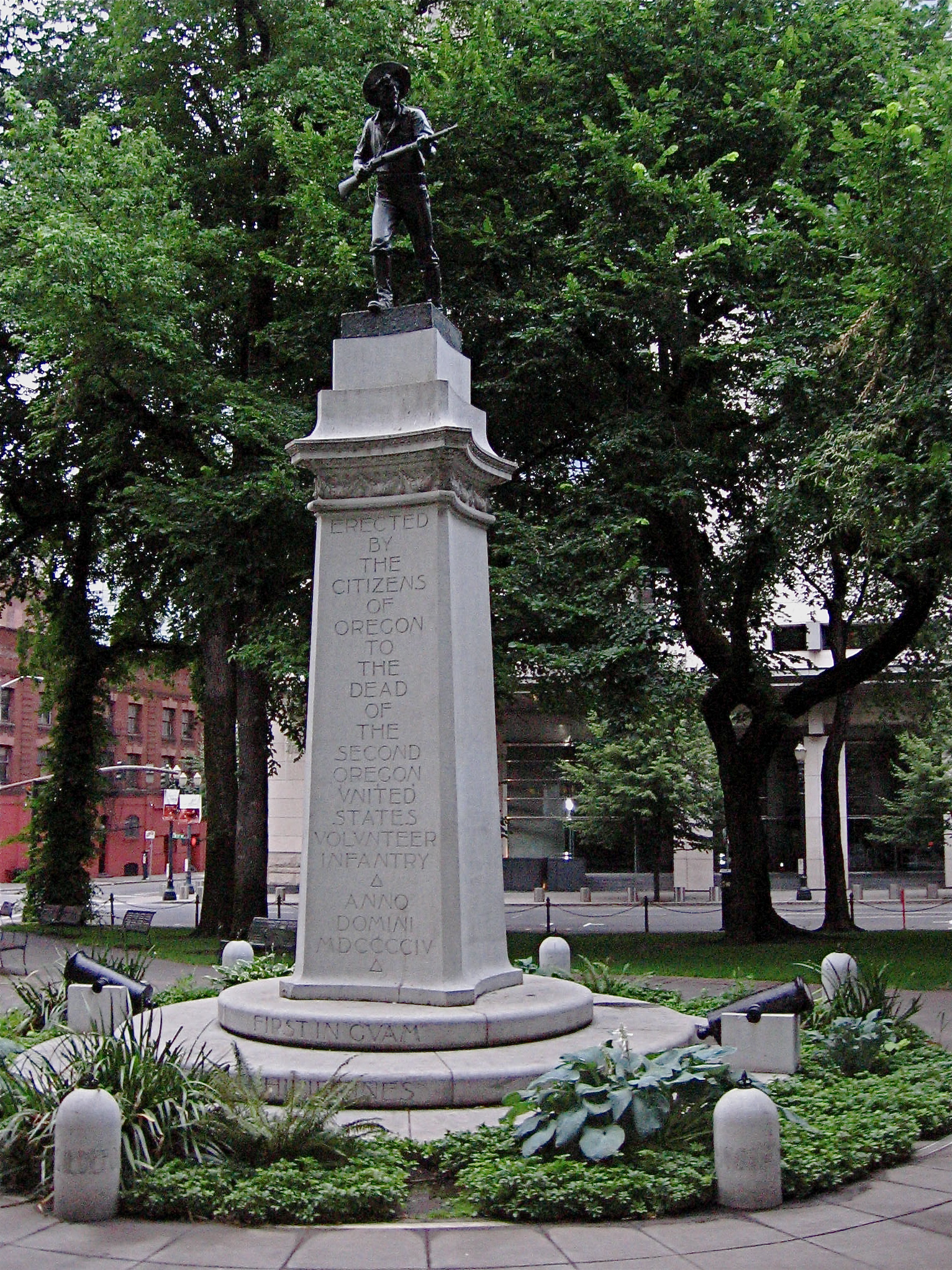
The Spanish–American War Soldier's Monument in Lownsdale Square, Portland

On 11 and 16 May 1898, the regiment left Portland, arriving at San Francisco the 13th and 18th, and embarking on the steamships Australia and City of Sydney on 25 May and arriving at Guam, Ladrone Islands on 20 June.

On 21 June, they participated in the capture of Guam, then sailed on the 22nd for Manila Bay, arriving on the 30th.

Until 12 August, the regiment was stationed at Cavite; they were attached to the First Division, Eighth Army Corps on the 12th and participated in the assault on and capture of Manila on the 13th.

In February 1899, the 2nd began engaging the insurgents, fighting in Manila the 4th-5th, at the Santa Mesa Pumping Station on the 6th, the Second Battle of Caloocan, Manila the 22nd-23rd, and at Marikina Road on 24 February and 5 March.

In March, the regiment fought at Guadalupe on the 13th, Pasig on the 14th, Taguig on the 18th, Laguna de Bay on the 19th, Malabon on the 25th, and Polo on the 26th.

In April, the 2nd was at Santa Maria on the 12th, Norzagaray, the 23rd–25th, Calumpit on the 24th, and Angat on the 25th.

In May, they engaged the insurgents at San Rafael on the 1st, at Baliuag on the 2nd, Maasin on the 4th, San Ildefonso on the 8th, San Miguel on the 13th, San Isidro on the 17th, San Antonio on the 20th, Arayat on the 22nd, and Malinta on the 27th.

In June, the regiment fought at Taytay on the 3rd and Antipolo on the 4th.

On 14 June, the 2nd Oregon left Manila on the transports Newport and Ohio, arriving at San Francisco on 12 July, where 44 officers and 1,024 enlisted men were mustered out of the service of the United States on 7 August 1899.

Casualties while in service included 5 officers wounded. Among enlisted men, 69 were wounded and 55 killed (13 in action, 3 of wounds, 38 of disease, 1 by accident), and 3 desertions.

== Memorials ==
Sculptures and other memorials in Oregon for the 2nd Oregon include the Fountain for Company H (1914) and Douglas Tilden's Spanish–American War Soldier's Monument (1906) in the Plaza Blocks in downtown Portland, and a memorial in Portland's River View Cemetery. There is also a memorial on the grounds of the Oregon Department of Veterans' Affairs in Salem. The plaque had formerly been located in the basement of the Oregon State Capitol.

== See also ==
- List of Philippine–American War Medal of Honor recipients
- Oregon Civil Defense Force
- Oregon Volunteers (disambiguation)
- SS City of Peking
