= Young's Scouts =

Young's Scouts was a select group of United States Army soldiers during the Philippine–American War organized under a Vermont civilian named William Henry Young.

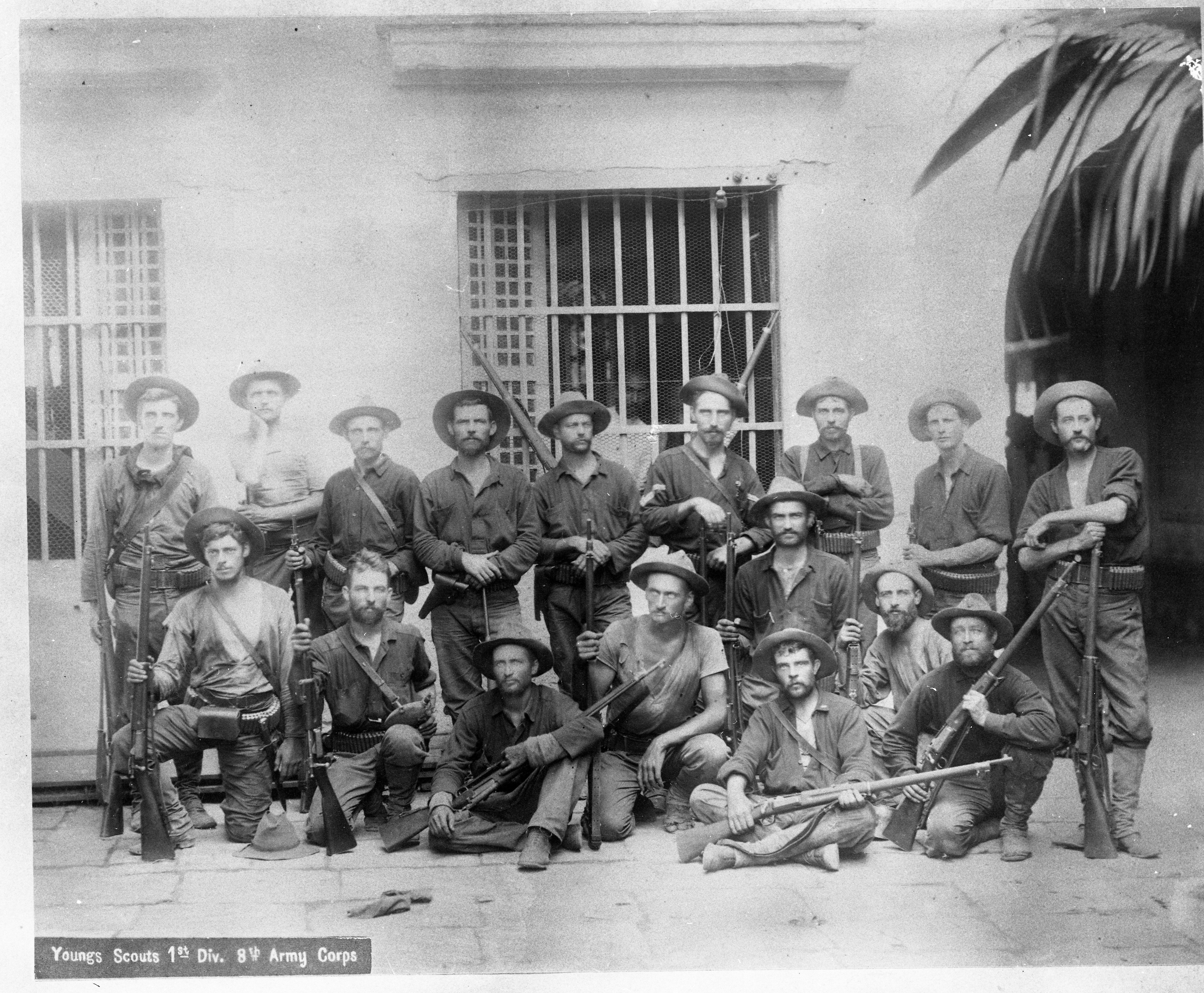
Young's Scouts, 1st Division, 8th Army Corps, U.S. Army in Philippines, including Medal of Honor recipients Richard M. Longfellow and Marcus W. Robertson, front row, 2nd from right squatting

== Unit history ==
Because of his previous experience as a soldier and soldier of fortune and his demonstrated coolness under fire, Young came to the notice of General Henry W. Lawton, who hired Young as his Chief Scout during Lawton's Northern Campaign. Young had served with the Army in the Nez Perce War, prospected for gold in California and Montana and worked as a soldier of fortune and mine supervisor in Korea and China. He made his way to the Philippines to prospect for gold.

Young's Scouts acted as an advance guard and engaged in search and destroy missions. The exploits and valor of Young's Scouts soon brought them to the attention of the American public.

Members of Young's Scouts came from several units in Lawton's command, including the 1st North Dakota Volunteers, the 2nd Oregon Volunteers, and the 4th U.S. Cavalry (dismounted). Although the original unit was composed of 25 men, Scouts came and went as casualties and sickness took their toll. In two different engagements a number of Scouts were recommended for the Medal of Honor, which at the time was the only Army award for valor.

On May 14, 1899, William Young was wounded in the knee in an engagement at San Miguel de Mayumo with what was described as a minor wound. He was conveyed to the 1st Reserve Hospital in Manila with a request by Lawton that he receive the best of care. Ironically, although the initial assessment of Young's wound was that he would probably end up with nothing more serious than a stiff knee, he died a few days later, presumably of tetanus.

Young's Scouts continued to operate under several different officers for the remainder of Lawton's Northern Campaign.

== Gallery ==
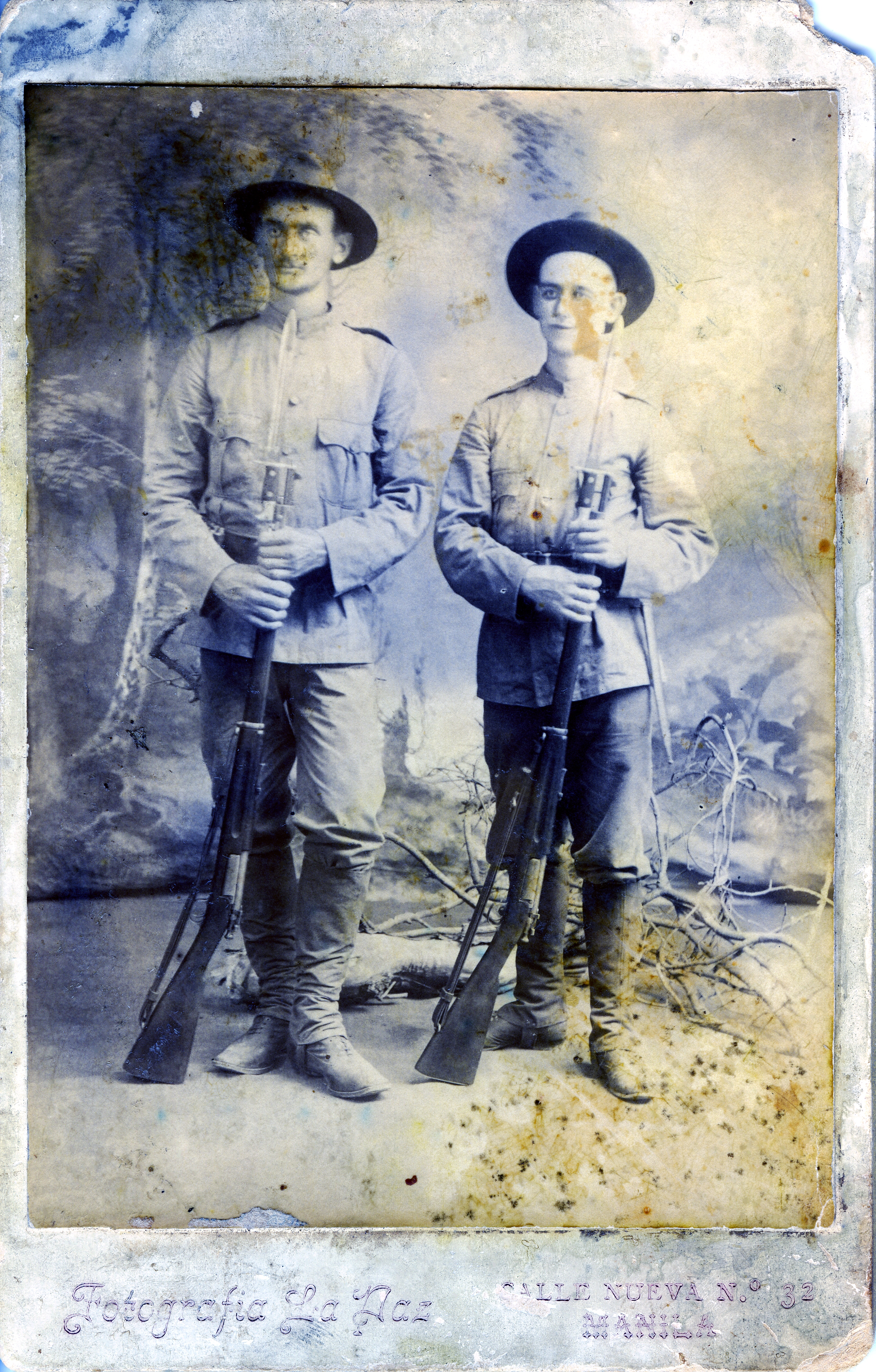
Medal of Honor recipients Edward E. Lyon on left and Marcus W. Robertson on the right in Manila, Philippines

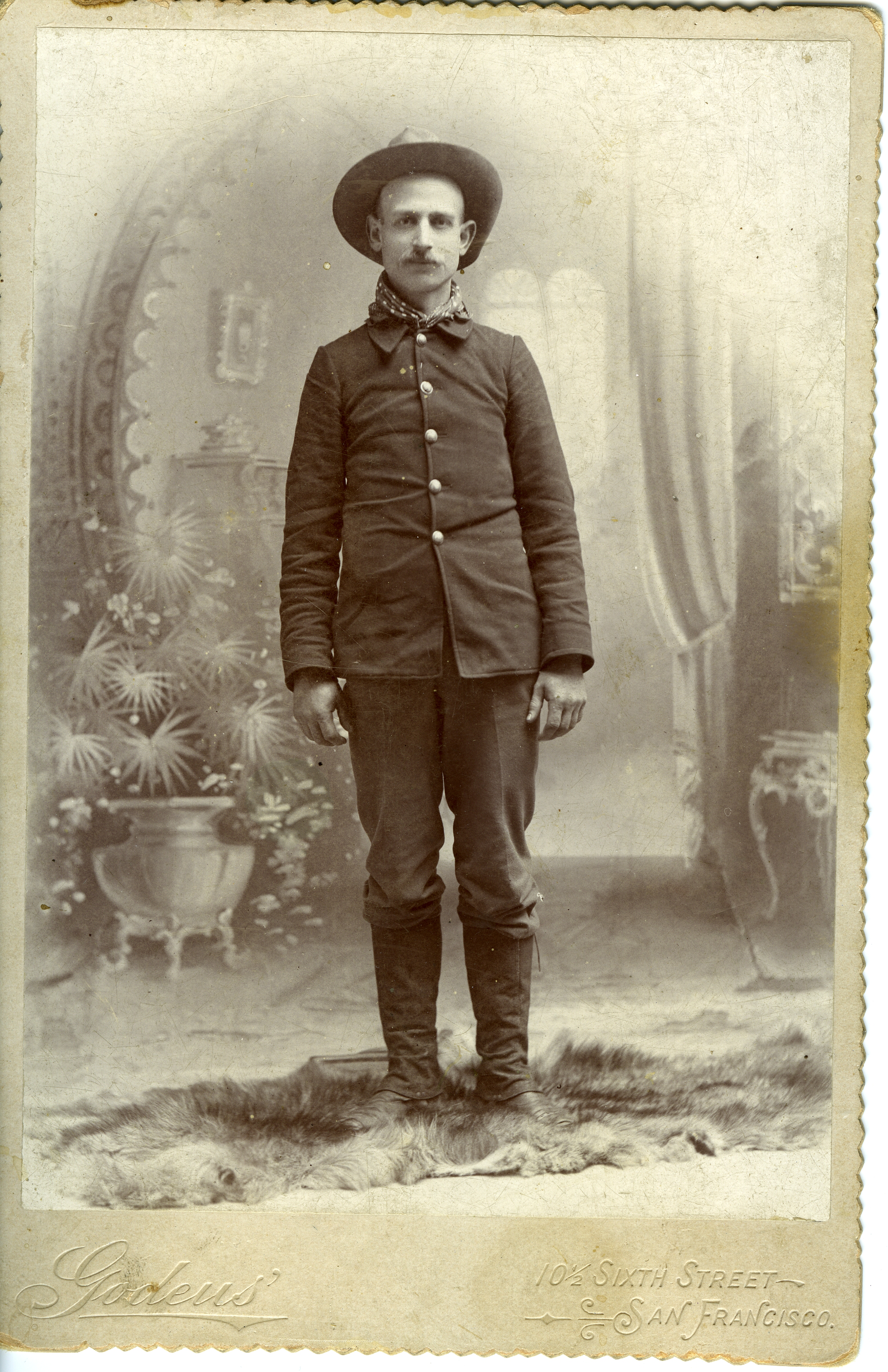
Marcus W. Robertson in San Francisco, California, picture taken en route to Philippines

== Medal of Honor recipients ==
- Captain William Edward Birkhimer (commander). Birkhimer later retired as a brigadier general
- Corporal Frank LaFayette Anders, who became a geologist and historian
- Private Otto Boehler
- Private Charles P. Davis
- Private Willis H. Downs
- Private Frank Charles High
- Private Gotfred Jensen Jensen later retired as a Sergeant
- Private John Baxter Kinne
- Private Richard Moses Longfellow
- Private Edward Eugene Lyon
- Private Peter H. Quinn
- Private Marcus William Robertson
- Private Frank Fulton Ross
- Private Thomas Sletteland

== Sources ==
- Soldiers In The Sun ............. San Isidro, Luzon, Philippine Islands, May 6, 1899
- Dakota Datebook May 14, 2004 "Philippine–American War"
