= Richard M. Longfellow =

United States Army Medal of Honor recipient

Richard Moses Longfellow
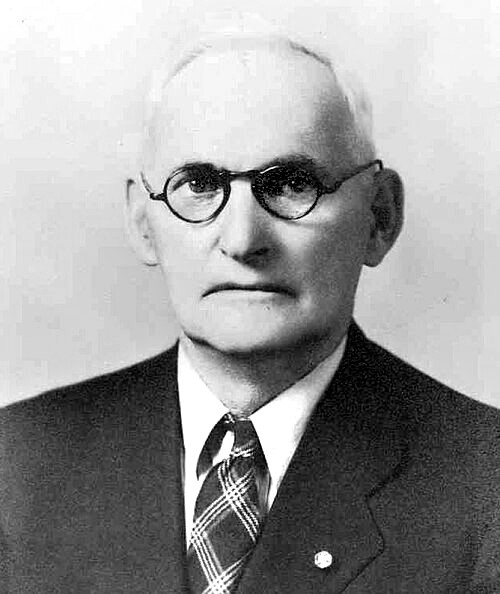
- Medal of Honor Recipient Richard M. Longfellow
- Born: June 24, 1867; Logan County, Illinois
- Died: May 17, 1951 (aged 83); Lewiston, Idaho, U.S.
- Burial place: Normal Hill Cemetery Lewiston, Idaho
- Military career
- Allegiance: United States
- Branch: United States Army
- Rank: Private
- Units: Young's Scouts, 1st North Dakota Volunteer Infantry
- Conflicts: Philippine–American War
- Awards: Medal of Honor

Richard Moses Longfellow (June 24, 1867 – May 17, 1951) was a United States Army Private who received the Medal of Honor for actions on May 16, 1899. Private Longfellow was part of Young's Scouts.

He is buried at Normal Hill Cemetery in Lewiston, Idaho.

== Medal of Honor citation ==
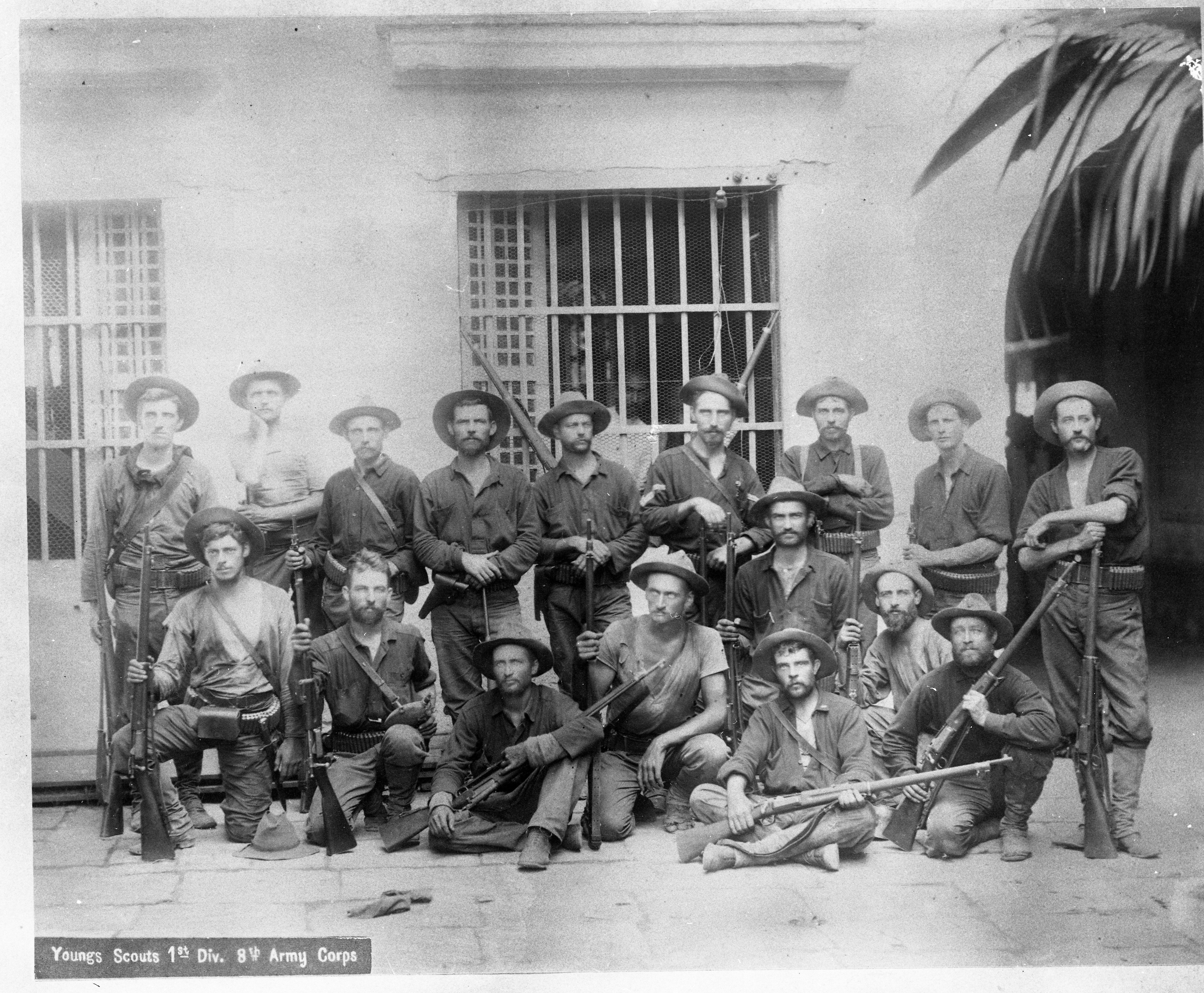
Longfellow (crouching, fourth from right) with Young's Scouts in the Philippines

Rank and Organization: Private, Company A, 1st North Dakota Volunteer Infantry. Place and Date: Near San Isidro, Philippine Islands, May 16, 1899. Entered Service At: Mandan, N. Dak. Birth: Logan County, Ill, Date of Issue: Unknown.

Citation:

With 21 other scouts charged across a burning bridge, under heavy fire, and completely routed 600 of the enemy who were entrenched in a strongly fortified position.

== See also ==
- List of Medal of Honor recipients
- List of Philippine–American War Medal of Honor recipients
