= Peter H. Quinn =

U.S. Army soldier

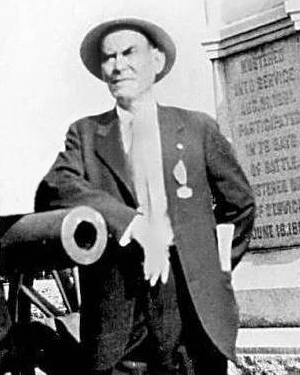
- Peter H. Quinn at Gettysburg, Pennsylvania
- Born: May 1873; San Francisco, California, US
- Died: April 19, 1934 (aged 60–61)
- Burial place: Arlington National Cemetery
- Military career
- Allegiance: United States of America
- Branch: United States Army
- Rank: Private
- Units: Young's Scouts; U.S. 4th Cavalry Regiment
- Conflicts: Philippine–American War
- Awards: Medal of Honor

Peter H. Quinn (May 1873 – April 19, 1934) was a United States Army soldier who received the Medal of Honor for actions on May 13, 1899, during the Philippine–American War. Private Quinn is buried at Arlington National Cemetery.

== Medal of Honor citation ==
Rank and organization: Private, Company L, 4th U.S. Cavalry. Place and date: At San Miguel de Mayumo, Luzon, Philippine Islands, May 13, 1899. Entered service at: San Francisco, California. Birth: San Francisco, California. Date of issue: June 6, 1906.

Citation:

With 11 other scouts without waiting for the supporting battalion to aid them or to get into a position to do so, charged over a distance of about 150 yards and completely routed about 300 of the enemy who were in line and in a position that could only be carried by a frontal attack.

== See also ==
- List of Medal of Honor recipients
