= Herbert H. Burr =

United States Army Medal of Honor recipient (1920–1990)

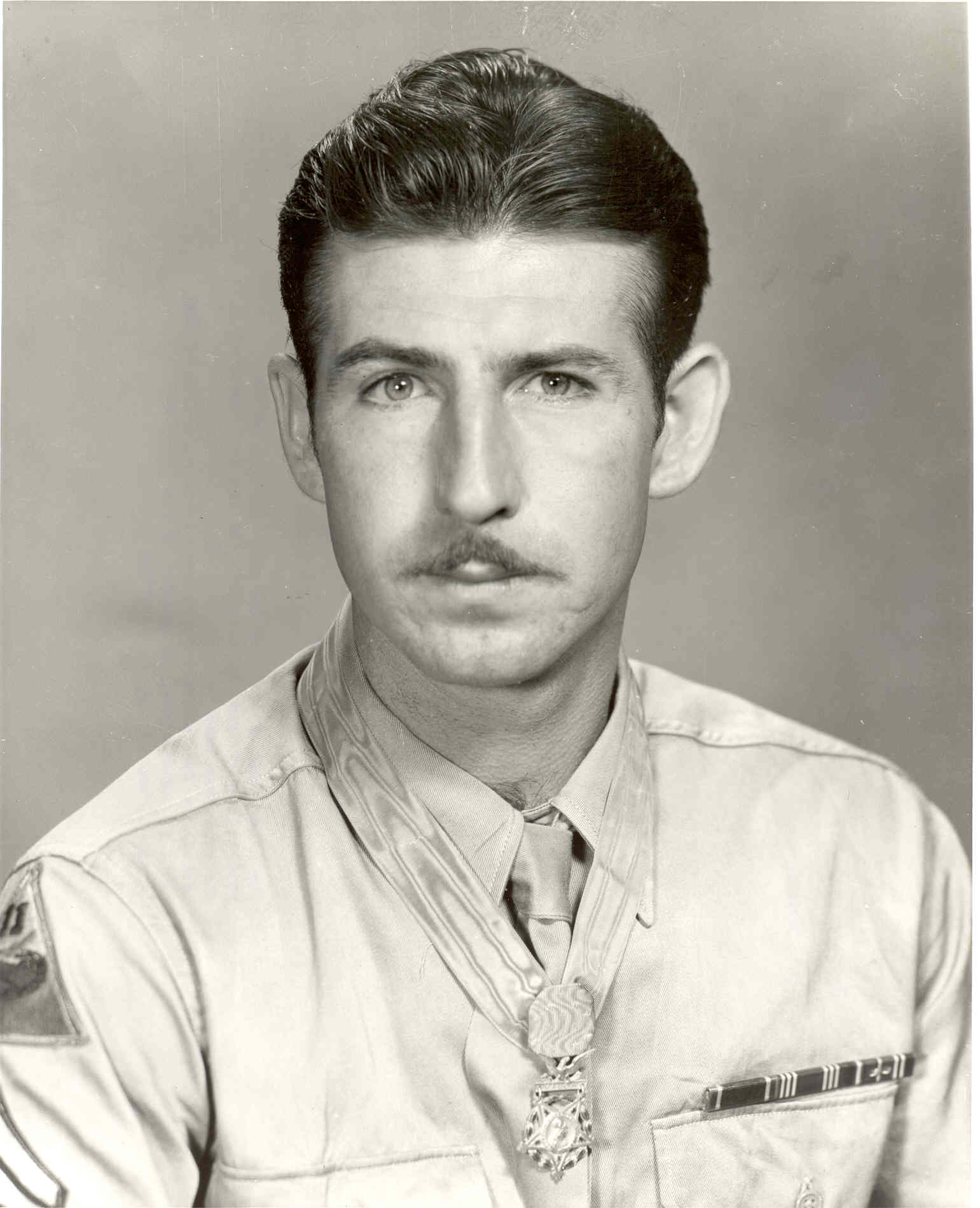
- Herbert H. Burr, Congressional Medal of Honor Society
- Born: September 13, 1920; Saint Joseph, Missouri, US
- Died: February 8, 1990 (aged 69); Urbana, Missouri, US
- Burial place: Mount Washington Cemetery, Independence, Missouri
- Military career
- Allegiance: United States of America
- Branch: United States Army
- Rank: Staff Sergeant
- Units: 41st Tank Battalion, 11th Armored Division
- Conflicts: World War II
- Awards: Medal of Honor; Distinguished Service Cross

Herbert H. Burr (September 13, 1920 – February 8, 1990) was a United States Army soldier and a recipient of the United States military's two highest decorations—the Medal of Honor and the Distinguished Service Cross—for his actions in World War II.

== Biography ==
Burr joined the Army from Kansas City, Missouri, and by March 19, 1945, was serving as a staff sergeant in Company C, 41st Tank Battalion, 11th Armored Division. On that day, near the town of Dörrmoschel, Germany, he was a gunner in a tank when the vehicle was hit by enemy fire, forcing all crew members except himself to bail out. Burr then took over the driver's seat and completed the assigned mission of reconnoitering a road in the town. Upon encountering a German artillery gun, he drove directly towards it and ran it over, destroying the gun and scattering its crew. After returning to friendly lines and dismounting from the tank, he braved hostile fire to bring medical aid to a wounded comrade. For these actions, he was awarded the Medal of Honor five months later, on August 30, 1945.

Burr left the Army while still a staff sergeant. He died at age 69 and was buried in Mount Washington Cemetery, Independence, Missouri.

== Medal of Honor citation ==
Staff Sergeant Burr's official Medal of Honor citation reads:

He displayed conspicuous gallantry during action when the tank in which he was bow gunner was hit by an enemy rocket, which severely wounded the platoon sergeant and forced the remainder of the crew to abandon the vehicle. Deafened, but otherwise unhurt, S/Sgt. Burr immediately climbed into the driver's seat and continued on the mission of entering the town to reconnoiter road conditions. As he rounded a turn he encountered an 88-mm. antitank gun at pointblank range. Realizing that he had no crew, no one to man the tank's guns, he heroically chose to disregard his personal safety in a direct charge on the German weapon. At considerable speed he headed straight for the loaded gun, which was fully manned by enemy troops who had only to pull the lanyard to send a shell into his vehicle. So unexpected and daring was his assault that he was able to drive his tank completely over the gun, demolishing it and causing its crew to flee in confusion. He then skillfully sideswiped a large truck, overturned it, and wheeling his lumbering vehicle, returned to his company. When medical personnel who had been summoned to treat the wounded sergeant could not locate him, the valiant soldier ran through a hail of sniper fire to direct them to his stricken comrade. The bold, fearless determination of S/Sgt. Burr, his skill and courageous devotion to duty, resulted in the completion of his mission in the face of seemingly impossible odds.

== See also ==
- List of Medal of Honor recipients
- List of Medal of Honor recipients for World War II
