= List of Medal of Honor recipients for World War II =

This is a list of Medal of Honor recipients for World War II. The Medal of Honor was created during the American Civil War and is the highest military decoration presented by the United States government to a member of its armed forces. The recipient must have distinguished themselves at the risk of their own life above and beyond the call of duty in action against an "enemy of the United States" or an "opposing foreign force". Due to the nature of this medal, it is commonly presented posthumously.

World War II, or the Second World War, was a global military conflict, the joining of what had initially been two separate conflicts. The first began in Asia in 1937 as the Second Sino-Japanese War; the other began in Europe in 1939 with the German and Soviet invasion of Poland. This global conflict split the majority of the world's nations into two opposing military alliances: the Allies and the Axis powers.

The United States was drawn into World War II on December 8, 1941, a day after the Axis-member Japan launched a surprise attack on Pearl Harbor in Honolulu that killed almost 2,500 people in what was considered the biggest peacetime loss on American soil inflicted by foreign people at that time.

For actions during World War II, 472 United States military personnel received the Medal of Honor. Seventeen of these were Japanese-Americans fighting in both Europe and the Pacific, many of which were upgraded from Distinguished Service Crosses during the Clinton administration. Additionally, Douglas Albert Munro was the only serviceman from the United States Coast Guard in United States military history to receive the Medal for his actions during the war.

The earliest action for which a U.S. serviceman earned a World War II Medal of Honor was the attack on Pearl Harbor, for which 17 U.S. servicemen were awarded a Medal, although they did so "while engaged in military operations involving conflict with an opposing foreign force" rather than "enemy" since the United States was neutral during the events of December 7, 1941. The last action to earn a contemporaneous Medal of Honor prior to the August 15, 1945, end of hostilities in World War II, were those of Melvin Mayfield, on July 29, 1945 – though several honorees may have been cited for their Medal after Mayfield's recognition on May 31, 1946. Additionally, seven African-American and twenty-two Asian-American soldiers who had received the Distinguished Service Cross during the war were awarded the Medal of Honor in 1997 and 2000 – most of them posthumously – after two studies determined that racial discrimination had caused them to be overlooked at the time.

== A ==
This along with the † indicates that the Medal of Honor was awarded posthumously

Image	Name	Service	Rank	Place of action	Date of action	Notes
	Lucian Adams	Army	Staff Sergeant	near St. Dié, France	October 28, 1944	Personally killed 9 Germans, eliminated 3 enemy machine guns, vanquished a specialized force which was armed with automatic weapons and grenade launchers, cleared the woods of hostile elements, and reopened the severed supply lines to the assault companies of his battalion.
Head of a young man in military uniform with a quizzical look on his face. His garrison cap is tilted off to one side and a tuft of short hair sticks out from the other.	Harold C. Agerholm †	Marine Corps	Private First Class	Saipan, Mariana Islands	July 7, 1944	For single-handedly evacuating approximately 45 casualties under heavy rifle and mortar fire.
	Beauford T. Anderson	Army	Technical Sergeant	Okinawa, Ryukyu Islands	April 13, 1945	Risked his life to save several of his fellow soldiers and repel an enemy attack single-handedly.
Head of a young man in a military jacket and tie, looking down and to the right	Richard B. Anderson †	Marine Corps	Private First Class	Roi Island, Kwajalein Atoll, Marshall Islands	February 1, 1944	In a shell crater, Richard B. Anderson hurled his body upon a grenade to save his companions, taking the full impact of the explosion.
	Sylvester Antolak †	Army	Sergeant	near Cisterna di Littoria, Italy	May 24, 1944	Near Cisterna di Littoria, Italy, he charged 200 yards over flat, coverless terrain to destroy an enemy machine gun nest during the second day of the offensive which broke through the German cordon of steel around the Anzio beachhead.
Head of a middle-aged man wearing a light-colored jacket with stripes and a star on shoulderboards, a dark colored tie, and a peaked cap with decorative leaves on the visor.	Richard N. Antrim	Navy	Lieutenant	Makassar, Celebes, Netherlands East Indies	April 1942	During the early part of his imprisonment at Makassar in April 1942, he saw a Japanese guard brutally beating a fellow prisoner of war and successfully intervened, at great risk to his own life. For his conspicuous act of valor, Antrim later received the Medal of Honor.
Man looking at the camera.	Thomas E. Atkins	Army	Private First Class	Villa Verde Trail, Luzon, Philippines	March 10, 1945	Remained in his fox hole for 4 hours bearing the brunt of each enemy assault and maintaining fire until each charge was repulsed.

== B ==
This along with the † indicates that the Medal of Honor was awarded posthumously

Image	Name	Service	Rank	Place of action	Date of action	Notes
Head of a young white man with neatly combed dark hair in a military jacket with a strap diagonally across the chest and badges pinned to his left breast	Kenneth D. Bailey †	Marine Corps	Major	Henderson Field, Guadalcanal, Solomon Islands	September 12, 1942 – September 13, 1942	For repelling enemy offensive maneuvers, holding the main line and upholding friendly morale while sustaining fire from superior enemy forces despite a severe head wound.
Profile of a white man leaning forward with a large phone handset pressed to his ear. He is wearing a leather jacket over a shirt and tie.	Addison E. Baker †	Air Forces	Lieutenant Colonel	over Ploiești, Romania (Operation Tidal Wave)	August 1, 1943	For conspicuous gallantry and intrepidity above and beyond the call of duty in action with the enemy on August 1, 1943. On this date he led his command, the 93d Heavy Bombardment Group, on a daring low-level attack against enemy oil refineries and installations at Ploiești, Romania.
Portrait of a white man in a military uniform looking off to his left and smiling.	Thomas A. Baker †	Army	Private	Saipan, Mariana Islands	June 19, 1944 – July 7, 1944	On Saipan in the Mariana Islands, he advanced ahead of his unit with a bazooka and destroyed a Japanese emplacement which was firing on his company. Several days later, he single-handedly attacked and killed two groups of Japanese soldiers. On July 7, Baker's position came under attack by a large Japanese force. Although seriously wounded early in the attack, he refused to be evacuated and continued to fight in the close-range battle until running out of ammunition. When a comrade was wounded while trying to carry him to safety, Baker insisted that he be left behind. At his request, his comrades left him propped against a tree and gave him a M1911 pistol, which had eight bullets remaining. When American forces retook the position, they found the pistol, now empty, and eight dead Japanese soldiers around Baker's body.
Head and shoulders of a black man with full cheeks in military uniform. Rows of ribbon bars are on his left breast and his lapels and garrison cap are adorned with pins and badges.	Vernon J. Baker	Army	Second Lieutenant	near Viareggio, Italy	April 5, 1945 – April 6, 1945	Demonstrated outstanding courage and leadership in destroying enemy installations, personnel and equipment during his company's attack against a strongly entrenched enemy in mountainous terrain. One of seven African-American soldiers who received their medals belatedly, after a 1993 study revealed discrimination that caused them to be overlooked at the time.
Color photo of Barfoot wearing his Medal of Honor and a blue suit. He is facing the camera and smiling.	Van T. Barfoot	Army	Technical Sergeant	near Carano, Italy	May 23, 1944	"With his platoon heavily engaged during an assault against forces well entrenched on commanding ground, 2d Lt. Barfoot (then Tech. Sgt.) moved off alone upon the enemy left flank. He crawled to the proximity of 1 machine gun nest and made a direct hit on it with a hand grenade, killing 2 and wounding 3 Germans. He continued along the German defense line to another machine gun emplacement, and with his tommygun killed 2 and captured 3 soldiers. Members of another enemy machine gun crew then abandoned their position and gave themselves up to Sgt. Barfoot. Leaving the prisoners for his support squad to pick up, he proceeded to mop up positions in the immediate area, capturing more prisoners and bringing his total count to 17. Later that day, after he had reorganized his men and consolidated the newly captured ground, the enemy launched a fierce armored counterattack directly at his platoon positions. Securing a bazooka, Sgt. Barfoot took up an exposed position directly in front of 3 advancing Mark VI tanks. From a distance of 75 yards his first shot destroyed the track of the leading tank, effectively disabling it, while the other 2 changed direction toward the flank. As the crew of the disabled tank dismounted, Sgt. Barfoot killed 3 of them with his tommygun. He continued onward into enemy terrain and destroyed a recently abandoned German fieldpiece with a demolition charge placed in the breech. While returning to his platoon position, Sgt. Barfoot, though greatly fatigued by his Herculean efforts, assisted 2 of his seriously wounded men 1,700 yards to a position of safety. Sgt. Barfoot's extraordinary heroism, demonstration of magnificent valor, and aggressive determination in the face of pointblank fire are a perpetual inspiration to his fellow soldiers."
photo of Barrett holding MoH box.	Carlton W. Barrett	Army	Private	near St. Laurent-sur-Mer, France	June 6, 1944	Joined the United States Army in Albany, New York, he was a member of, 18th Infantry, 1st Infantry Division. Barrett was one of four Medal of Honor recipients on D-Day, June 6, 1944.
Head of a young white man in a plain dark jacket with a star-shaped medal hanging from a ribbon around his neck. His garrison cap is tilted to the side and has a single round pin on its side.	John Basilone	Marine Corps	Sergeant	Lunga area, Guadalcanal, Solomon Islands	October 24, 1942 – October 25, 1942	On the night of October 24–25, 1942 his unit engaged the Japanese in the Lunga area when their position came under attack by a regiment of approximately 3,000 soldiers. The Japanese forces began a frontal attack using machine guns, grenades and mortars against the American heavy machine guns. Basilone commanded two sections of machine guns that fought for the next 48 hours until only Basilone and two other men were still able to continue fighting. Basilone moved an extra gun into position and maintained continual fire against the incoming Japanese forces. He repaired another machine-gun and personally manned it, holding the defensive line until replacements arrived. With the continuous fighting, ammunition became critically low and supply lines were cut off. Basilone fought through hostile lines and returned with urgently needed ammunition for his gunners. He was killed on Iwo Jima on February 19, 1945. He was the first Enlisted Marine to receive The Medal of Honor, Purple Heart, and Navy Cross.
Head and torso of a white man sitting with his right arm resting on something in front of him. He is wearing a military uniform with a wide belt, a strap diagonally across the chest, and a peaked cap.	Harold W. Bauer †	Marine Corps	Lieutenant Colonel	South Pacific area	May 10, 1942 – November 14, 1942	For extraordinary heroism and conspicuous courage as Squadron Commander of Marine Fighting Squadron TWO TWELVE in the South Pacific Area during the period May 10 to November 14, 1942.
Head of a half-smiling white man wearing a shirt and tie and a garrison cap tilted over his right ear.	Lewis K. Bausell †	Marine Corps	Corporal	Peleliu Island, Palau Group	September 15, 1944	During combat at Peleliu, he covered an exploding Japanese hand grenade in order to protect his comrades, and died of his wounds three days later. Bausell was the only enlisted Marine from the Nation's capital, Washington, D.C. to be awarded the Medal of Honor for actions during World War II.
	Raymond O. Beaudoin †	Army	First Lieutenant	Hamelin, Germany	April 6, 1945	By his intrepidity, great fighting skill, and supreme devotion to his responsibility for the well-being of his platoon, 1st Lt. Beaudoin single-handedly accomplished a mission that enabled a messenger to secure help which saved the stricken unit and made possible the decisive defeat of the German forces.
	Bernard P. Bell	Army	Technical Sergeant	Mittelwihr, France	December 18, 1944	By his intrepidity and bold, aggressive leadership, T/Sgt. Bell enabled his 8-man squad to drive back approximately 150 of the enemy, killing at least 87 and capturing 42. Personally, he killed more than 20 and captured 33 prisoners.
—	Stanley Bender	Army	Staff Sergeant	near La Londe les maures, France	August 17, 1944	He had sparked and led the assault company in an attack which overwhelmed the enemy, destroying a roadblock, taking a town, seizing intact 3 bridges over the Maravenne River, and capturing commanding terrain which dominated the area.
—	George Benjamin Jr. †	Army	Private First Class	Leyte, Philippines	December 21, 1944	He was severely wounded while leading an assault against a strongly defended Japanese position on the island of Leyte. After being evacuated to an aid station, he conveyed valuable information regarding the disposition of the Japanese emplacement to his superiors.
—	Edward A. Bennett	Army	Corporal	Heckhuscheid, Germany	February 1, 1945	The fearless initiative, stalwart combat ability, and outstanding gallantry of Cpl. Bennett eliminated the enemy fire which was decimating his company's ranks and made it possible for the Americans to sweep all resistance from the town.
Head of a middle-aged white man with thinning hair, wearing a dark suit coat, white shirt, and dark tie.	Mervyn S. Bennion †	Navy	Captain	West Virginia, Pearl Harbor	December 7, 1941	While mortally wounded, he remained in command of his ship. For conspicuous devotion to duty, extraordinary courage, and complete disregard of his own life, he was awarded the Medal of Honor.
Head and shoulders of a white man wearing a light colored shirt and tie and a peaked cap with a dark visor.	Charles J. Berry †	Marine Corps	Corporal	Iwo Jima, Volcano Islands	March 3, 1945	He landed on Iwo Jima on D-Day, February 19, 1945, and was killed in action on March 3, 1945, during the action which earned him the Medal of Honor.
Man with smile and glasses looking to the side	Vito R. Bertoldo	Army	Master Sergeant	Hatten, France	January 9, 1945 – January 10, 1945	In Hatten, France, he manned a machine gun in defense of a command post being attacked by a numerically superior German force. When evacuation became necessary, he voluntarily stayed behind to cover the withdrawal. The next morning he moved to another command post, and again defended it against a continued assault by strong German forces and voluntarily covered the withdrawal of friendly forces when the post was abandoned. For these actions, he was awarded the Medal of Honor one year later, on January 10, 1946.
	Arthur O. Beyer	Army	Corporal	near Arloncourt, Belgium	January 15, 1945	Near Arloncourt, Belgium, he used hand grenades and his carbine to single-handedly destroy two German machine gun positions before working his way through a honey-combed series of enemy foxholes—killing and capturing German soldiers as he went. For these actions, he was awarded the Medal of Honor by President Harry Truman seven months later, on August 30, 1945.
Head and torso of a smirking white man wearing a peaked cap and a military jacket, adorned with pins and badges and a strap running diagonally across his chest, over a shirt and tie.	Willibald C. Bianchi †	Army	First Lieutenant	near Bagac, Bataan Province, Philippines	February 3, 1942	After the action near Bagac in the Bataan Province, Bianchi was among the troops captured by the Japanese at the fall of Bataan, on April 9, 1942. He was part of the Bataan "Death March," and was imprisoned in several Japanese prisoner of war camps, enduring horrible conditions. He was known for his compassion and efforts to better the lot of his fellow prisoners by bartering with their captors for extra food and medicine. On January 9, 1945, while imprisoned in an unmarked Japanese prison ship, Bianchi was killed instantly when an American plane, unaware that the ship contained American prisoners, dropped a 1,000-pound bomb in the cargo hold.
—	Melvin E. Biddle	Army	Private First Class	near Soy, Belgium	December 23, 1944 – December 24, 1944	When presenting the medal to Biddle, Truman whispered "People don't believe me when I tell them that I'd rather have one of these than be President." Biddle was decorated with 17 other soldiers that served in the Eastern Theater of Operations.
Head and shoulders of a smiling young white man wearing a naval uniform consisting of a white shirt with a dark scarf tied around the neck and running under the large, flat, collar, and a white "Dixie Cup" hat.	Elmer C. Bigelow †	Navy	Watertender First Class	USS Fletcher, off Corregidor Island, Philippines	February 14, 1945	While assisting minesweeping operations prior to landings on Manila Bay's Corregidor Island, Fletcher was hit by an enemy shell penetrated the No. 1 gun magazine, igniting several powder cases. Bigelow picked up a pair of fire extinguishers and rushed below in a resolute attempt to quell the raging flames. Refusing to waste the precious time required to don rescue-breathing apparatus, Bigelow plunged through the blinding smoke billowing out of the magazine hatch and dropped into the blazing compartment. Despite the acrid, burning powder smoke which seared his lungs, he succeeded in quickly extinguishing the fires and in cooling the cases and bulkheads, thereby preventing further damage to the ship. However Bigelow was badly injured and succumbed to his injuries the following day.
man looking to the camera in army uniform with serious face.	Arnold L. Bjorklund	Army	First Lieutenant	near Altavilla, Italy	September 13, 1943	Near Altavilla, Italy, he single-handedly attacked and destroyed two German machine gun emplacements and a mortar position.
—	Orville E. Bloch	Army	First Lieutenant	near Firenzuola, Italy	September 22, 1944	Near Firenzuola, Italy, he led three soldiers in an attack on enemy positions which resulted in the capture of nineteen prisoners and the silencing of five machine gun nests.
	Paul L. Bolden	Army	Staff Sergeant	Petit-Coo, Belgium	December 23, 1944	While his comrade provided covering fire from across the street, Bolden tossed grenades through a window, rushed to the door, and began firing. Wounded by the greatly superior number of German soldiers inside, he retreated from the house. Realizing that the Germans would not surrender, he returned to the house despite his serious wounds and killed the remaining soldiers. For these actions, he was awarded the Medal of Honor eight months later, on August 30, 1945.
Head and shoulders of a stern-faced white man. A row of ribbon bars are on his left breast as is the Combat Infantryman's Badge and the star-shaped Medal of Honor hangs from a ribbon around his neck.	Cecil H. Bolton	Army	First Lieutenant	Mark River, Holland	November 2, 1944	After being severely wounded in the legs and rendered unconsciousness from a German shell, he advanced voluntarily towards several enemy emplacements and led his team through intense enemy fire, and eliminated several machine gunners and an 88-mm. artillery piece.
Head and shoulders of a stern-faced white man with his arms folded over his military jacket, standing in front of a wall map and an American flag. Rows of ribbon bars are on his left breast, pins adorn his lapels, and a star-shaped medal hangs from a ribbon around his neck.	Richard I. Bong	Air Forces	Major	over Borneo and Leyte	October 10, 1944 – November 15, 1944	Fighter pilot in the Pacific theater shot down at least 40 Japanese aircraft, making him America's top ace.
Head and shoulders of a young white man wearing a garrison cap and a plain military jacket over a shirt and tie	Alexander Bonnyman Jr. †	Marine Corps	First Lieutenant	Betio Island, Tarawa Atoll, Gilbert Islands	November 20, 1943 – November 22, 1943	During a counterattack at the far end of Betio Pier, he directed and reorganized his pioneer party after suffering heavy bombardment, and directed the blowing of several hostile installations. Alexander Bonnyman Jr. then led his party into a renewed assault, effectively taking over a heavily fortified enemy emplacement, resulting in, approximately, 150 hostile troops being killed.
—	Robert D. Booker †	Army	Private	near Fondouk, Tunisia	April 9, 1943	While engaged in action against the enemy, he ran 200 yards of open ground with a machine gun and a box of ammunition, while under heavy fire from hostile machine gunners, mortar and artillery.
Head of a white man in a military jacket with dark hair, short on the sides and slightly longer, and ruffled, on top.	William J. Bordelon †	Marine Corps	Staff Sergeant	Betio Island, Tarawa Atoll, Gilbert Islands	November 20, 1943	Surviving a counterattack and sustaining heavy fire, William J. Bordelon attacked several enemy emplacements with demolitions and disregarded his own serious condition in order to rescue and aid two of his men.
—	George W. G. Boyce Jr. †	Army	Second Lieutenant	near Afua, New Guinea	July 23, 1944	After being ambushed by superior enemy forces, he was planning a tactical maneuver with his platoon. During this planning, a hand grenade fell in between him and his men, and he promptly threw himself upon the grenade to save his men.
Head of a squinting man wearing a shirt unbuttoned at the collar and a cloth aviator's cap with headphones built into the ear flaps, an unbuckled chin strap, and goggles pushed up onto his forehead.	Pappy Boyington	Marine Corps	Major	Central Solomons area	September 12, 1943 – January 3, 1944	Fighter pilot with 26 victories.
	Herschel F. Briles	Army	Staff Sergeant	near Scherpenseel, Germany	November 20, 1944	With a comrade at his side, Herschel left his vehicle and rescued 2 critically wounded soldiers from a burning destroyer and extinguished the fire, which had been hit by an artillery shell near Scherpenseel, Germany, on November 20, 1944. The next morning, he forced 55 Germans to surrender, armed with only a machine gun, allowing fellow Americans to pass through the junction the Nazis occupied. Later that day, another destroyer was hit by a concealed enemy tank, where he again rescued 2 allies from the wreckage with the help of a fellow soldier.
—	Maurice L. Britt	Army	First Lieutenant	North of Mignano, Italy	November 10, 1943	Played football for the Detroit Lions, later Lieutenant Governor of Arkansas.
	Leonard C. Brostrom †	Army	Private First Class	near Dagami, Leyte, Philippines	October 28, 1944	During an ambush, his platoon sustained heavy fire from well-camouflaged emplacements which resulted in severe casualties. After noticing a weak point in the enemy fortification, Leonard C. Brostrom charged without hesitation to flush out the enemies. During this, he was a prime target and was killed in action, but his company managed to reorganize and assault the enemy.
—	Bobbie E. Brown	Army	Captain	Crucifix Hill, Aachen, Germany	October 8, 1944	
Head and torso of an elderly white man, in front of an American flag, with his hands folded and resting on a table in front of him. He is wearing a white jacket with a row of medals hanging from ribbons and a winged pin on his left breast, gold shoulder-boards, and a star-shaped medal hanging from a light blue ribbon around his neck. His peaked cap is white with a black visor decorated with gold leaves, a gold band around the brim, and an eagle-anchors-and-shield emblem on the front.	John D. Bulkeley	Navy	Lieutenant Commander	Philippine waters	December 7, 1941 – April 10, 1942	
—	Frank Burke	Army	First Lieutenant	Nuremberg, Germany	April 17, 1945	Also known as Francis X. Burke.
—	Elmer J. Burr †	Army	First Sergeant	Buna, New Guinea	December 24, 1942	For smothering a grenade with his body, sacrificing himself to save others around him.
Man in army uniform and mustache looking at camera wearing medal of honor.	Herbert H. Burr	Army	Staff Sergeant	near Dorrmoschel, Germany	March 19, 1945	He was awarded the Medal of Honor for not bailing on his mission and single-handedly destroying an 88mm anti-tank turret by driving a damaged tank over top of the gun. He also continued to destroy a German truck and directed medics to his injured men on foot while running through sniper fire.
	James M. Burt	Army	Captain	near Wurselen, Germany	October 13, 1944	Commanded an infantry-tank attack while exposed to enemy fire, as well as ran through 75 yards through heavy fire to assist the infantry battalion commander who was seriously wounded.
Head and torso of a young white man with neatly combed hair wearing a dark military jacket with a wide belt and a few ribbon bars on the left breast. A star-shaped medal hangs from a ribbon around his neck.	Richard E. Bush	Marine Corps	Corporal	Mount Yaedake, Okinawa, Ryukyu Islands	April 16, 1945	Bush was a Squad Leader serving with the First Battalion, Fourth Marines, Sixth Marine Division, in action against Japanese forces during the final assault against Mt. Yaetake on Okinawa. He led his troops up the rocky precipice, over the ridge and drove out defending Japanese troops. He fought relentlessly in the forefront of the attack until being evacuated due to his wounds. Although prostrate under medical treatment when a Japanese grenade landed in the midst of his group, he pulled it into his body, taking the full force of the blast and saving the lives of his fellow marines. He was one of the four surviving marines who shielded grenades with their bodies during World War II.
Profile of a young white man wearing a white sailor's cap and a dark sailor suit. A star-shaped medal hangs from a wide ribbon around his neck.	Robert E. Bush	Navy	Hospital Apprentice First class	Okinawa, Ryukyu Islands	May 2, 1945	Hospital Corpsman serving with Marines.
John E. Butts	John E. Butts †	Army	Second Lieutenant	Normandy, France	June 14, 1944, June 16, 1944, and June 23, 1944	Butts served with the U.S. Army, E Company, 60th Infantry Regiment, 2nd Battalion, 9th Infantry Division during the invasion of France in 1944. He was severely wounded on three occasions and continued leading his men until June 23 when he was killed. He was 21 years of age.

== C ==
This along with the † indicates that the Medal of Honor was awarded posthumously

Image	Name	Service	Rank	Place of action	Date of action	Notes
Head and shoulders of a young white man wearing a military jacket with a single cross-shaped pin on the left breast, one stripe on the upper sleeve, and a peaked cap with an eagle-globe-and-anchor emblem on the front.	William R. Caddy †	Marine Corps	Private First Class	Iwo Jima, Volcano Islands	March 3, 1945	Sacrificed his life by smothering a grenade with his body in order to save the lives of his platoon leader and platoon sergeant
Head and shoulders of a man in a white jacket with black shoulderboards with binoculars hanging from around his neck. His eyes are shaded by a white peaked cap with a black visor.	Daniel J. Callaghan †	Navy	Rear Admiral	Naval Battle of Guadalcanal, Savo Sound, Solomon Islands	November 12, 1942 – November 13, 1942	He was awarded the Medal of Honor for his ship's part in taking back the Solomon Islands from the Japanese. His heavy cruiser, the San Francisco, along with three light cruisers and another heavy cruiser drove the Japanese out of the area. This alongside the Battle of Midway was a major turning point for the Allied Forces.
	Jose Calugas	Army	Sergeant	Culis, Bataan Province, Philippines	January 16, 1942	He was born in Leon, Iloilo, Philippines to Filipino parents. Organized a squad of volunteers to man an artillery position under heavy fire. Received a direct commission and became a United States citizen. Retiring from the Army, he settled in Tacoma, Washington.
Head and shoulders of a young white man with wavy, neatly combed, hair wearing a dark jacket with large bright buttons, a high stiff collar, a strap laying diagonally across the chest, and two pins on his left breast.	George H. Cannon †	Marine Corps	First Lieutenant	Sand Island, Midway Atoll	December 7, 1941	Refused to be evacuated from his post until after his men, who had been wounded by the same shell that wounded him, were evacuated, and directed the reorganization of his Command Post until forcibly removed.
	Pedro Cano †	Army	Private	Schevenhütte, Germany	December 2, 1944 – December 3, 1944	Repeatedly risked his life destroying enemy machine gun positions using rockets and grenades, in support of his own and adjacent infantry company
—	Alvin P. Carey †	Army	Staff Sergeant	near Plougastel, Brittany, France	August 23, 1944	Mortally wounded while single-handedly attacking an enemy pillbox
—	Charles F. Carey Jr. †	Army	Technical Sergeant	Rimling, France	January 8, 1945 – January 9, 1945	
Man with army uniform looking to the side with MOH.	Chris Carr	Army	Sergeant	near Guignola, Italy	October 1, 1944 – October 2, 1944	
Head and shoulders of a man wearing a peaked cap and a military jacket with a winged pin on the left breast and pins on the lapels.	Horace S. Carswell Jr. †	Air Forces	Major	over the South China Sea	October 26, 1944	Assigned to the 14th USAAF in China, Carswell was flying a B-24 Liberator on the night of October 26, 1944, on a single-aircraft mission against a Japanese convoy in the South China Sea. He elected to make a second low-level run over a thoroughly alerted convoy and scored two direct hits on a large tanker. His co-pilot was wounded, and his aircraft had two engines knocked out, a third damaged, the hydraulic system damaged, and a fuel tank punctured. He managed to gain enough altitude to reach land, where he ordered the crew to bail out. Eight did, but the bombardier's parachute was too badly damaged to use. Instead of bailing out, Carswell stayed with the bombardier and the wounded co-pilot, and attempted a crash landing. The badly damaged aircraft crashed against a mountain, and all three aboard were killed.
Head and shoulders of a black man, with a carefully trimmed mustache, standing erect and staring directly into the camera. He is wearing a peaked cap and a jacket with three rows of ribbon bars and a pin on the left breast, pins on the lapels, and a braided cord over the left shoulder.	Edward A. Carter Jr.	Army	Staff Sergeant	near Speyer, Germany	March 23, 1945	One of seven African-American soldiers who received their medals belatedly, after a 1993 study revealed discrimination that caused them to be overlooked at the time. Carter served with an armored infantry unit of the Seventh Army Infantry Company Number 1 (Provisional), a unit manned by volunteers and used to support depleted divisions following the Battle of the Bulge. On March 23, 1945, Carter engaged the enemy when the tank he was riding on was hit by bazooka fire. Forced to dismount, he led three soldiers across an open field. In the process, two of the men were killed and the other seriously wounded. Carter continued alone and was wounded five times before being forced to take cover. Eight German soldiers tried to capture him, but he killed six of them and captured the remaining two as prisoners.
—	Anthony Casamento	Marine Corps	Corporal	Guadalcanal, Solomon Islands	November 1, 1942	When all members of his machine gun squad were killed or severely wounded, he continued to man a machine gun, single-handedly holding off a large Japanese force despite multiple wounds himself. He was belatedly awarded the Medal of Honor in 1980.
Man with army uniform looking off to the side.	Frederick W. Castle †	Air Forces	Brigadier General	Germany	December 24, 1944	
Head and shoulders of a middle-aged white man with a round face wearing a garrison cap and a jacket with four rows of ribbon bars on the left breast and pins on both the lapels and on the collar of the undershirt.	Justice M. Chambers	Marine Corps	Lieutenant Colonel	Iwo Jima, Volcano Islands	February 19, 1945 – February 22, 1945	Led the 8-hour battle to carry the flanking ridge top and reduce the enemy's fields of aimed fire, thus protecting the vital foothold gained
Man with army uniform looking at camera with hat.	Ralph Cheli †	Air Forces	Major	near Wewak, New Guinea	August 18, 1943	
—	Ernest Childers	Army	Second Lieutenant	Oliveto, Italy	September 22, 1943	
older man looking to the side.	Clyde L. Choate	Army	Staff Sergeant	near Bruyeres, France	October 25, 1944	
Man with army uniform looking off to the side camera with hat tilted.	Dale E. Christensen †	Army	Second Lieutenant	Driniumor River, New Guinea	July 16, 1944 – July 19, 1944	For conspicuous gallantry and intrepidity at the risk of his life above and beyond the call of duty along the Driniumor River, New Guinea, from 16 – July 19, 1944. 2d Lt. Christensen repeatedly distinguished himself by conspicuous gallantry above and beyond the call of duty in the continuous heavy fighting which occurred in this area from 16 – July 19,. On July 16, his platoon engaged in a savage fire fight in which much damage was caused by 1 enemy machine gun effectively placed. 2d Lt. Christensen ordered his men to remain under cover, crept forward under fire, and at a range of 15 yards put the gun out of action with hand grenades. Again, on July 19, while attacking an enemy position strong in mortars and machine guns, his platoon was pinned to the ground by intense fire. Ordering his men to remain under cover, he crept forward alone to locate definitely the enemy automatic weapons and the best direction from which to attack. Although his rifle was struck by enemy fire and knocked from his hands he continued his reconnaissance, located 5 enemy machine guns, destroyed 1 with hand grenades, and rejoined his platoon. He then led his men to the point selected for launching the attack and, calling encouragement, led the charge. This assault was successful and the enemy was driven from the positions with a loss of 4 mortars and 10 machine guns and leaving many dead on the field. On August 4, 1944, near Afua, Dutch New Guinea, 2d Lt. Christensen was killed in action about 2 yards from his objective while leading his platoon in an attack on an enemy machine gun position. 2d Lt. Christensen's leadership, intrepidity, and repeatedly demonstrated gallantry in action at the risk of his life, above and beyond the call of duty, exemplify the highest traditions of the U.S. Armed Forces.
Man with army uniform looking at camera smiling.	Herbert F. Christian †	Army	Private	near Valmontone, Italy	June 2, 1944 – June 3, 1944	
—	Joseph J. Cicchetti †	Army	Private First Class	South Manila, Luzon, Philippines	February 9, 1945	
—	Francis J. Clark	Army	Technical Sergeant	near Kalborn, Luxembourg and near Sevenig, Germany	September 12, 1944 and September 17, 1944	
Head and shoulders of an elderly white man wearing glasses and a baseball cap with an image of a star-shaped medal and the words "Medal of Honor recipient". An actual star-shaped medal hangs from a light blue ribbon around his neck, over his dark suit coat and patterned tie.	Mike Colalillo	Army	Private First Class	near Untergriesheim, Germany	April 7, 1945	
Head and shoulders of a young white man with a broad smile. He is wearing a garrison cap tilted over his right ear and a plain military jacket on top of a shirt and tie.	Darrell S. Cole †	Marine Corps	Sergeant	Iwo Jima, Volcano Islands	February 19, 1945	Namesake of USS Cole (DDG-67).
Head and shoulders of a white man wearing a metal helmet with an oak leaf emblem on the front, the chin strap unbuckled and hanging loose, and a dark, heavy coat.	Robert G. Cole †	Army	Lieutenant Colonel	near Carentan, France	June 11, 1944	For leading a charge across a field swept by German machine guns and artillery.
—	Garlin Murl Conner	Army	First Lieutenant	Houssen, France	January 24, 1945	For directing artillery fire for three hours against a German advance that came so close he directed fire on his own position.
—	James P. Connor	Army	Sergeant	Cape Cavalaire, southern France	August 15, 1944	
—	Raymond H. Cooley	Army	Staff Sergeant	near Lumboy, Luzon, Philippines	February 24, 1945	
	Charles H. Coolidge	Army	Technical Sergeant	East of Belmont sur Buttant, France	October 24, 1944 – October 27, 1944	Leading a section of heavy machine guns supported by 1 platoon of Company K, he took a position near Hill 623, east of Belmont sur Buttant, France, on October 24, 1944, with the mission of covering the right flank of the 3d Battalion and supporting its action. T/Sgt. Coolidge went forward with a Sergeant of Company K to reconnoiter positions for coordinating the fires of the light and heavy machine guns. They ran into an enemy force in the woods estimated to be an infantry company. T/Sgt. Coolidge, attempting to bluff the Germans by a show of assurance and boldness called upon them to surrender, whereupon the enemy opened fire. With his carbine, T/Sgt. Coolidge wounded 2 of them. There being no officer present with the force, T/Sgt. Coolidge at once assumed command. Many of the men were replacements recently arrived; this was their first experience under fire. T/Sgt. Coolidge, unmindful of the enemy fire delivered at close range, walked along the position, calming and encouraging his men and directing their fire. The attack was thrown back. Through 25 and October 26, the enemy launched repeated attacks against the position of this combat group but each was repulsed due to T/Sgt. Coolidge's able leadership. On October 27, German infantry, supported by 2 tanks, made a determined attack on the position. The area was swept by enemy small arms, machine gun, and tank fire. T/Sgt. Coolidge armed himself with a bazooka and advanced to within 25 yards of the tanks. His bazooka failed to function and he threw it aside. Securing all the hand grenades he could carry, he crawled forward and inflicted heavy casualties on the advancing enemy. Finally it became apparent that the enemy, in greatly superior force, supported by tanks, would overrun the position. T/Sgt. Coolidge, displaying great coolness and courage, directed and conducted an orderly withdrawal, being himself the last to leave the position. As a result of T/Sgt. Coolidge's heroic and superior leadership, the mission of this combat group was accomplished throughout 4 days of continuous fighting against numerically superior enemy troops in rain and cold and amid dense woods.
Head of a stern-faced young white man with dark hair and full cheeks wearing a dark jacket with ribbon bars of the left breast.	Henry A. Courtney Jr. †	Marine Corps	Major	Okinawa, Ryukyu Islands	May 14, 1945 – May 15, 1945	For leading his battalion in a successful night attack up a fiercely defended hill, personally killing many Japanese before he himself was killed.
	Richard E. Cowan †	Army	Private First Class	near Krinkelter Wald, Belgium	December 17, 1944	
Man with army uniform looking to the side with Medal of Honor.	Clarence B. Craft	Army	Private First Class	Hen Hill, Okinawa, Ryukyu Islands	May 31, 1945	
Man with army uniform looking at camera with tilted hat.	Robert Craig †	Army	Second Lieutenant	near Favoratta, Sicily	July 11, 1943	Single-handedly located and destroyed an Italian machine gun nest; then, when encountering superior enemy forces, ultimately chose to sacrifice himself by laying down covering fire for his entire platoon to retreat to safety.
	Morris E. Crain †	Army	Technical Sergeant	Haguenau, France	March 13, 1945	When a house defended by some of his men came under intense attack from German soldiers and a tank, he ordered the men to withdraw while he held the position alone. He was killed when the house was destroyed by German fire.
Man with army uniform looking at camera with serious face.	Demas T. Craw †	Air Forces	Colonel	near Port Lyautey, French Morocco	November 8, 1942	
Man with army uniform looking at camera.	William J. Crawford	Army	Private	near Altavilla, Italy	September 13, 1943	Listed as MIA, Crawford's MoH was originally presented posthumously to Crawford's father. Crawford was later discovered to be a PoW. President Reagan re-presented Crawford's MoH to him at the U.S. Air Force Academy Class of 1984 graduation.
—	John R. Crews	Army	Staff Sergeant	near Lobenbacherhof, Germany	April 8, 1945	
Head and shoulders of a middle aged white man wearing a white peaked cap with a black visor and a dark jacket over a white shirt and dark tie. On his left breast is a winged pin and a single ribbon bar.	John P. Cromwell †	Navy	Captain	USS Sculpin, off Truk Island	November 19, 1943	Stayed aboard a sinking submarine to prevent military secrets he possessed from falling into enemy hands.
Currey in 1945	Francis S. Currey	Army	Sergeant	Malmedy, Belgium	December 21, 1944	In Malmedy Belgium, During the Battle of the Bulge, led defense of strongpoint bridge destroying four enemy tanks and holding off infantry. Saved five injured soldiers.

== D ==
This along with the † indicates that the Medal of Honor was awarded posthumously

Image	Name	Service	Rank	Place of action	Date of action	Notes
	Edward C. Dahlgren	Army	Sergeant	Oberhoffen, France	February 11, 1945	
	Peter J. Dalessandro	Army	Technical Sergeant	near Kalterherberg, Germany	December 22, 1944	
—	Michael J. Daly	Army	First Lieutenant	Nuremberg, Germany	April 18, 1945	
Head and shoulders of a young white man wearing a peaked cap and a military jacket with large shiny buttons, two chevrons on the upper sleeves, and two medals and two ribbon bars on the left breast.	Anthony P. Damato †	Marine Corps	Corporal	Engebi Island, Eniwetok Atoll, Marshall Islands	February 19, 1944 – February 20, 1944	Sacrificed his life by smothering a grenade with his body
Head of a middle-aged white man wearing a white peaked cap, wire frame glasses, and a dark jacket over a shirt and tie.	Albert L. David	Navy	Lieutenant, Junior Grade	off French West Africa	June 4, 1944	For leading a boarding party that successfully captured the German submarine U-505.
Head of a smiling young man with dark hair wearing a military jacket with pins on the lapel over a shirt and tie.	Rudolph B. Davila	Army	Staff Sergeant	near Artena, Italy	May 28, 1944	One of 22 Asian-American soldiers who received their medals in 2000, after a study revealed discrimination that caused them to be overlooked at the time.
—	Charles W. Davis	Army	Captain	Guadalcanal, Solomon Islands	January 12, 1943	
Head and shoulders of a white man with carefully combed and parted wavy hair, wearing a dark jacket over a shirt and tie.	George F. Davis †	Navy	Commander	USS Walke, Lingayen Gulf, Luzon, Philippines	January 6, 1945	
Head and shoulders of a middle-aged white man with a subdued smile wearing a garrison cap with two stars on either side and a military jacket with a large array of ribbon bars covering the entire left breast.	James L. Day	Marine Corps	Corporal	Okinawa, Ryukyu Islands	May 14, 1945 – May 17, 1945	After most of his Marines were wounded or killed, he manned a machine gun and killed more than 100 enemy soldiers despite multiple wounds over a period of several days. He was belatedly awarded the Medal of Honor in 1998.
Head and shoulders of a white man with a thin mustache wearing a white peaked cap, its black visor decorated with oak leaves, and a white military jacket with dark shoulder boards and one medal and two winged pins on the left breast.	Samuel D. Dealey †	Navy	Commander	USS Harder, near Philippines	Jun 6, 1944 – Jun 10, 1944	
Head and shoulders of a young white man with a peaked cap pushed high up on his forehead, wearing a military jacket with two rows of ribbon bars on the left breast and a star-shaped medal hanging from a ribbon around his neck.	Jefferson J. DeBlanc	Marine Corps	Captain	off Kolombangara Island, New Georgia Group, Solomon Islands	January 31, 1943	For downing five Japanese aircraft in a single action
—	Arthur F. DeFranzo †	Army	Staff Sergeant	near Vaubadon, France	June 10, 1944	
Head and shoulders of a young white man with neatly combed hair wearing a military jacket with a round pin on each lapel over a shirt and tie.	Charles N. DeGlopper †	Army	Private First Class	Merderet River at la Fiere, France	June 9, 1944	
—	Emile Deleau Jr. †	Army	Sergeant	Oberhoffen, France	February 1, 1945 – February 2, 1945	
	Ernest H. Dervishian	Army	Technical Sergeant	near Cisterna, Italy	May 23, 1944	
—	James H. Diamond †	Army	Private First Class	Mintal, Mindanao, Philippines	May 8, 1945 – May 14, 1945	
	Robert H. Dietz †	Army	Staff Sergeant	Kirchain, Germany	March 29, 1945	
Head and shoulders of a balding middle-aged white man wearing a light-colored military jacket with three stars on the shoulder and four rows of ribbon bars and a winged pin on the left breast.	Jimmy Doolittle	Air Forces	Lieutenant Colonel	over Japan	April 18, 1942	For leading the Doolittle Raid over the Japanese mainland.
Head and shoulders of a young white man with a thin mustache wearing a garrison cap and a military jacket with two rows of ribbon bars and a round pin on the left breast.	Desmond T. Doss	Army	Private First Class	near Urasoe Mura, Okinawa, Ryukyu Islands	April 29, 1945 – May 21, 1945	The first conscientious objector to receive a Medal of Honor, for saving many lives while acting as a medic. During the Battle of Okinawa, Pfc. Doss single-handedly entered enemy line of fire to retrieve approximately 75 casualties, carrying them one-by-one down a 400-foot escarpment. He later, on separate occasions, rescued a man 200 yards on the same escarpment, treated 4 men within 8 yards of an enemy's cave, treated and administered plasma to an injured artillery officer while continually under fire, and 25 feet from an enemy position, treated and carried another soldier 100 feet to safety. Finally, while he was giving aid to injured soldiers under fire, he was himself injured in the legs by a grenade. He tended his own wounds while he waited for his fellow soldiers to bring a litter. When they arrived, he saw another soldier injured worse and directed the bearers to rescue him first. While waiting for their return, he was shot in the arm. He strapped a gun stock to his arm as splint and crawled the 300 yards of rough terrain to the aid station. He also saved injured Japanese soldiers.
—	Jesse R. Drowley	Army	Staff Sergeant	Bougainville, Solomon Islands	January 30, 1944	
Head of an older white man with gray hair wearing a dark suit coat over a white shirt. A star-shaped medal hangs from a light-blue ribbon around his neck.	Russell E. Dunham	Army	Technical Sergeant	near Kayserberg, France	January 8, 1945	
Head and shoulders of a young white man with neatly combed dark hair wearing a light-colored military jacket with three rows of ribbon bars and a parachute pin on the left breast.	Robert H. Dunlap	Marine Corps	Captain	Iwo Jima, Volcano Islands	February 20, 1945 – February 21, 1945	Risked his life to gather intelligence about and direct fire on enemy gun positions
—	John W. Dutko †	Army	Private First Class	near Ponte Rotto, Italy	May 23, 1944	
Head and shoulders of a white man wearing a garrison cap with an oak leaf on the side and a dark military jacket a row of ribbon bars and two badges on the left breast.	Aquilla J. Dyess †	Marine Corps	Lieutenant Colonel	Namur Island, Kwajalein Atoll, Marshall Islands	February 1, 1944 – February 2, 1944	For leading his battalion in pushing the Japanese out of their positions before he was killed

== E ==
This along with the † indicates that the Medal of Honor was awarded posthumously

Image	Name	Service	Rank	Place of action	Date of action	Notes
	Roddie Edmonds	Army	Master Sergeant	Ziegenhain, Germany	January 27, 1945 – March 30, 1945	Faced death when he refused to identify Jewish-American POWs, saving approximately 200 soldiers. Throughout his time as a POW, he bravely resisted and defied his captors.
	Merritt A. Edson	Marine Corps	Colonel	Guadalcanal, Solomon Islands	September 13, 1942 – September 14, 1942	For successfully leading his battalion in the defense of a vital ridge, inflicting heavy casualties against the enemy in hand-to-hand combat. He was previously awarded two Navy Crosses.
	Walter D. Ehlers	Army	Staff Sergeant	near Goville, France	June 9, 1944 – June 10, 1944	
	Henry T. Elrod †	Marine Corps	Captain	Wake Island	December 8, 1941 – December 23, 1941	For fearlessly engaging an overwhelming enemy force and single-handedly shooting down two planes and sinking a Japanese warship, before he was killed while leading the beach defenses.
—	Gerald L. Endl †	Army	Staff Sergeant	near Anamo, New Guinea	July 11, 1944	For rescuing 6 wounded soldiers single-handedly and was fatally wounded while evacuating the 7th
	Harold G. Epperson †	Marine Corps	Private First Class	Saipan, Mariana Islands	June 25, 1944	For repelling a determined Japanese assault before sacrificing his life by smothering a grenade with his body
	Henry E. Erwin	Air Forces	Staff Sergeant	Koriyama, Japan	April 12, 1945	For locating and ejecting a burning phosphorus smoke grenade from a B-29 cockpit during a raid on Koriyama, Japan. The burns nearly killed him and left him badly disfigured.
	Ray E. Eubanks †	Army	Sergeant	Noemfoor Island, Dutch New Guinea	July 23, 1944	
	Ernest E. Evans †	Navy	Commander	USS Johnston, off Samar	October 25, 1944	For heroic actions as captain of the destroyer U.S.S. Johnston during the Battle Off Samar, 25 October 1944. Upon sighting a massive Japanese force of Battleships and Heavy Cruisers transiting to attack General Douglas MacArthur's 200,000 encamped troops at Red Beach, Leyte, Philippines, Commander Evans broke formation and charged his heavily outmatched destroyer directly toward the enemy force, completing a successful torpedo attack that sank one of the Heavy Cruisers and that threw the force into disarray. His courageous actions inspired similar attacks from other destroyers in the task unit, prompting the task unit commander, Rear Admiral Clifton Sprague, to order all destroyers in the task unit to break formation and attack. When enemy shellfire obliterated the bridge of his ship, Commander Evans shifted his command to the fantail, steering the ship by giving orders through an open hatch to men turning the rudder by hand. Despite suffering the severe mutilation of his left hand early in the attack and being covered in blood from his wounds, he continued to outmaneuver and outgun the opposing force in what amounted to almost three hours of combat. The attacking Japanese force was ultimately driven into retreat, preventing a deadly assault on the Army landing forces at Leyte. His ship eventually sank from the battle damage and the remaining survivors endured over 70 hours in shark-infested waters. Commander Evans was not found among the survivors.
	Forrest E. Everhart	Army	Technical Sergeant	near Kerling, France	November 12, 1944	

== F ==
This along with the † indicates that the Medal of Honor was awarded posthumously

Image	Name	Service	Rank	Place of action	Date of action	Notes
	John P. Fardy †	Marine Corps	Corporal	Okinawa, Ryukyu Islands	May 7, 1945	Sacrificed his life by smothering a grenade with his body
	Robert E. Femoyer †	Air Forces	Second Lieutenant	over Merseburg, Germany	November 2, 1944	
Man in army uniform and lieutenant rank looking at camera.	James H. Fields	Army	First Lieutenant	Rechicourt, France	September 27, 1944	
	John W. Finn	Navy	Chief Aviation ordnanceman	Naval Air Station, Kaneohe Bay, Oahu, Hawaii	December 7, 1941	Stationed at NAS Kaneohe Bay, HI, he demonstrated extraordinary valor during the Japanese air assault on Oahu. Finn manned an exposed 50-caliber machine gun stand and returned significant fire upon Japanese aircraft. Despite numerous painful wounds, he remained at his post and inflicted heavy damage upon the Japanese until ordered to seek medical attention. CPO Finn was the first to receive the Medal of Honor for action in World War II during which the U.S. was neutral.
—	Almond E. Fisher	Army	Second Lieutenant	near Grammont, France	September 12, 1944 – September 13, 1944	
	Francis C. Flaherty †	Navy	Ensign	Pearl Harbor, Hawaii	December 7, 1941	During the evacuation of USS Oklahoma, he remained in a turret, holding a flashlight so the remainder of the turret crew could see to escape, thereby sacrificing his own life.
	Richard E. Fleming †	Marine Corps	Captain	Midway Atoll	June 4, 1942 – June 5, 1942	For taking command after his squadron commander was shot down, leading several attacks on Japanese ships before he himself was shot down.
	Eugene B. Fluckey	Navy	Commander	USS Barb, along east coast of China	December 19, 1944 – February 15, 1945	
	Joseph J. Foss	Marine Corps	Captain	over Guadalcanal, Solomon Islands	October 9, 1942 – November 19, 1942 and January 1943	For shooting down 26 aircraft as leader of the Flying Circus. Later became 20th Governor of South Dakota. First commissioner of the American Football League.
	William A. Foster †	Marine Corps	Private First Class	Okinawa, Ryukyu Islands	May 2, 1945	Sacrificed his life by smothering a grenade with his body
man looking to the side of camera.	William G. Fournier †	Army	Sergeant	Mount Austen, Guadalcanal, Solomon Islands	January 10, 1943	
—	Thomas W. Fowler †	Army	Second Lieutenant	near Carano, Italy	May 23, 1944	
	John R. Fox †	Army	First Lieutenant	near Sommocolonia, Italy	December 26, 1944	One of seven African-American soldiers who received their medals belatedly, after a 1993 study revealed discrimination that caused them to be overlooked at the time. A forward observer with the 366th Infantry Regiment of the segregated 92nd Infantry Division, Fox deliberately ordered his own artillery to fire on top of his position to repel a German advance. When Fox was told that he would not survive the barrage, he replied, "Fire it!" His action permitted U.S. forces - who had been forced to withdraw - to organize a counterattack and regain control of the village.
—	Elmer E. Fryar †	Army	Private	Leyte, Philippines	December 8, 1944	
	Leonard A. Funk Jr.	Army	First Sergeant	Holzheim, Belgium	January 29, 1945	
	Samuel G. Fuqua	Navy	Lieutenant Commander	Pearl Harbor, Hawaii	December 7, 1941	Incapacitated in the initial bombing of USS Arizona, he recovered to direct the fighting of the fires and the rescue of wounded and injured personnel. He stayed on deck through the continuous bombing and strafing, leading in a calm and cool manner that resulted in the saving of many lives.

== G ==
This along with the † indicates that the Medal of Honor was awarded posthumously

Image	Name	Service	Rank	Place of action	Date of action	Notes
	Robert E. Galer	Marine Corps	Major	Solomon Islands area	Aug 1942 – Sep 1942	For service in the Solomon Islands as the leader of a Marine fighter squadron.
	William W. Galt †	Army	Captain	Villa Crocetta, Italy	May 29, 1944	For his leadership and courage in directing an assault against an entrenched force that had repulsed two previous attacks.
	Archer T. Gammon †	Army	Staff Sergeant	near Bastogne, Belgium	January 11, 1945	While under fire from a German machine gun and tank, counterattacked the German force and forced them to retreat with grenade and small arms fire.
	Joe Gandara †	Army	Private	Amfreville, France	June 9, 1944	Advanced voluntarily and alone toward an enemy position and destroyed three hostile machine guns before being fatally wounded.
	Marcario Garcia	Army	Private	near Grosshau, Germany	November 27, 1944	After realizing that his company could not advance because it was pinned down by enemy machine gun fire, on his own initiative, went alone and destroyed 2 enemy emplacements and captured 4 prisoners. Despite being wounded himself, he continued to fight on with his unit until the objective was taken.
	Harold A. Garman	Army	Private	near Montereau, France	August 25, 1944	When a boat loaded with wounded came under fire from a German machine gun on the opposite river bank, he dove into the river braving enemy machine gun fire to tow the boat to safety.
	Donald A. Gary	Navy	Lieutenant, Junior Grade	Japanese home islands near Kobe, Japan	March 19, 1945	For braving hazardous conditions on the USS Franklin when it was hit by enemy fire to save sailors trapped inside the vessel's hull.
—	Robert E. Gerstung	Army	Technical Sergeant	Siegfried Line near Berg, Germany	December 19, 1944	
—	Eric G. Gibson †	Army	Technician 5th Grade	near Isola Bella, Italy	January 28, 1944	
	Howard W. Gilmore †	Navy	Commander	USS Growler, southwest Pacific	January 10, 1943 – February 7, 1943	While wounded on the bridge and unable to get below in time, gave the order for the submarine to crash dive to avoid an imminent attack, sacrificing himself to save the ship and the crew.
	Harold Gonsalves †	Marine Corps	Private First Class	Okinawa, Ryukyu Islands	April 15, 1945	While laying telephone lines for communication with the artillery battalion in Okinawa, he saved two other Marines after flinging himself atop of a Japanese grenade and taking the full brunt of the resulting explosion allowing the other two men to complete the mission.
	David M. Gonzales †	Army	Private First Class	Villa Verde Trail, Luzon, Philippines	April 25, 1945	During intense combat, his company was pinned down by enemy machine gun fire. Despite the grave danger, he went to the aid of his fellow soldiers who had been buried in a bomb explosion. Digging them out with his bare hands and a shovel, under continuous enemy fire, he managed to rescue three of the men before being mortally wounded. His selfless actions and sacrifice allowed his unit to continue their advance and contributed significantly to their mission's success.
	Nathan G. Gordon	Navy	Lieutenant, Junior Grade	Bismarck Sea	February 15, 1944	Later Lieutenant Governor of Arkansas
	Donald J. Gott †	Air Forces	First Lieutenant	Saarbrücken, Germany	November 9, 1944	Piloted a B-17 aircraft on a bombing run on Saarbrücken. Even though his plane was severely damaged and set ablaze by anti-aircraft fire which wounded the engineer and the radio operator, Gott and co-pilot William E. Metzger Jr. successfully dropped their bombs on the target and flew the plane to friendly territory. After having their crew bail out except for the unconscious radio operator, Gott and Metzger attempted to crashland the plane to save their helpless comrade. The plane exploded, killing the three remaining crewmembers on board.
—	William J. Grabiarz †	Army	Private First Class	Manila, Luzon, Philippines	February 23, 1945	For using his body to shield a wounded officer from hostile fire.
	Ross F. Gray †	Marine Corps	Sergeant	Iwo Jima, Volcano Islands	February 21, 1945	Single-handedly overcame a strong enemy garrison and completely disarmed a large mine field before finally rejoining his unit.
—	Stephen R. Gregg	Army	Technical Sergeant	near Montelimar, France	August 27, 1944	
—	Kenneth E. Gruennert †	Army	Sergeant	near Buna, New Guinea	December 24, 1942	
	Henry Gurke †	Marine Corps	Private First Class	Bougainville, Solomon Islands	November 9, 1943	Fell on a grenade that landed in his foxhole, saving the man with him

== H ==
This along with the † indicates that the Medal of Honor was awarded posthumously

Image	Name	Service	Rank	Place of action	Date of action	Notes
	Barney F. Hajiro	Army	Private	near Bruyeres and Biffontaine, eastern France	October 19, 1944, October 22, 1944, and October 29, 1944	One of 22 Asian-American soldiers who received their medals in 2000, after a study revealed discrimination that caused them to be overlooked at the time.
—	George J. Hall	Army	Staff Sergeant	near Anzio, Italy	May 23, 1944	Single-handedly captured two German machine gun positions and was severely wounded while attempting to take a third, resulting in him having to self-amputate his right leg.
—	Lewis Hall †	Army	Technician 5th Grade	Mount Austen, Guadalcanal, Solomon Islands	January 10, 1943	During a Japanese attack he refused an order to withdraw after many men in his unit had been killed or wounded and, with a fellow soldier, stayed behind to man a machine gun.
	William E. Hall	Navy	Lieutenant, Junior Grade	Coral Sea	May 7, 1942 – May 8, 1942	Dive bombed a Japanese aircraft carrier, contributing greatly to its destruction. The next day, he attacked a superior number of Japanese planes and shot down three. Although his craft was damaged and he was seriously wounded in this attack, he managed to land safely.
Man with army uniform on looking at camera.	Sherwood H. Hallman †	Army	Staff Sergeant	Brest, Brittany, France	September 13, 1944	
	William D. Halyburton Jr. †	Navy	Pharmacist's Mate Second class	Okinawa, Ryukyu Islands	May 10, 1945	Killed shielding a wounded Marine with his body while administering aid.
	Pierpont M. Hamilton	Air Forces	Major	near Port Lyautey, French Morocco	November 8, 1942	
	Owen F. P. Hammerberg †	Navy	Boatswain's mate Second class	West Loch, Pearl Harbor	February 17, 1945	Rescued two other divers trapped beneath a sunken LST before he himself became trapped and perished.
	Dale M. Hansen †	Marine Corps	Private	Okinawa, Ryukyu Islands	May 7, 1945	For destroying two hostile positions with a rocket launcher and hand grenades, killing 12 Japanese
	Robert M. Hanson †	Marine Corps	First Lieutenant	Bougainville Island and New Britain Island	November 1, 1943 and January 24, 1944	One of the top Marine aces, he shot down a total of 25 enemy aircraft before he himself was shot down and killed. He was also awarded the Navy Cross.
—	Roy W. Harmon †	Army	Sergeant	near Casaglia, Italy	July 12, 1944	
	Harry R. Harr †	Army	Corporal	near Maglamin, Mindanao, Philippines	June 5, 1945	
	William G. Harrell	Marine Corps	Sergeant	Iwo Jima, Volcano Islands	March 3, 1945	Risked his life to defend his position against a larger enemy force
—	James L. Harris †	Army	Second Lieutenant	Vagney, France	October 7, 1944	
	Mikio Hasemoto †	Army	Private	near Cerasuolo, Italy	November 29, 1943	One of 22 Asian-American soldiers who received their medals in 2000, after a study revealed discrimination that caused them to be overlooked at the time.
Man in uniform looking to the camera from the side.	Joe R. Hastings †	Army	Private First Class	Drabenderhohe, Germany	April 12, 1945	
	Louis J. Hauge Jr. †	Marine Corps	Corporal	Okinawa, Ryukyu Islands	May 14, 1945	For single-handedly charging and knocking out two enemy machine gun positions before he was killed.
—	John D. Hawk	Army	Sergeant	near Chambois, France	August 20, 1944	
	William D. Hawkins †	Marine Corps	First Lieutenant	Betio Island, Tarawa Atoll, Gilbert Islands	November 20, 1943 – November 21, 1943	For leading attacks on multiple enemy positions, knocking five out before he was badly wounded, but persisting in knocking out another three before he was killed.
	Lloyd C. Hawks	Army	Private First Class	near Carano, Italy	January 30, 1944	
	Joe Hayashi †	Army	Private	near Tendola, Italy	April 20, 1945 and April 22, 1945	One of 22 Asian-American soldiers who received their medals in 2000, after a study revealed discrimination that caused them to be overlooked at the time.
	Shizuya Hayashi	Army	Private	near Cerasuolo, Italy	November 29, 1943	One of 22 Asian-American soldiers who received their medals in 2000, after a study revealed discrimination that caused them to be overlooked at the time.
—	Clinton M. Hedrick †	Army	Technical Sergeant	near Lembeck, Germany	March 27, 1945 – March 28, 1945	
	James R. Hendrix	Army	Private	near Assenois, Belgium	December 26, 1944	
man looking at camera in uniform.	Robert T. Henry †	Army	Private	Luchem, Germany	December 3, 1944	
	Silvestre S. Herrera	Army	Private First Class	near Mertzwiller, France	March 15, 1945	
	Rufus G. Herring	Navy	Lieutenant, Junior Grade	as commanding officer aboard a landing craft, USS LCI (G) 449, Iwo Jima, Volcano Islands	February 17, 1945	Maintained position in the firing line with his 20-mm guns in action in the face of sustained enemy fire and conned his crippled ship to safety
	Edwin J. Hill †	Navy	Chief Boatswain	Pearl Harbor, Hawaii	December 7, 1941	During the height of the strafing and bombing of USS Nevada, led his men of the linehandling details to the quays, cast off the lines and swam back to his ship. Back on board, while attempting to let go the anchors, was blown overboard and killed by the explosion of several bombs.
—	Freeman V. Horner	Army	Staff Sergeant	Wurselen, Germany	November 16, 1944	On October 30, 1945, United States Army Officer Freeman V. Horner was awarded the Medal of Honor for his heroic actions during World War II. During the second World War, Sergeant Freeman Horner and his company were stationed in Nazi Germany. On November 16, 1944, Sergeant Horner and his company were attacking Wurselen, Germany, and were experiencing heavy resistance. He ran into enemy lines thinking he was safe, and immediately had enemy firing at him. He was able to make it all the way over there and was able to destroy over 9 machine guns. He went on to live his life in Columbus, Georgia, with his wife, who cared for him until his death of a brain aneurysm.
	James H. Howard	Air Forces	Major	over Oschersleben, Germany	January 11, 1944	Only fighter pilot in the European Theater of Operations in World War II to be awarded the Medal of Honor
	Paul B. Huff	Army	Corporal	near Carano, Italy	February 8, 1944	February 8, 1944, near Carano, Italy, Huff led a reconnaissance patrol while under heavy fire from German forces. For his actions during the patrol, Huff received the Medal of Honor three months later, on May 26.He led a 6-man patrol into German grounds, and was found in an open fire with the enemy. Knowing the danger, he left his patrol and continued on by himself. He crawled over 75 yards to get to them. He was able to kill them while kneeling with his submachine gun. Before leaving the army, Huff reached the highest enlisted rank, command sergeant major, a position which carried the responsibilities of being the senior enlisted advisor to the commanding officer and a monitor for, and advocate of, the enlisted men in the command. He was survived by his wife, Betty Cunnyngham Huff. Paul Huff Parkway, a major thoroughfare in Cleveland, Tennessee, is named in his honor, as is the Paul B. Huff Army Reserve Center, located in Nashville.
	Lloyd Herbert Hughes †	Air Forces	Second Lieutenant	Ploiești Raid, Romania	August 1, 1943	
—	Johnnie D. Hutchins †	Navy	Seaman First class	aboard a landing ship, USS LST 473, off Lae, New Guinea	September 4, 1943	

== I ==
Image	Name	Service	Rank	Place of action	Date of action	Notes
Head and shoulders portrait of an older Asian man wearing a business suit and tie.	Daniel K. Inouye	Army	Second Lieutenant	near San Terenzo, Italy	April 21, 1945	Later became a U.S. Senator representing Hawaii. Served as President pro tempore of the United States Senate and was third in line to the Presidency of the United States; prior to Kamala Harris becoming Vice President, was the highest ranking Asian-American politician in U.S. history. One of 22 Asian-American soldiers who received their medals in 2000, after a study revealed discrimination that caused them to be overlooked at the time. Inouye was attacked by three machine gun nests while advancing up a hill near San Terenzo, Italy. One attacked him wounding his abdomen. He then proceeded, while under fire, to attack two of the nests with grenades and then his Thompson sub-machine gun. While drawing a grenade to attack the third nest, he was hit by some German shrapnel that nearly tore off his right arm. Somehow, he was able to throw the grenade that he picked back up with his left arm into the nest and then continued to use his machine gun to continue to attack the German gunners.

== J ==
This along with the † indicates that the Medal of Honor was awarded posthumously

Image	Name	Service	Rank	Place of action	Date of action	Notes
man leaning to the side with airborne cap on.	Isadore S. Jachman †	Army	Staff Sergeant	Flamierge, Belgium	January 4, 1945	
	Arthur J. Jackson	Marine Corps	Private First Class	Peleliu Island, Palau Group	September 18, 1944	For single-handedly destroying 12 enemy pillboxes and killing 50 enemy soldiers.
	Douglas T. Jacobson	Marine Corps	Private First Class	Iwo Jima, Volcano Islands	February 26, 1945	Risked his life by destroying a total of sixteen enemy positions and approximately 75 Japanese
—	Willy F. James Jr. †	Army	Private First Class	near Lippoldsberg, Germany	April 7, 1945	One of seven African-American soldiers who received their medals belatedly, after a 1993 study revealed discrimination that caused them to be overlooked at the time.
	John L. Jerstad †	Air Forces	Major	Ploiești Raid, Romania	August 1, 1943	
Man looking at the camera smiling.	Elden H. Johnson †	Army	Private	near Valmontone, Italy	June 3, 1944	
	Leon W. Johnson	Air Forces	Colonel	Ploiești Raid, Romania	August 1, 1943	A United States Air Force general who was awarded the Medal of Honor for leading the attack on the Ploesti oil fields during World War II. Following the raid on Ploesti, one of the war's costliest aerial encounters for all concerned, Johnson was awarded the Medal of Honor.
—	Leroy Johnson †	Army	Sergeant	near Limon, Leyte, Philippines	December 15, 1944	
Man with army uniform on looking at camera wearing medal of honor.	Oscar G. Johnson	Army	Private First Class	near Scarperia, Italy	September 16, 1944 – September 18, 1944	
—	William J. Johnston	Army	Private First Class	Anzio, Italy	February 17, 1944 – February 19, 1944	Johnston was a machine gunner attached to the Third Platoon of his company and that platoon was the furthest advanced element in the company's defenses. About eighty Germans advanced under the cover of an artillery barrage in the darkness and were within about 200 yards of the platoon's positions when they were discovered by Johnston who was at his gun. He manned his machine gun and the attack was halted. All during the day, without relief, he remained with his weapon and fired at every target that presented itself. One German worked up the draw so close to the position that the machine gun could not be brought to bear upon him. Johnston drew his pistol and killed him. As the day wore on, it became evident that if the company was to escape it would have to begin its movement. Not everyone could get out. Johnson volunteered to stay. Afterwards an artillery shell made what almost amounted to a direct hit on Johnston's position and shell fragments penetrated into the left portion of his chest. An examination indicated that he was dying. The rapid advance of large numbers of the Germans prevented any evacuation. A few minutes later one of the last men to withdraw saw Johnston trying to crawl up to his machine gun. At Johnston's request he was helped to his gun and left believing that he was dying. A few minutes later the Company heard the machine gun in action. It continued to fire for about 10 minutes. Afterwards the gun went silent. The Germans passed him as he lay in his position, and, believing him to be dead, stole his shoes. The next day, he painfully worked his way through the German lines to the 180th Regiment, after having been reported by the company as killed in action. Despite his weakened condition, he gave accurate and vital information about the German positions on the base of which effective firing that was compiled.
	Herbert C. Jones †	Navy	Ensign	Pearl Harbor, Hawaii	December 7, 1941	Organized and led a party to supply ammunition to the antiaircraft battery of USS California after the mechanical hoists were put out of action when he was fatally wounded by a bomb explosion. When 2 men attempted to take him from the area, he ordered "Leave me alone! I am done for. Get out of here before the magazines go off."
	Joseph R. Julian †	Marine Corps	Platoon Sergeant	Iwo Jima, Volcano Islands	March 9, 1945	Sacrificed his life to eliminate an enemy threat

== K ==
This along with the † indicates that the Medal of Honor was awarded posthumously

Image	Name	Service	Rank	Place of action	Date of action	Notes
—	Victor L. Kandle †	Army	First Lieutenant	near La Forge, France	October 9, 1944	
Man in uniform looking to the camera with hair slicked back.	John R. Kane	Air Forces	Colonel	Ploiești Raid, Romania	August 1, 1943	
	Neel E. Kearby	Air Forces	Colonel	near Wewak, New Guinea	October 11, 1943	For facing 12 to 1 odds at low fuel against Lieutenant Colonel Teranishi's force
	George D. Keathley †	Army	Staff Sergeant	Mt. Altuzzo, Italy	September 14, 1944	After suffering a mortal wound in his left side from a hand grenade, he refused to take cover. He continued to battle the enemy and shout orders to his soldiers. After the platoons of Company B repulsed numerous counterattacks, the enemy withdrew. Staff Sergeant Keathley died shortly after victory was achieved.
—	Gus Kefurt †	Army	Staff Sergeant	near Bennwihr, France	December 23, 1944 – December 24, 1944	
	Jonah E. Kelley †	Army	Staff Sergeant	Kesternich, Germany	January 30, 1945 – January 31, 1945	
—	Ova A. Kelley †	Army	Private	Leyte, Philippines	December 8, 1944	
—	Charles E. Kelly	Army	Corporal	near Altavilla, Italy	September 13, 1943	
—	John D. Kelly †	Army	Corporal	Fort du Roule, Cherbourg, France	June 25, 1944	
	Thomas J. Kelly	Army	Corporal	Alemert, Germany	April 5, 1945	
	Reinhardt J. Keppler †	Navy	Boatswain's Mate First class	USS San Francisco, Solomon Islands	November 12, 1942 – November 13, 1942	
—	Dexter J. Kerstetter	Army	Private First Class	near Galiano, Luzon, Philippines	April 13, 1945	
—	Patrick L. Kessler †	Army	Private First Class	near Ponte Rotto, Italy	May 23, 1944	
	Isaac C. Kidd †	Navy	Rear Admiral	Pearl Harbor, Hawaii	December 7, 1941	Remained on the bridge of USS Arizona, discharging his duties as Commander of Battleship Division One and Senior Officer Present Afloat even as the ship blew up from magazine explosions, until a direct bomb hit on the bridge resulted in the loss of his life.
—	Truman Kimbro †	Army	Technician 4th Grade	near Rocherath, Belgium	December 19, 1944	After repeated attempts to take his squad across a road to lay mines were repulsed by withering fire, Kimbro ordered his squad to stay behind while he crawled across the road alone. Seriously wounded in his advance, Kimbro was able to successfully lay mines on the other side of the road, which helped delay the advance of enemy armor. While trying to return to his squad, Kimbro was killed by intense enemy machine gun and rifle fire.
—	Harold G. Kiner †	Army	Private	near Palenberg, Germany	October 2, 1944	
	David R. Kingsley †	Air Forces	Second Lieutenant	Ploiești Raid, Romania	June 23, 1944	Sacrificed himself by giving away his parachute to the injured tailgunner of his crew whose parachute was lost. He then died when his B-17 crashed
	Elbert L. Kinser †	Marine Corps	Sergeant	Okinawa, Ryukyu Islands	May 4, 1945	Sacrificed his life by smothering a grenade with his body
Man with uniform looking at the camera with medals on his chest.	Gerry H. Kisters	Army	Sergeant	near Gagliano, Sicily	July 31, 1943	
—	Alton W. Knappenberger	Army	Private First Class	near Cisterna di Littoria, Italy	February 1, 1944	
—	Jack L. Knight †	Army	First Lieutenant	near LoiKang, Burma	February 2, 1945	
Man with air force uniform looking to the side.	Raymond L. Knight †	Air Forces	First Lieutenant	northern Po Valley, Italy	April 24, 1945 – April 25, 1945	
	Yeiki Kobashigawa	Army	Technical Sergeant	near Lanuvio, Italy	June 2, 1944	Destroyed multiple enemy machine gun nests in the vicinity of Lanuvio, Italy. One of 22 Asian-American soldiers who received their medals in 2000, after a study revealed discrimination that caused them to be overlooked at the time.
	Richard E. Kraus †	Marine Corps	Private First Class	Peleliu Island, Palau Group	October 3, 1944	Sacrificed his life by smothering a grenade with his body
—	Anthony L. Krotiak †	Army	Private First Class	Balete Pass, Luzon, Philippines	May 8, 1945	
	Robert T. Kuroda †	Army	Staff Sergeant	near Bruyeres, France	October 20, 1944	One of 22 Asian-American soldiers who received their medals in 2000, after a study revealed discrimination that caused them to be overlooked at the time.

== L ==
This along with the † indicates that the Medal of Honor was awarded posthumously

Image	Name	Service	Rank	Place of action	Date of action	Notes
	James D. La Belle †	Marine Corps	Private First Class	Iwo Jima, Volcano Islands	March 8, 1945	Sacrificed his life by smothering a grenade with his body
	Salvador J. Lara	Army	Staff Sergeant	Aprilia, Italy	May 27, 1944 – May 28, 1944	Aggressively led his rifle squad in neutralizing multiple enemy strongpoints and inflicting large numbers of casualties, and resumed the attack the next day despite receiving a severe leg wound.
Elderly white man wearing a suit, tie, and glasses, with a medal hanging from a ribbon around his neck.	William R. Lawley Jr.	Air Forces	First Lieutenant	over Europe	February 20, 1944	
	Robert E. Laws	Army	Staff Sergeant	Pangasinan Province, Luzon, Philippines	January 12, 1945	
—	Daniel W. Lee	Army	Second Lieutenant	Montreval, France	September 2, 1944	
	John H. Leims	Marine Corps	Second Lieutenant	Iwo Jima, Volcano Islands	March 7, 1945	Risked his life to rescue several wounded Marines
	Turney W. Leonard †	Army	First Lieutenant	Kommerscheidt, Germany	November 4, 1944 – November 6, 1944	
WilliamFLeonard243	William F. Leonard	Army	Staff Sergeant	Near St. Die, France	November 7, 1944	Led an assault continuously swept by enemy automatic fire, killing two snipers, and, despite bullets wounds to his back, destroyed two machine guns and captured a roadblock objective.
—	Fred F. Lester †	Navy	Hospital Apprentice First class	Okinawa, Ryukyu Islands	June 8, 1945	
Man with army uniform looking at the camera smiling.	Darrell R. Lindsey †	Air Forces	Captain	L'Isle Adam railroad bridge over the Seine, France	August 9, 1944	
Man with army paratrooper uniform looking to the side.	Jake W. Lindsey	Army	Technical Sergeant	near Hamich, Germany	November 16, 1944	
man looking to the left holding a pistol.	Floyd K. Lindstrom †	Army	Private First Class	near Mignano, Italy	November 11, 1943	
—	Edgar H. Lloyd †	Army	First Lieutenant	near Pompey, France	September 14, 1944	
	Donald R. Lobaugh †	Army	Private	near Afua, New Guinea	July 22, 1944	
—	James M. Logan	Army	Sergeant	near Salerno, Italy	September 9, 1943	
	Jose M. Lopez	Army	Sergeant	near Krinkelt, Belgium	December 17, 1944	
	Jacklyn H. Lucas	Marine Corps	Private First Class	Iwo Jima, Volcano Islands	February 20, 1945	Youngest recipient since the Civil War (turned 17 just 5 days before Iwo Jima D-Day)
	Jack Lummus †	Marine Corps	First Lieutenant	Iwo Jima, Volcano Islands	March 8, 1945	Had earlier played football for the New York Giants

== M ==
This along with the † indicates that the Medal of Honor was awarded posthumously

Image	Name	Service	Rank	Place of action	Date of action	Notes
	George L. Mabry Jr.	Army	Lieutenant Colonel	Hurtgen Forest near Schevenhütte, Germany	November 20, 1944	
	Douglas MacArthur	Army	General	Bataan Peninsula, Philippines	April 1, 1942	With his father, Arthur MacArthur Jr., became first father and son pair to both receive the Medal of Honor.
	Charles A. MacGillivary	Army	Sergeant	near Woelfling, France	January 1, 1945	Immigrant from Canada.
	John D. Magrath †	Army	Private First Class	near Castel d'Aiano, Italy	April 14, 1945	
—	Joe E. Mann †	Army	Private First Class	Best, Holland	September 18, 1944	
	Harry L. Martin †	Marine Corps	First Lieutenant	Iwo Jima, Volcano Islands	March 26, 1945	Sacrificed his life to help rescue some of his men who had been overrun by the enemy.
	Joe P. Martinez †	Army	Private	Attu, Aleutians	May 26, 1943	First private to earn the medal in World War II and the first and only soldier to earn such medal in a battle that occurred on American soil
	Leonard F. Mason †	Marine Corps	Private First Class	Asan-Adelup Beachhead, Guam, Mariana Islands	July 22, 1944	For single-handedly knocking out two enemy machine guns despite being mortally wounded
Man with army uniform looking to the side.	Archibald Mathies †	Air Forces	Sergeant	over Germany	February 20, 1944	
Man with army uniform looking at camera with hat.	Jack W. Mathis †	Air Forces	First Lieutenant	over Vegesack, Germany	March 18, 1943	
	Robert D. Maxwell	Army	Technician 5th Grade	near Besançon, France	September 7, 1944	
—	Martin O. May †	Army	Private First Class	legusuku-Yama, Ie Shima, Ryukyu Islands	April 19, 1945 – April 21, 1945	Defended his machine gun position for 3 days against Japanese attacks, even when wounded, thus maintaining the American lines. Refusing to withdraw when his machine gun was disabled, he used hand grenades to fight to his death.
—	Melvin Mayfield	Army	Corporal	Cordillera Mountains, Luzon, Philippines	July 29, 1945	Mayfield's actions, on July 29, 1945, were the last to earn a Medal of Honor prior to the August 15, 1945, end of hostilities in World War II – though some honorees may have been cited for their Medal after Mayfield's recognition on May 31, 1946.
—	Thomas E. McCall	Army	Staff Sergeant	near San Angelo, Italy	January 22, 1944	
	David McCampbell	Navy	Commander	First and second battles of the Philippine Sea	June 19, 1944	Top Navy flying ace with 34 kills, was also awarded the Navy Cross
	Bruce McCandless	Navy	Commander	Battle off Savo Island	November 12, 1942 – November 13, 1942	
	Robert H. McCard †	Marine Corps	Gunnery Sergeant	Saipan, Mariana Islands	June 16, 1944	For saving the lives of his tank crewmen.
	Lloyd G. McCarter	Army	Private	Corregidor, Philippines	February 16, 1945 – February 19, 1945	
	Joseph J. McCarthy	Marine Corps	Captain	Iwo Jima, Volcano Islands	February 21, 1945	Risked his life to eliminate several enemy troops so his men could move forward
—	Richard M. McCool	Navy	Lieutenant	off Okinawa, Ryukyu Islands	June 10, 1945 – June 11, 1945	Off the coast of Okinawa Island, McCool helped rescue the survivors of sinking destroyer USS William D. Porter. The next day, his own ship was hit by a Japanese kamikaze. Although he suffered severe burns and shrapnel wounds in the initial explosion, McCool continued to lead his crew in the firefighting and rescue efforts until relief arrived.
—	Charles L. McGaha	Army	Master Sergeant	near Lupao, Luzon, Philippines	February 7, 1945	
—	Vernon McGarity	Army	Technical Sergeant	near Krinkelt, Belgium	December 16, 1944	
	William D. McGee †	Army	Private	near Mulheim, Germany	March 18, 1945	
—	Troy A. McGill †	Army	Sergeant	Los Negros Islands, Admiralty Group	March 4, 1944	
—	Francis X. McGraw †	Army	Private First Class	near Schevenhütte, Germany	November 19, 1944	
	Thomas B. McGuire Jr. †	Air Forces	Major	over Luzon, Philippines	December 25, 1944 – December 26, 1944	The second leading air ace in World War II before being killed in action in January 1945. McGuire Air Force Base is named for him.
—	John R. McKinney	Army	Private	Tayabas Province, Luzon, Philippines	May 11, 1945	
	Robert M. McTureous Jr. †	Marine Corps	Private	Okinawa, Ryukyu Islands	June 7, 1945	For attacking multiple enemy positions with hand grenades, diverting fire away from stretcher-bearers before he was fatally wounded
	John J. McVeigh †	Army	Sergeant	near Brest, France	August 29, 1944	
—	William A. McWhorter †	Army	Private First Class	Leyte, Philippines	December 5, 1944	
—	John W. Meagher	Army	Technical Sergeant	near Ozato, Okinawa, Ryukyu Islands	June 19, 1945	
	Manuel V. Mendoza	Army	Master Sergeant	Mt. Battaglia, Italy	October 4, 1944	Single-handedly broke up a German counterattack.
	Gino J. Merli	Army	Private First Class	near Sars la Bruyere, Belgium	September 4, 1944 – September 5, 1944	Held off German troops overnight, even when his machine gun nest was captured.
—	Joseph F. Merrell †	Army	Private	near Lohe, Germany	April 18, 1945	Single-handedly attacked German positions which were firing on his unit. He disabled two enemy machine gun emplacements and killed nearly two dozen German soldiers before he was himself killed, at the age of 18.
—	Harold O. Messerschmidt †	Army	Sergeant	near Radden, France	September 17, 1944	
Man with army air force uniform looking to the side of the camera.	William E. Metzger Jr. †	Air Forces	Second Lieutenant	Saarbrücken, Germany	November 9, 1944	Co-piloted a B-17 aircraft on a bombing run on Saarbrücken. Even though his plane was severely damaged and set ablaze by anti-aircraft fire which wounded the engineer and the radio operator, Metzger and pilot Donald J. Gott successfully dropped their bombs on the target and flew the plane to friendly territory. After having their crew bail out except for the unconscious radio operator, Metzger and Gott attempted to crashland the plane to save their helpless comrade. The plane exploded, killing the three remaining crewmembers on board.
Portrait of a gray-haired white man wearing a dark blue suit and tie	Edward S. Michael	Air Forces	First Lieutenant	over Germany	April 11, 1944	
—	Harry J. Michael †	Army	Second Lieutenant	near Neiderzerf, Germany	March 14, 1945	
—	Andrew Miller †	Army	Staff Sergeant	from Woippy, France to Kerprich Hemmersdorf, Germany	November 16, 1944 – November 29, 1944	
	James H. Mills	Army	Private	near Cisterna di Littoria, Italy	May 24, 1944	
—	John W. Minick †	Army	Staff Sergeant	near Hurtgen, Germany	November 21, 1944	
—	Nicholas Minue †	Army	Private	near MedjezelBab, Tunisia	April 28, 1943	
	Jimmie W. Monteith Jr. †	Army	First Lieutenant	near Colleville-sur-Mer, Normandy, France	June 6, 1944	
	Jack C. Montgomery	Army	First Lieutenant	near, Padiglione, Italy	February 22, 1944	
—	Harold H. Moon Jr. †	Army	Private	Pawig, Leyte, Philippines	October 21, 1944	
	John C. Morgan	Air Forces	Second Lieutenant	over Germany	July 28, 1943	
—	Edward J. Moskala †	Army	Private First Class	Kakazu Ridge, Okinawa, Ryukyu Islands	April 9, 1945	
	Kaoru Moto	Army	Private First Class	near Castellina, Italy	July 7, 1944	One of 22 Asian-American soldiers who received their medals in 2000, after a study revealed discrimination that caused them to be overlooked at the time. On his own initiative he defeated a machine gun nest killing one soldier and taking a second one prisoner and forced an additional machine gun team to retreat. Even though wounded by sniper fire and relieved of his position, he defeated another machine gun nest on his way back to the rear, taking three more prisoners.
—	Charles E. Mower †	Army	Sergeant	near Capoocan, Leyte, Philippines	November 3, 1944	
—	Joseph E. Muller †	Army	Sergeant	near Ishimmi, Okinawa, Ryukyu Islands	May 15, 1945 – May 16, 1945	
	Sadao S. Munemori †	Army	Private First Class	near Seravezza, Italy	April 5, 1945	For taking out two machine-gun emplacements and jumping onto a grenade to save 2 soldiers.
	Douglas A. Munro †	Coast Guard	Signalman First class	off Point Cruz, Guadalcanal, Solomon Islands	September 27, 1942	Only member of the Coast Guard to receive the Medal of Honor.
	Kiyoshi K. Muranaga †	Army	Private First Class	near Suvereto, Italy	June 26, 1944	One of 22 Asian-American soldiers who received their medals in 2000, after a study revealed discrimination that caused them to be overlooked at the time.
	Audie L. Murphy	Army	Second Lieutenant	near Holtzwihr, France	January 26, 1945	One of the most decorated American combat soldiers of World War II, receiving every military combat award for valor available from the U.S. Army, as well as French and Belgian awards for heroism.
	Frederick C. Murphy †	Army	Private First Class	Siegfried Line at Saarlautern, Germany	March 18, 1945	
Head and shoulders of an elderly white man with a round face, wearing a tuxedo with military medals pinned to the chest and one medal hanging from a light blue ribbon around his neck.	Charles P. Murray Jr.	Army	First Lieutenant	near Kaysersberg, France	December 16, 1944	

== N ==
This along with the † indicates that the Medal of Honor was awarded posthumously

Image	Name	Service	Rank	Place of action	Date of action	Notes
	Masato Nakae †	Army	Private	near Pisa, Italy	August 19, 1944	One of 22 Asian-American soldiers who received their medals in 2000, after a study revealed discrimination that caused them to be overlooked at the time.
	Shinyei Nakamine †	Army	Private	near La Torreto, Italy	June 2, 1944	One of 22 Asian-American soldiers who received their medals in 2000, after a study revealed discrimination that caused them to be overlooked at the time.
Head of a smiling young man wearing a peaked cap with a round medallion on the front and a military jacket over a shirt and tie.	William K. Nakamura †	Army	Private First Class	near Castellina, Italy	July 4, 1944	One of 22 Asian-American soldiers who received their medals in 2000, after a study revealed discrimination that caused them to be overlooked at the time.
—	William L. Nelson †	Army	Sergeant	Djebel Dardys, Northwest of Sedjenane, Tunisia	April 24, 1943	
—	Ralph G. Neppel	Army	Sergeant	Birgel, Germany	December 14, 1944	Upon returning to America after World War II, Ralph George Neppel received the Medal of Honor for continuing to man his machine gun during the Battle of the Bulge after German fire severed his leg. By staying at his post during the battle he helped destroy German reserves who were thrown at American forces. After he was discharged from the military he returned to Iowa. Neppel died at the age of 63 in 1987.
	Robert B. Nett	Army	First Lieutenant	near Cognon, Leyte, Philippines	December 14, 1944	
	John D. New †	Marine Corps	Private First Class	Peleliu Island, Palau Group	September 25, 1944	Sacrificed his life by smothering a grenade with his body
—	Beryl R. Newman	Army	First Lieutenant	near Cisterna, Italy	May 26, 1944	For single-handedly destroying three machine gun emplacements.
—	Alfred B. Nietzel †	Army	Sergeant	Heistern, Germany	November 18, 1944	When an enemy assault threatened to overrun his unit's position, Nietzel covered for the retreating members of his squad, expending all his ammunition and holding his post until being killed. One of 24 soldiers who received their medals in 2014, after a study revealed discrimination that caused them to be overlooked.
	Alexander R. Nininger †	Army	Second Lieutenant	near Abucay, Bataan, Philippines	January 12, 1942	
Head and shoulders of a smiling young man with dimples and round wire-framed glasses wearing a garrison cap and a military jacket over a shirt and tie.	Joe M. Nishimoto †	Army	Private First Class	near La Houssiere, France	November 7, 1944	One of 22 Asian-American soldiers who received their medals in 2000, after a study revealed discrimination that caused them to be overlooked at the time.

== O ==
This along with the † indicates that the Medal of Honor was awarded posthumously

Image	Name	Service	Rank	Place of action	Date of action	Notes
Man with army uniform and service cap looking to the side.	William J. O'Brien †	Army	Lieutenant Colonel	Saipan, Mariana Islands	June 20, 1944 – July 7, 1944	
	Joseph T. O'Callahan	Navy	Lieutenant Commander	near Kobe, Japan	March 19, 1945	Chaplain aboard aircraft carrier USS Franklin.
—	Carlos C. Ogden	Army	First Lieutenant	near Fort du Roule, France	June 25, 1944	
	Edward H. O'Hare	Navy	Lieutenant	off Papua New Guinea	February 20, 1942	O'Hare International Airport in Chicago was named in his memory.
—	Allan M. Ohata †	Army	Sergeant	near Cerasuolo, Italy	November 29, 1943 – November 30, 1943	One of 22 Asian-American soldiers who received their medals in 2000, after a study revealed discrimination that caused them to be overlooked at the time.
	Richard H. O'Kane	Navy	Commander	Philippines	October 23, 1944 – October 24, 1944	For submarine operations as commanding officer of the U.S.S. Tang operating against two enemy Japanese convoys. Maneuvering on the surface into the midst of a heavily escorted convoy, O'Kane landed hits on three tankers, swung his ship to fire at a freighter and shot out of the path of an onrushing transport. Boxed in by blazing tankers, a freighter, transport, and several destroyers, he blasted two of the targets and cleared the area. Twenty-four hours later, he made contact with another heavily escorted convoy. In the midst of relentless enemy fire, he sent two torpedoes into the first and second transports and an adjacent tanker. He charged the enemy at high speed, exploding the tanker in a burst of flame, smashing the transport dead in the water, and blasting the destroyer. He fired his last two torpedoes at the remnants of the convoy before the second torpedo malfunctioned, performing a circular run and hitting the Tang in the stern. O'Kane along with eight officers survived the sinking. He remained a Japanese prisoner-of-war until 1945.
Head and shoulders of a young man with a bright smile and neatly combed hair wearing what appears to be a graduation gown over a shirt and tie.	James K. Okubo †	Army	Technician 5th Grade	Foret Domaniale de Champ, near Biffontaine, France	October 28, 1944 – October 29, 1944 and November 4, 1944	One of 22 Asian-American soldiers who received their medals in 2000, after a study revealed discrimination that caused them to be overlooked at the time.
Head and shoulders of an elderly man wearing a white button shirt with an emblem on the left breast bearing the text "442" and "GO FOR BROKE".	Yukio Okutsu	Army	Technical Sergeant	on Mount Belvedere, Italy	April 7, 1945	One of 22 Asian-American soldiers who received their medals in 2000, after a study revealed discrimination that caused them to be overlooked at the time.
	Arlo L. Olson †	Army	Captain	crossing of the Volturno River, Italy	October 13, 1943	
—	Truman O. Olson †	Army	Sergeant	near Cisterna di Littoria, Italy	January 30, 1944 – January 31, 1944	
Head and shoulders of a young man with a garrison cap tilted over his right ear wearing a scarf tied around his neck and a military jacket with three ribbon bars and a pin on the left breast. Written over the lower right of the photo are the words "Your pal always, Frank".	Frank H. Ono †	Army	Private First Class	near Castellina, Italy	July 4, 1944	One of 22 Asian-American soldiers who received their medals in 2000, after a study revealed discrimination that caused them to be overlooked at the time.
	Nicholas Oresko	Army	Master Sergeant	near Tettingen, Germany	January 23, 1945	For single-handedly destroying two bunkers while being seriously wounded. Was oldest living Medal of Honor recipient until passing on October 4, 2013.
Head and shoulders of a young man wearing a garrison cap and a military jacket with three chevrons on the upper left sleeve and a whistle hanging from a chain attached to his right shoulder. In the top left corner of the photo is written "To Mom & Dad" and in the lower right "your son! Kazuo".	Kazuo Otani †	Army	Staff Sergeant	near Pieve Di S. Luce, Italy	July 15, 1944	One of 22 Asian-American soldiers who received their medals in 2000, after a study revealed discrimination that caused them to be overlooked at the time.
	Robert A. Owens †	Marine Corps	Sergeant	Cape Torokina, Bougainville, Solomon Islands	November 1, 1943	Charged an enemy bunker housing a 75-mm. gun which was inflicting heavy casualties on the landing force, throwing himself through the gunport, and chasing the crew out of the bunker before he was killed.
	Joseph W. Ozbourn †	Marine Corps	Private	Tinian, Mariana Islands	July 30, 1944	Private Ozbourn saved the lives of four fellow Marines by jumping on the top of a live hand grenade.

== P ==
This along with the † indicates that the Medal of Honor was awarded posthumously

Image	Name	Service	Rank	Place of action	Date of action	Notes
	Mitchell Paige	Marine Corps	Platoon Sergeant	Battle for Henderson Field, Guadalcanal, Solomon Islands	October 26, 1942	For manning several machine guns after all of his men were killed or wounded, holding off a large Japanese force before leading a bayonet charge
	John J. Parle †	Navy	Ensign	aboard a landing ship, USS LST 375, off Sicily	July 9, 1943 – July 10, 1943	
	Laverne Parrish †	Army	Technician 4th Grade	Binalonan, Luzon, Philippines	January 18, 1945 – January 24, 1945	
—	Harl Pease Jr. †	Air Forces	Captain	near Rabaul, New Britain	August 6, 1942 – August 7, 1942	
—	Forrest E. Peden †	Army	Technician 5th Grade	near Biesheim, France	February 3, 1945	Forrest Peden enlisted into the army in February 1943, and by February 3, 1945, he was serving as a Technician 5th Grade in Battery C. While in action that day, he had a traumatic experience causing death among his unit. They were ambushed by a larger enemy force. Peden ran for help even though there were enemies firing intensely upon. He ended up finding an allied tank, before leading it back to the site but died when the tank was hit by hostile fire. He received the medal for his actions to protect his unit from heavy fire.
—	Jack J. Pendleton †	Army	Staff Sergeant	Bardenberg, Germany	October 12, 1944	
	Frank D. Peregory †	Army	Technical Sergeant	Grandcampe, France	June 8, 1944	On D-Day +2, Sgt Frank D. Peregory chose to singlehandedly assault the heavily fortified and protected French village of Grandcampe-les-Bains (Point-du-Hoc Sector), Normandy. The strong point objective had previously received, firstly, a barrage from an allied cruiser off the Normandy coast, before heavy artillery and tank fire – all to no avail. It was after this that Sgt Peregory made his way up the hill (strong point approach), under heavy fire. He successfully negotiated the hill approach and entered a trench killing eight enemy and capturing three. After passing the prisoners onto command, he re-entered the trench at a point further along towards the strong point. According to witnesses in Peregory's company, after considerable time, Sgt Peregory eventually reappeared from out of the trenches with thirty-two German prisoners. Fellow soldiers who witnessed Sgt Peregory's actions, state that he had used hand grenades in the incursion (having no rifle or handgun on his person), before the remaining Germans surrendered. The 116th Infantry (of which Sgt Peregory was contingent), was reassigned two days after actions at Grandcampe-les-Bains, on the 13th June. The following day, Sgt Peregory assaulted an enemy machine gun position and was killed in action. The medal that was meant to be awarded in person, was awarded posthumously.
	Manuel Perez Jr. †	Army	Private First Class	Fort William McKinley, Luzon, Philippines	February 13, 1945	
—	George J. Peters †	Army	Private	near Fluren, Germany	March 24, 1945	
—	George Peterson †	Army	Staff Sergeant	near Eisern, Germany	March 30, 1945	
	Oscar V. Peterson †	Navy	Chief Watertender	USS Neosho, Battle of the Coral Sea	May 7, 1942	
	Frank J. Petrarca †	Army	Private First Class	Horseshoe Hill, New Georgia, Solomon Islands	July 27, 1943	
Man in navy uniform looking to the camera.	Jackson C. Pharris	Navy	Gunner	Pearl Harbor, Territory of Hawaii	December 7, 1941	In charge of an ordnance repair party on USS California, severely injured by explosions and twice rendered unconscious by nauseous oil fumes while setting up a hand-supply ammunition train for the antiaircraft guns, ordering shipfitters to counterflood to address a list (keeping the California in action), repeatedly entered flooding compartments to drag unconscious shipmates to safety.
—	Wesley Phelps †	Marine Corps	Private First Class	Peleliu Island, Palau Group	October 4, 1944	Sacrificed his life by smothering a grenade with his body
	George Phillips †	Marine Corps	Private	Iwo Jima, Volcano Islands	March 14, 1945	Sacrificed his life by smothering a grenade with his body
	Francis J. Pierce	Navy	Pharmacist's Mate First class	Iwo Jima, Volcano Islands	March 15, 1945 – March 16, 1945	Risked his life to save several wounded Marines and volunteered for a mission to eliminate an enemy threat
	John J. Pinder Jr. †	Army	Technician 5th Grade	near Colleville-sur-Mer, France	June 6, 1944	
	Everett P. Pope	Marine Corps	Captain	Peleliu Island, Palau Group	September 19, 1944 – September 20, 1944	For leading his company in the capture of a steep coral hill and holding it throughout the night despite repeated enemy attacks and the loss of most of his men
	John V. Power †	Marine Corps	First Lieutenant	Namur Island, Kwajalein Atoll, Marshall Islands	February 1, 1944	Although painfully wounded, he charged an enemy position and was killed in the doorway of a pillbox.
	John J. Powers †	Navy	Lieutenant	over the Coral Sea and adjacent waters	May 4, 1942 – May 8, 1942	
—	Leo J. Powers	Army	Private First Class	northwest of Cassino, Italy	February 3, 1944	
	Arthur M. Preston	Navy	Lieutenant	Wasile Bay, Halmahera Island	September 16, 1944	Lt. Comdr. (then Lieutenant) Preston received The Medal of Honor for conspicuous gallantry and intrepidity at the risk of his life above and beyond the call of duty as commander, Motor Torpedo Boat Squadron 33, while effecting the rescue of a Navy pilot shot down in Wasile Bay, Halmahera Island, less than 200 yards from a strongly defended Japanese dock and supply area, September 16, 1944. Volunteering for a perilous mission unsuccessfully attempted by the pilot's squadron mates and a PBY plane, Lt. Comdr. (then Lieutenant) Preston led PT-489 and PT-363 through 60 miles of restricted, heavily mined waters. Twice turned back while running the gauntlet of fire from powerful coastal defense guns guarding the 11-mile strait at the entrance to the bay, he was again turned back by furious fire in the immediate area of the downed airman. Aided by an aircraft smoke screen, he finally succeeded in reaching his objective and, under vicious fire delivered at 150-yard range, took the pilot aboard and cleared the area, sinking a small hostile cargo vessel with 40-mm. fire during retirement. Increasingly vulnerable when covering aircraft were forced to leave because of insufficient fuel, Lt. Comdr. Preston raced PT boats 489 and 363 at high speed for 20 minutes through shell-splashed water and across minefields to safety. Under continuous fire for 2 1/2 hours, Lt. Comdr. Preston successfully achieved a mission considered suicidal in its tremendous hazards, and brought his boats through without personnel casualties and with but superficial damage from shrapnel. His exceptional daring and great personal valor enhance the finest traditions of the U.S. Naval Service.
—	Ernest W. Prussman †	Army	Private First Class	near Les Coates, Brittany, France	September 8, 1944	
	Donald D. Pucket †	Air Forces	First Lieutenant	Ploiești Raid, Romania	July 9, 1944	

== R ==
This along with the † indicates that the Medal of Honor was awarded posthumously

Image	Name	Service	Rank	Place of action	Date of action	Notes
	Lawson P. Ramage	Navy	Commander	USS Parche, south of Taiwan	July 31, 1944	Sunk enemy ships in gallant action.
—	Bernard J. Ray †	Army	First Lieutenant	Hurtgen Forest near Schevenhütte, Germany	November 17, 1944	
—	James W. Reese †	Army	Private	Mt. Vassillio, Sicily	August 5, 1943	Sent mortars into enemy position in the line of fire so that his comrades can get across the hill. Shot down after the mortars were finally used up.
—	John N. Reese Jr. †	Army	Private First Class	Paco Railroad Station, Manila, Philippines	February 9, 1945	Private First Class John N. Reese Jr was engaged in the attack on the Paco Railroad Station, which was strongly defended by 300 determined enemy soldiers with machine guns and rifles, supported by several pillboxes, three 20mm. guns, one 37-mm. gun and heavy mortars. His platoon was halted 100 yards from the station by intense enemy fire. On his own initiative, he left the platoon, accompanied by a comrade, and continued forward to a house 60 yards from the objective. Although under constant enemy observation, the two men remained in this position for an hour, firing at targets of opportunity, killing more than 35 Japanese and wounding many more. Moving closer to the station and discovering a group of Japanese replacements attempting to reach pillboxes, they opened heavy fire, killed more than 40 and stopped all subsequent attempts to man the emplacements. Enemy fire became more intense as they advanced to within 20 yards of the station. From that point Pfc. Reese provided effective covering fire and courageously drew enemy fire to himself while his companion killed seven Japanese and destroyed a 20-mm. gun and heavy machine gun with hand grenades. With their ammunition running low, the two men started to return to the American lines, alternately providing covering fire for each other as they withdrew. During this movement, Pfc. Reese was killed by enemy fire as he reloaded his rifle. The intrepid team, in two and one-half hours of fierce fighting, killed more than 82 Japanese, completely disorganized their defense and paved the way for subsequent complete defeat of the enemy at this strong point.
	Thomas J. Reeves †	Navy	Chief Radioman	USS California, Pearl Harbor	December 7, 1941	After the mechanized ammunition hoists were put out of action in USS California, in a burning passageway, assisted in ammunition supply by hand to the antiaircraft guns until he was killed by smoke and fire.
	Milton E. Ricketts †	Navy	Lieutenant	USS Yorktown, Battle of the Coral Sea	May 8, 1942	
—	Paul F. Riordan †	Army	Second Lieutenant	near Cassino, Italy	February 3, 1944 – February 8, 1944	
	Ruben Rivers †	Army	Staff Sergeant	toward Guebling, France	November 15, 1944 – November 19, 1944	One of seven African-American soldiers who received their medals belatedly, after a 1993 study revealed discrimination that caused them to be overlooked at the time. From his citation "for extraordinary heroism" in an assault on German positions near Guebling, France: "Though severely wounded in the leg, Sergeant Rivers refused medical treatment and evacuation, took command of another tank, and advanced with his company in Guebling the next day. Repeatedly refusing evacuation, Sergeant Rivers continued to direct his tank's fire at enemy positions through the morning of 19 November 1944. At dawn, Company A's tanks began to advance towards Bougaktroff, but were stopped by enemy fire. Sergeant Rivers, joined by another tank, opened fire on the enemy tanks, covering company A as they withdrew. While doing so, Sergeant Rivers's tank was hit, killing him and wounding the crew."
	Charles H. Roan †	Marine Corps	Private First Class	Peleliu Island, Palau Group	September 18, 1944	Sacrificed his life by smothering a grenade with his body
Man with army uniform and service cap looking to the camera with a smirk.	James E. Robinson Jr. †	Army	First Lieutenant	near Untergriesheim, Germany	April 6, 1945	
	Cleto L. Rodriguez	Army	Private	Paco Railroad Station, Manila, Philippines	February 9, 1945	
—	Robert E. Roeder †	Army	Captain	Mt. Battaglia, Italy	September 27, 1944 – September 28, 1944	
	Albert H. Rooks †	Navy	Captain	USS Houston on the Java Sea	February 4, 1942 – February 27, 1942	Commanded USS Houston during early days of war. Led during Battle of Java Sea. Killed in action while attempting to lead Houston and HMAS Perth to safety in Sunda Strait.
	Theodore Roosevelt Jr. †	Army	Brigadier General	Utah Beach, Normandy invasion	June 6, 1944	With his father, Theodore Roosevelt, became second father and son pair to both receive the Medal of Honor. Died of a heart attack before he could receive the award.
	Donald K. Ross	Navy	Machinist	Pearl Harbor, Territory of Hawaii	December 7, 1941	Forced his men to leave the untenable forward dynamo room of USS Nevada and performed all the duties himself until unconscious, returned to dynamo room after being resuscitated, worked the after dynamo room until unconscious, recovered and returned to his station until directed to abandon it.
Man in army uniform looking to the camera.	Wilburn K. Ross	Army	Private	near St. Jacques, France	October 30, 1944	
	Carlton R. Rouh	Marine Corps	First Lieutenant	Peleliu Island, Palau Group	September 15, 1944	For risking his life by smothering a grenade with his body
	Donald E. Rudolph	Army	Technical Sergeant	Munoz, Luzon, Philippines	February 5, 1945	For destroying 8 pillboxes, a trench and a tank while under fire.
	Donald J. Ruhl †	Marine Corps	Private First Class	Iwo Jima, Volcano Islands	February 19, 1945 – February 21, 1945	Saved several of his fellow Marines by sacrificing his life and diving on an enemy grenade
	Alejandro R. Ruiz	Army	Private First Class	Okinawa, Ryukyu Islands	April 28, 1945	

== S ==
This along with the † indicates that the Medal of Honor was awarded posthumously

Image	Name	Service	Rank	Place of action	Date of action	Notes
—	Joseph J. Sadowski †	Army	Sergeant	Valhey, France	September 14, 1944	
Head and shoulders of a smiling young man wearing a peaked cap and, over a shirt and tie, a military jacket with a round pin on each lapel.	George T. Sakato	Army	Private	Hill 617, near Biffontaine, France	October 29, 1944	One of 22 Asian-American soldiers who received their medals in 2000, after a study revealed discrimination that caused them to be overlooked at the time.
—	Benjamin L. Salomon †	Army	Captain	Saipan, Mariana Islands	July 7, 1944	Ben L. Salomon was treating patients when Japanese soldiers came inside the tent, Salomon picked up a M1 Garand and shot the first one, stabbed the second one with a bayonet, stabbed the third one with a knife and butted the fourth in the stomach, who was then killed by a wounded patient with an M1911 pistol. Salomon ordered the retreat of the wounded soldiers to the nearby medical station and he gave them cover by firing a M1917 Browning machine gun at the charging Japanese soldiers. A few days later, an army team found him with 98 dead Japanese soldiers in front of his body. Salomon had 76 bullet wounds and bayonet ones, of which he had received 24 while he was still alive. After repeated recommendations were denied, he was finally awarded the medal of honor posthumously in 2002.
	Joseph R. Sarnoski †	Air Forces	Second Lieutenant	over Buka area, Solomon Islands	June 16, 1943	On 16 June 1943, 2d Lt. Sarnoski volunteered as bombardier of a crew on an important photographic mapping mission covering the defended Buka area, and Solomon Islands. When the mission was nearly completed about 20 enemy fighters got in the way. At the nose guns 2d Lt. Sarnoski fought off the first attackers, making it possible for the pilot to finish the course. When a coordinated frontal attack by the enemy severely damaged his bomber and seriously injured five of the crew, 2d Lt. Sarnoski though wounded continued to fire and shoot down two enemy planes. With his fighting spirit after he had gotten knocked down he crawled back up to his spot to continue on fighting. Second Lt. Sarnoski, by resolute the defense of his aircraft at the price of his life made it possible for the mission to be complete.
—	Foster J. Sayers †	Army	Private First Class	near Thionville, France	November 12, 1944	"During an attack on strong hostile forces entrenched on a hill he fearlessly ran up the steep approach toward his objective and set up his machine gun 20 yards from the enemy. Then he realized it would be necessary to attract full attention of the dug in Germans while his company crossed an open area and flanked the enemy, and he picked up his gun charged through the crazy machine gun and rifle fire to the very edge of the emplacement, and there killed 12 German soldiers with a devastating close range fire. He took up a position behind a log and engaged the hostile infantry from the flank in an heroic attempt to distract their attention while his comrades attained their objective at the bottom of the hill. He was killed by the very heavy concentration of return fire but his fearless assault enabled his company to sweep the hill with a minimum of casualties, killing or capturing every enemy soldier on it. Sayers's indomitable fighting spirit, aggressiveness, and supreme devotion to duty live on as an example of the highest traditions of the military service."
—	Joseph E. Schaefer	Army	Staff Sergeant	near Stolberg, Germany	September 24, 1944	
—	Henry Schauer	Army	Private First Class	near Cisterna di Littoria, Italy	May 23, 1944 – May 24, 1944	
	Herbert E. Schonland	Navy	Commander	Savo Island	November 12, 1942 – November 13, 1942	Took command of USS San Francisco after captain had been killed, fought ship and led her to safety.
	Albert E. Schwab †	Marine Corps	Private First Class	Okinawa, Ryukyu Islands	May 7, 1945	For single-handedly destroying two Japanese machine gun positions with a flamethrower before he was killed
	Donald K. Schwab †	Army	First Lieutenant	Near Lure, Haute-Saône, France	September 17, 1944	Under intense enemy fire, dismantled a strong German position and took a prisoner of war.
	Norman Scott †	Navy	Rear Admiral	off Savo Island	October 11, 1942 – October 12, 1942 and November 12, 1942 – November 13, 1942	
	Robert R. Scott †	Navy	Machinist's Mate First class	Pearl Harbor, Hawaii	December 7, 1941	When his battle station compartment flooded on USS California, site of an air compressor for the guns, Scott refused to leave as "This is my station and I will stay and give them air as long as the guns are going."
	Robert S. Scott	Army	First Lieutenant	near Munda Air Strip, New Georgia, Solomon Islands	July 29, 1943	For single-handedly defeating a Japanese patrol.
—	Charles W. Shea	Army	Second Lieutenant	near Mount Damiano, Italy	May 12, 1944	
—	Carl V. Sheridan †	Army	Private First Class	Frenzenberg Castle, Weisweiler, Germany	November 26, 1944	
	William R. Shockley †	Army	Private First Class	Villa Verde Trail, Luzon, Philippines	March 31, 1945	
	William A. Shomo	Air Forces	Major	over Luzon, Philippines	January 11, 1945	7 victories in one action
—	Curtis F. Shoup †	Army	Staff Sergeant	near Tillet, Belgium	January 7, 1945	
	David M. Shoup	Marine Corps	Colonel	Betio Island, Tarawa Atoll, Gilbert Islands	November 20, 1943 – November 22, 1943	Wrote battle plan for Tarawa assault, directed assault from trench on Betio beach as first waves came ashore. Twenty-second Commandant of the United States Marine Corps (January 1, 1960 – December 31, 1963)
	Franklin E. Sigler	Marine Corps	Private	Iwo Jima, Volcano Islands	March 14, 1945	Led a charge against an enemy gun installation which had held up the advance of his company for several days
—	Edward A. Silk	Army	First Lieutenant	near St. Pravel, France	November 23, 1944	
—	John C. Sjogren	Army	Staff Sergeant	near San Jose Hacienda, Negros, Philippines	May 23, 1945	
	Luther Skaggs Jr.	Marine Corps	Private First Class	Asan-Adelup beachhead, Guam, Mariana Islands	July 21, 1944 – July 22, 1944	Despite losing part of his leg to a grenade, he continued to maintain his position in his foxhole, fighting the enemy for eight more hours
—	James D. Slaton	Army	Corporal	near Oliveto, Italy	September 23, 1943	
—	Furman L. Smith †	Army	Private	near Lanuvio, Italy	May 31, 1944	
	John L. Smith	Marine Corps	Major	Solomon Islands area	August 1942 – September 1942	Led his squadron in shooting down 83 enemy aircraft during this period, he himself shot down 19 planes
	Maynard H. Smith	Air Forces	Sergeant	over Brest, France	May 1, 1943	AKA- Snuffy Smith. On his first mission as a B-17 gunner Sgt. Smith helped save the lives of six of his wounded comrades, put out a fire, and drove off waves of German fighters.
Head and shoulders of a white man wearing a garrison cap tilted over his right ear and a military jacket with a badge and two ribbon bars on the left breast.	William A. Soderman	Army	Private First Class	near Rocherath, Belgium	December 17, 1944	
	Richard K. Sorenson	Marine Corps	Private	Namur Island, Kwajalein Atoll, Marshall Islands	February 1, 1944 – February 2, 1944	For risking his life by smothering a grenade with his body
—	Joe C. Specker †	Army	Sergeant	Mount Porchia, Italy	January 7, 1944	
	Junior J. Spurrier	Army	Staff Sergeant	Achain, France	November 13, 1944	
Man in army uniform looking to the side.	John C. Squires †	Army	Private First Class	near Padiglione, Italy	April 23, 1944 – April 24, 1944	
	Tony Stein †	Marine Corps	Corporal	Iwo Jima, Volcano Islands	February 19, 1945	First Medal of Honor of Iwo Jima
	George L. Street, III	Navy	Lieutenant Commander	harbor of Quelpart Island, off the coast of Korea	April 14, 1945	For torpedoing three enemy ships while captain of USS Triante.
Man with army uniform with tilted to side looking at camera.	Stuart S. Stryker †	Army	Private First Class	near Wesel, Germany	March 24, 1945	
	James E. Swett	Marine Corps	First Lieutenant	Solomon Islands area	April 7, 1943	For downing eight Japanese Vals off the coast of Guadalcanal

== T ==
This along with the † indicates that the Medal of Honor was awarded posthumously

Image	Name	Service	Rank	Place of action	Date of action	Notes
Head and torso of a serious faced man wearing a garrison cap and a military jacket with bright buttons and a patch and stripes on the upper sleeve.	Ted T. Tanouye †	Army	Technical Sergeant	near Molino A Ventoabbto, Italy	July 7, 1944	One of 22 Asian-American soldiers who received their medals in 2000, after a study revealed discrimination that caused them to be overlooked at the time.
—	Seymour W. Terry †	Army	Captain	Zebra Hill, Okinawa, Ryukyu Islands	May 11, 1945	
	Charles L. Thomas †	Army	First Lieutenant	near Climbach, France	December 14, 1944	One of seven African-American soldiers who received their awards belatedly, after a 1993 study revealed discrimination that caused them to be overlooked at the time.
	Herbert J. Thomas †	Marine Corps	Sergeant	Koromokina River, Bougainville, Solomon Islands	November 7, 1943	Sacrificed his life by smothering a grenade with his body
—	William H. Thomas †	Army	Private First Class	Zambales Mountains, Luzon, Philippines	April 22, 1945	
	Clyde A. Thomason †	Marine Corps	Sergeant	Makin Atoll	August 17, 1942 – August 18, 1942	For leading Marines during the Makin Island raid. He was the first enlisted Marine to be awarded the Medal of Honor for actions during World War II.
	Max Thompson	Army	Sergeant	near Haaren, Germany	October 18, 1944	
—	Horace M. Thorne †	Army	Corporal	near Grufflingen, Belgium	December 21, 1944	
—	John F. Thorson †	Army	Private First Class	Dagami, Leyte, Philippines	October 28, 1944	
	Grant F. Timmerman †	Marine Corps	Sergeant	Saipan, Mariana Islands	July 8, 1944	Sacrificed his life to prevent an enemy grenade from falling through the open hatch of his tank
	Peter Tomich †	Navy	Chief Watertender	USS Utah (BB-31), Pearl Harbor, Hawaii	December 7, 1941	Although realizing that USS Utah was capsizing, remained at his post in the engineering plant until he saw that all boilers were secured and all fireroom personnel had left their stations.
—	John J. Tominac	Army	First Lieutenant	Saulx de Vesoul, France	September 12, 1944	
	John R. Towle †	Army	Private	near Oosterhout, Holland	September 21, 1944	
	Jack L. Treadwell	Army	First Lieutenant	near Nieder-Wurzbach, Germany	March 18, 1945	
	Walter E. Truemper †	Air Forces	Second Lieutenant	over Germany	February 20, 1944	
—	Day G. Turner †	Army	Sergeant	Dahl, Luxembourg	January 8, 1945	
	George B. Turner	Army	Private First Class	Philippsbourg, France	January 3, 1945 – January 4, 1945	

== U ==
Image	Name	Service	Rank	Place of action	Date of action	Notes
	Matt Urban	Army	Captain	Renouf, France	June 14, 1944 – September 3, 1944	An infantry company and battalion commander with many decorations and awards including seven Purple Hearts in World War II: "Distinguished himself by a series of bold, heroic actions, exemplified by a singularly outstanding combat leadership, personal bravery, and tenacious devotion to duty... Captain Urban's personal leadership, limitless bravery, and repeated extraordinary exposure to enemy fire served as an inspiration to his entire battalion. His valourous and intrepid actions reflect the utmost credit on him and uphold the noble traditions of the United States Army."

== V ==
This along with the † indicates that the Medal of Honor was awarded posthumously

Image	Name	Service	Rank	Place of action	Date of action	Notes
	Jose F. Valdez †	Army	Private First Class	near Rosenkrantz, France	January 25, 1945	
Man with army uniform looking at camera.	Junior Van Noy †	Army	Private	near Finschafen, New Guinea	October 17, 1943	
	Franklin Van Valkenburgh †	Navy	Captain	Pearl Harbor, Hawaii	December 7, 1941	Commanding officer of the USS Arizona.
Man in dress whites navy uniform looking to the camera.	Bruce A. Van Voorhis †	Navy	Commander	Greenwich Island, battle of the Solomon Islands	July 6, 1943	His citation reads as follows: "For conspicuous gallantry and intrepidity at the risk of his life above and beyond the call of duty as Squadron Commander of Bombing Squadron 102 and as Plane Commander of a PB4Y-I Patrol Bomber operating against the enemy on Japanese-held Greenwich Island during the battle of the Solomon Islands, 6 July 1943. Fully aware of the limited chance of surviving an urgent mission, voluntarily undertaken to prevent a surprise Japanese attack against our forces, Lieutenant Commander Van Voorhis took off in total darkness on a perilous 700-mile flight without escort or support. Successful in reaching his objective despite treacherous and varying winds, low visibility and difficult terrain, he fought a lone but relentless battle under fierce antiaircraft fire and overwhelming aerial opposition. Forced lower and lower by pursuing planes, he coolly persisted in his mission of destruction. Abandoning all chance of a safe return he executed 6 bold ground-level attacks to demolish the enemy's vital radio station, installations, antiaircraft guns and crews with bombs and machine gun fire, and to destroy 1 fighter plane in the air and 3 on the water. Caught in his own bomb blast, Commander Van Voorhis crashed into the lagoon off the beach, sacrificing himself in a single-handed fight against almost insuperable odds, to make a distinctive contribution to our continued offensive in driving the Japanese from the Solomons and, by his superb daring, courage and resoluteness of purpose, enhanced the finest traditions of the U.S. Naval Service. He gallantly gave his life for his country."
	Leon R. Vance Jr. †	Air Forces	Lieutenant Colonel	over Wimereaux, France	June 5, 1944	Died in unrelated air crash before receiving his Medal.
	Alexander A. Vandegrift	Marine Corps	Major General	Battle of Guadalcanal, Solomon Islands	August 7, 1942 – December 9, 1942	Later became the 18th Commandant of the Marine Corps.
	Robert M. Viale †	Army	Second Lieutenant	Manila, Luzon, Philippines	February 5, 1945	
	Ysmael R. Villegas †	Army	Staff Sergeant	Villa Verde Trail, Luzon, Philippines	March 20, 1945	
—	Dirk J. Vlug	Army	Private First Class	near Limon, Leyte, Philippines	December 15, 1944	
	Forrest L. Vosler	Air Forces	Technical Sergeant	over Bremen, Germany	December 20, 1943	

== W ==
This along with the † indicates that the Medal of Honor was awarded posthumously

Image	Name	Service	Rank	Place of action	Date of action	Notes
	George E. Wahlen	Navy	Pharmacist's Mate Second class	Iwo Jima, Volcano Islands	March 3, 1945	Although seriously wounded he risked his life to save the lives of several Marines
	Francis B. Wai †	Army	Captain	Leyte, Philippines	October 20, 1944	Deliberately exposed himself to fire from Japanese pillboxes and led men on the beachhead; was killed in assault on last pillbox. One of 22 Asian-American soldiers who received their medals in 2000, after a study revealed discrimination that caused them to be overlooked at the time.
	Jonathan M. Wainwright IV	Army	Lieutenant General	Philippines	March 12, 1942 – May 7, 1942	Wainwright commanded the doomed Allied garrison of Corregidor and ordered its surrender to Japanese forces in 1942. He was the highest ranking U.S. officer in captivity during his three years as a prisoner of war. The general would witness the surrender of the Japanese forces aboard the USS Missouri that brought about the end of the war. Wainwright was nominated for the Medal of Honor early in his captivity, but it was rejected due to the opposition of General Douglas MacArthur, who felt that Corregidor should not have been surrendered. MacArthur did not oppose the renewed proposal in 1945.
	Kenneth N. Walker †	Air Forces	Brigadier General	Rabaul, New Britain	January 5, 1943	For Conspicuous Leadership above and beyond the call of Duty
—	Herman C. Wallace †	Army	Private First Class	near Prümzurlay, Germany	February 27, 1945	
	Kenneth A. Walsh	Marine Corps	First Lieutenant	Solomon Islands area	August 15, 1943 and August 30, 1943	One of the top Marine fighter aces of the war with 21 kills
	William G. Walsh †	Marine Corps	Gunnery Sergeant	Iwo Jima, Volcano Islands	February 27, 1945	For leading his Marines in a fierce assault on an enemy held ridge before he sacrificed his life by smothering a grenade with his body
	James R. Ward †	Navy	Seaman First Class	Pearl Harbor, Hawaii	December 7, 1941	During evacuation of USS Oklahoma, remained in a turret, holding a flashlight so the remainder of the turret crew could see to escape, thereby sacrificing his own life.
	Keith L. Ware	Army	Lieutenant Colonel	near Sigolsheim, France	December 26, 1944	
—	Henry F. Warner †	Army	Corporal	near Dom Butgenbach, Belgium	December 20, 1944 – December 21, 1944	
	George Watson †	Army	Private	at sea near New Guinea	March 8, 1943	Watson was one of seven African-American soldiers who received their medals in a belated 1997 ceremony, after a study revealed discrimination that caused them to be overlooked at the time.
	Wilson D. Watson	Marine Corps	Private	Iwo Jima, Volcano Islands	February 26, 1945 – February 27, 1945	Risked his life fighting the enemy single-handedly for 15 minutes until his platoon could catch up to him, personally killing 60 of the enemy
—	Robert T. Waugh †	Army	First Lieutenant	near Tremensucli, Italy	May 11, 1944 – May 14, 1944	
	David C. Waybur	Army	First Lieutenant	near Agrigento, Sicily	July 17, 1943	Led his patrol in holding off an Italian tank attack despite severe wounds. He later returned to combat and was killed in 1945
—	Ellis R. Weicht †	Army	Sergeant	St. Hippolyte, France	December 3, 1944	
—	Walter C. Wetzel †	Army	Private First Class	Birken, Germany	April 3, 1945	
—	Eli L. Whiteley	Army	First Lieutenant	Sigolsheim, France	December 27, 1944	
—	Hulon B. Whittington	Army	Sergeant	near Grimesnil, France	July 29, 1944	
—	Paul J. Wiedorfer	Army	Private	near, Chaumont, Belgium	December 25, 1944	
—	Thomas W. Wigle †	Army	Second Lieutenant	Monte Frassino, Italy	September 14, 1944	
Man with army uniform with medal of honor.	William H. Wilbur	Army	Colonel	Fedala, Morocco	November 8, 1942	
—	Edward G. Wilkin †	Army	Corporal	Siegfried Line in Germany	March 18, 1945	
	Raymond H. Wilkins †	Air Forces	Major	near Rabaul, New Britain	November 2, 1943	
—	Walter J. Will †	Army	First Lieutenant	near Eisern, Germany	March 30, 1945	Despite being wounded numerous times: rescued three wounded men, single-handedly neutralized two enemy machine gun nests, and went on to lead his squad to capture two more before being killed in another charge.
	Hershel W. Williams	Marine Corps	Corporal	Iwo Jima, Volcano Islands	February 23, 1945	A demolition sergeant, Williams volunteered to advance alone and attempt to silence enemy positions. Returning periodically to collect more demolition charges and refueled flamethrowers, Williams systematically destroyed enemy pillboxes and emplacements, engaging in near hand-to-hand combat. Williams was the last surviving World War II medal of honor winner until his death on June 29, 2022.
	Jack Williams †	Navy	Pharmacist's Mate Third class	Iwo Jima, Volcano Islands	March 3, 1945	Navy Corpsman who risked his life charging through enemy fire to rescue wounded comrades. Wounded several times, Williams neglected his own wounds to care for the wounded Marines around him, exposing himself to enemy fire.
	John H. Willis †	Navy	Pharmacist's Mate First class	Iwo Jima, Volcano Islands	February 28, 1945	During a heated battle, Willis, while wounded himself, advanced to the aid of a wounded Marine. While administering plasma to the Marine, he quickly hurled back an enemy grenade that landed in their shell hole. He returned the seven others that followed as well, before a ninth exploded in his hand, killing him instantly.
	Alfred L. Wilson †	Army	Technician 5th Grade	near Bezange la Petite, France	November 8, 1944	Volunteered as an aid man to assist another company that was taking heavy casualties. Mortally wounded by a shell that burst among him and the wounded men he was treating, he continued to provide aid to those injured while refusing it himself. As blood loss made him too weak to walk or crawl, he directed enlisted men on how to treat the wounded, before succumbing to his injuries.
	Louis H. Wilson Jr.	Marine Corps	Captain	Fonte Hill, Guam, Mariana Islands	July 25, 1944 – July 26, 1944	Later became commandant of the Marine Corps.
	Robert L. Wilson †	Marine Corps	Private First Class	Tinian, Mariana Islands	August 3, 1944	Sacrificed himself by jumping on an enemy grenade that landed among his squad.
	Homer L. Wise	Army	Staff Sergeant	Magliano, Italy	June 14, 1944	
	Frank P. Witek †	Marine Corps	Private First Class	Battle of Finegayen, Guam, Mariana Islands	August 3, 1944	For knocking out several enemy positions, killing 16 Japanese soldiers before he was killed.
—	Howard E. Woodford †	Army	Staff Sergeant	near Tabio, Luzon, Philippines	June 6, 1945	By daring, skillful, and inspiring leadership, as well as by gallant determination to search out and kill the enemy, led an inexperienced unit in capturing and securing a vital objective, and was responsible for the successful continuance of a vitally important general advance. Transport ship named after him.

== Y ==
This along with the † indicates that the Medal of Honor was awarded posthumously

Image	Name	Service	Rank	Place of action	Date of action	Notes
Head of middle-aged white man wearing a white jacket with black shoulderboards and a white peaked cap with a black visor.	Cassin Young	Navy	Commander	USS Vestal, Pearl Harbor, Territory of Hawaii	December 7, 1941	Moved his ship, the USS Vestal, away from the battleship USS Arizona, and subsequently beached it upon determining that such action was required to save his ship.
Head and shoulders of a smiling young white man wearing a peaked cap, wire-framed glasses, and, over a shirt and tie, a jacket adorned with pins on the lapels, stripes and a round badge on the shoulder, and a whistle on a chain hanging from a shoulder button.	Rodger W. Young †	Army	Private	New Georgia, Solomon Islands	July 31, 1943	After being pinned by enemy fire for a long time, he single-handedly attacked and destroyed an enemy machine-gun pillbox, although he died of his injuries right afterwards. His actions helped the rest of the unit return to base without taking any more casualties.

== Z ==
This along with the † indicates that the Medal of Honor was awarded posthumously

Image	Name	Service	Rank	Place of action	Date of action	Notes
Head and shoulders of a man with wavy hair wearing a military jacket with rows of ribbon bars and a winged pin on his left breast, pins on the lapels, and a star-shaped medal hanging from a ribbon around his neck.	Jay Zeamer Jr.	Air Forces	Captain	over Buka area, Solomon Islands	June 16, 1943	Volunteered as pilot of a B-17 bomber on an important photographic mapping mission covering the formidably defended area in the vicinity of Buka, Solomon Islands
Man with army uniform looking to the side smiling.	Raymond Zussman †	Army	Second Lieutenant	Noroy le Bourg, France	September 12, 1944	In lead of a tank killed 18 enemy soldiers and captured 92

† N.B. A † in the citation indicates that the award was given posthumously.

== See also ==
- The Unknown American Soldier from World War II
