= Thomas W. Wigle =

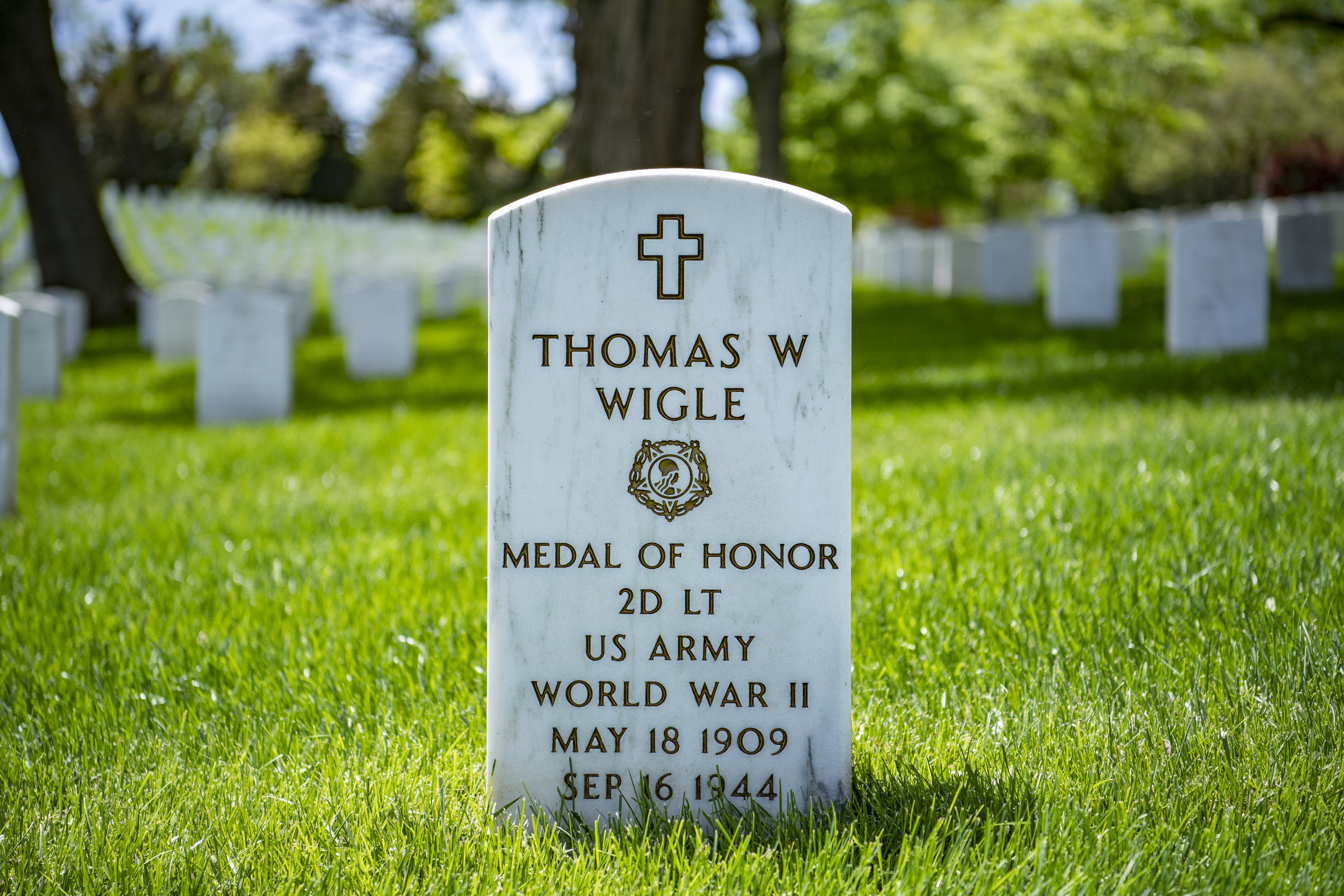
- Grave at Arlington National Cemetery
- Born: May 18, 1909; Indianapolis, Indiana, US
- Died: September 16, 1944 (aged 35) near Monte Frassino, Italy
- Burial place: Arlington National Cemetery
- Relatives: Father; Archibald Palmer Wigle (Artist), Wife; Margaret Wigle, Daughter; Diana Astra Wigle-Czar. 5 grandchildren, 13 great grandchildren, 10 great-great-grandchildren
- Military career
- Allegiance: United States of America
- Branch: United States Army
- Rank: Second Lieutenant
- Units: 135th Infantry Regiment, 34th Infantry Division
- Conflicts: World War II
- Awards: Medal of Honor

Thomas W. Wigle (May 18, 1909 – September 16, 1944) was a United States Army officer and a recipient of the United States military's highest decoration—the Medal of Honor—for his actions in World War II. Prior to enlisting, he was a concert violinist with the Kansas City Philharmonic.

== Biography ==
Wigle was born May 18, 1909 in Indianapolis, Indiana. He graduated from Northwestern High School in Detroit, Michigan, and attended Michigan State College for two years.

Wigle joined the Army from Detroit, Michigan, and by September 14, 1944 was serving as a second lieutenant in Company K, 135th Infantry Regiment, 34th Infantry Division. On that day, in Monte Frassino, Italy, Wigle assumed command of a platoon and led an assault on a heavily fortified German position. He single-handedly attacked three German-held houses before being wounded. He died of his wounds two days later and, on February 7, 1945, was posthumously awarded the Medal of Honor.

Wigle, aged 35 at his death, was buried at Arlington National Cemetery, Arlington County, Virginia.

== Medal of Honor citation ==
Second Lieutenant Wigle's official Medal of Honor citation reads:

For conspicuous gallantry and intrepidity at the risk of life above and beyond the call of duty in the vicinity of Monte Frassino, Italy. The 3d Platoon, in attempting to seize a strongly fortified hill position protected by 3 parallel high terraced stone walls, was twice thrown back by the withering crossfire. 2d Lt. Wigle, acting company executive, observing that the platoon was without an officer, volunteered to command it on the next attack. Leading his men up the bare, rocky slopes through intense and concentrated fire, he succeeded in reaching the first of the stone walls. Having himself boosted to the top and perching there in full view of the enemy, he drew and returned their fire while his men helped each other up and over. Following the same method, he successfully negotiated the second. Upon reaching the top of the third wall, he faced 3 houses which were the key point of the enemy defense. Ordering his men to cover him, he made a dash through a hail of machine-pistol fire to reach the nearest house. Firing his carbine as he entered, he drove the enemy before him out of the back door and into the second house. Following closely on the heels of the foe, he drove them from this house into the third where they took refuge in the cellar. When his men rejoined him, they found him mortally wounded on the cellar stairs which he had started to descend to force the surrender of the enemy. His heroic action resulted in the capture of 36 German soldiers and the seizure of the strongpoint.

== See also ==
- List of Medal of Honor recipients
- List of Medal of Honor recipients for World War II
