= Raymond O. Beaudoin =

United States Army Medal of Honor recipient (1918–1945)

Raymond Ovila Beaudoin
- Born: July 15, 1918; Holyoke, Massachusetts, U.S.
- Died: April 6, 1945 (aged 26); Hamelin, Free State of Prussia, Nazi Germany
- Burial place: Notre Dame Cemetery, South Hadley, Massachusetts
- Military career
- Allegiance: United States of America
- Branch: United States Army
- Service years: 1941 - 1945
- Rank: First Lieutenant
- Unit: 119th Infantry Regiment
- Conflicts: World War II: Western Front; Western Allied invasion of Germany †
- Awards: Medal of Honor

Raymond Ovila Beaudoin (July 15, 1918 – April 6, 1945) was a United States Army officer and a recipient of the United States military's highest decoration, the Medal of Honor, for his actions in World War II.

== Biography ==
Beaudoin was born in Holyoke, Massachusetts, and was serving as a first lieutenant in the U.S. Army near Hamelin, Germany, on April 6, 1945. He was leading his platoon over the open ground when all were pinned down by a devastating curtain of fire from enemy machineguns and automatic weapons. By rotating his men in firing position, Beaudoin enabled his platoon to dig in against the numerically superior force and inflict heavy casualties on it. However, enemy reinforcements made the platoon's position precarious. In order to allow a runner to secure help, Lieutenant Beaudoin decided to make a one-man charge on the most dangerous sniper nest some 90 yards (82 m) away. Despite a barrage of rifle and bazooka fire, he reached the nest and wiped out three of its inhabitants, the fourth falling from covering fire from the American platoon. Continuing the attack, Lieutenant Beaudoin charged a dugout but was killed by a blast of machinegun fire. The runner was able to secure help, however; and the platoon was saved. For the supreme sacrifice which he made in saving the lives of the men under him, Lieutenant Beaudoin was posthumously awarded the Medal of Honor.

== Medal of Honor citation ==
Rank and organization: First Lieutenant, U.S. Army, Company F, 119th Infantry, 30th Infantry Division. Place and date: Hamelin, Germany, 6 April 1945. Entered service at: Holyoke, Mass. Birth: Holyoke, Mass. G.O. No.: 9, 25 January 1946.

Citation:

First Lieutenant Raymond O. Beaudoin was leading the 2d Platoon of Company F, 119th Infantry, on April 6, 1945 over flat, open terrain to Hamelin, Germany, when the enemy went into action with machineguns and automatic weapons, laying down a devastating curtain of fire which pinned his unit to the ground. By rotating men in firing positions he made it possible for his entire platoon to dig in, defying all the while the murderous enemy fire to encourage his men and to distribute ammunition.

He then dug in himself at the most advanced position, where he kept up a steady fire, killing 6 hostile soldiers, and directing his men in inflicting heavy casualties on the numerically superior opposing force.

Despite these defensive measures, however, the position of the platoon became more precarious, for the enemy had brought up strong reinforcements and was preparing a counterattack. Three men, sent back at intervals to obtain ammunition and reinforcements, were killed by sniper fire.

To relieve his command from the desperate situation, Lieutenant Beaudoin decided to make a one-man attack on the most damaging enemy sniper nest 90 yards to the right flank, and thereby divert attention from the runner who would attempt to pierce the enemy's barrier of bullets and secure help.

Crawling over the completely exposed ground, he relentlessly advanced, undeterred by eight rounds of bazooka fire which threw mud and stones over him or by rifle fire which ripped his uniform. Ten yards from the enemy position he stood up and charged.

At point-blank range he shot and killed two occupants of the nest; a third, who tried to bayonet him, he overpowered and killed with the butt of his carbine; and the fourth adversary was cut down by the platoon's rifle fire as he attempted to flee.

He continued his attack by running toward a dugout, but there he was struck and killed by a burst from a machinegun.

By his intrepidity, great fighting skill, and supreme devotion to his responsibility for the well-being of his platoon, 1st Lt. Beaudoin single-handedly accomplished a mission that enabled a messenger to secure help which saved the stricken unit and made possible the decisive defeat of the German forces.

== See also ==
- List of Medal of Honor recipients
- List of Medal of Honor recipients for World War II
