= Furman L. Smith =

United States Army Medal of Honor recipient (1925–1944)

- Born: May 11, 1925; Six Mile, South Carolina
- Died: June 1, 1944 (aged 19) near Lanuvio, Italy
- Burial place: Pleasant Hill Cemetery in Central, South Carolina
- Military career
- Allegiance: United States of America
- Branch: United States Army
- Service years: 1943 - 1944
- Rank: Private First Class
- Units: Company L, 3rd Battalion, 135th Infantry Regiment, 34th Infantry Division
- Conflicts: World War II
- Awards: Medal of Honor

Furman L. Smith (May 11, 1925 – June 1, 1944) was a United States Army soldier and a recipient of the United States military's highest decoration—the Medal of Honor—for his actions in World War II.

== Biography ==
Smith joined the Army from Six Mile, South Carolina in July 1943, and by May 31, 1944, was serving as a private in the 135th Infantry Regiment, 34th Infantry Division. During a battle on that day, near Lanuvio, Italy, his group came under intense German attack and began to withdraw. Smith voluntarily stayed behind with the wounded and protected them until he was overrun and killed. He was posthumously awarded the Medal of Honor eight months later, on January 24, 1945.

Smith, aged 19 at his death, was buried at Pleasant Hill Cemetery in Central, South Carolina.

== Medal of Honor citation ==
Private Smith's official Medal of Honor citation reads:

For conspicuous gallantry and intrepidity at the risk of his life above and beyond the call of duty. In its attack on a strong point, an infantry company was held up by intense enemy fire. The group to which Pvt. Smith belonged was far in the lead when attacked by a force of 80 Germans. The squad leader and 1 other man were seriously wounded and other members of the group withdrew to the company position, but Pvt. Smith refused to leave his wounded comrades. He placed them in the shelter of shell craters and then alone faced a strong enemy counterattack, temporarily checking it by his accurate rifle fire at close range, killing and wounding many of the foe. Against overwhelming odds, he stood his ground until shot down and killed, rifle in hand.

For more information on his biography, read : http://tigerprints.clemson.edu/cgi/viewcontent.cgi?article=1756&context=all_theses

== Awards and Decorations ==

Badge	Combat Infantryman Badge		
1st row	Medal of Honor		
2nd row	Bronze Star Medal Retroactively Awarded, 1947	Purple Heart	Army Good Conduct Medal
3rd row	American Campaign Medal	European–African–Middle Eastern Campaign Medal with 1 Campaign star	World War II Victory Medal

34th Infantry Division Insignia

== See also ==
- List of Medal of Honor recipients
- List of Medal of Honor recipients for World War II
