= Robert E. Gerstung =

United States Army soldier (1915–1979)

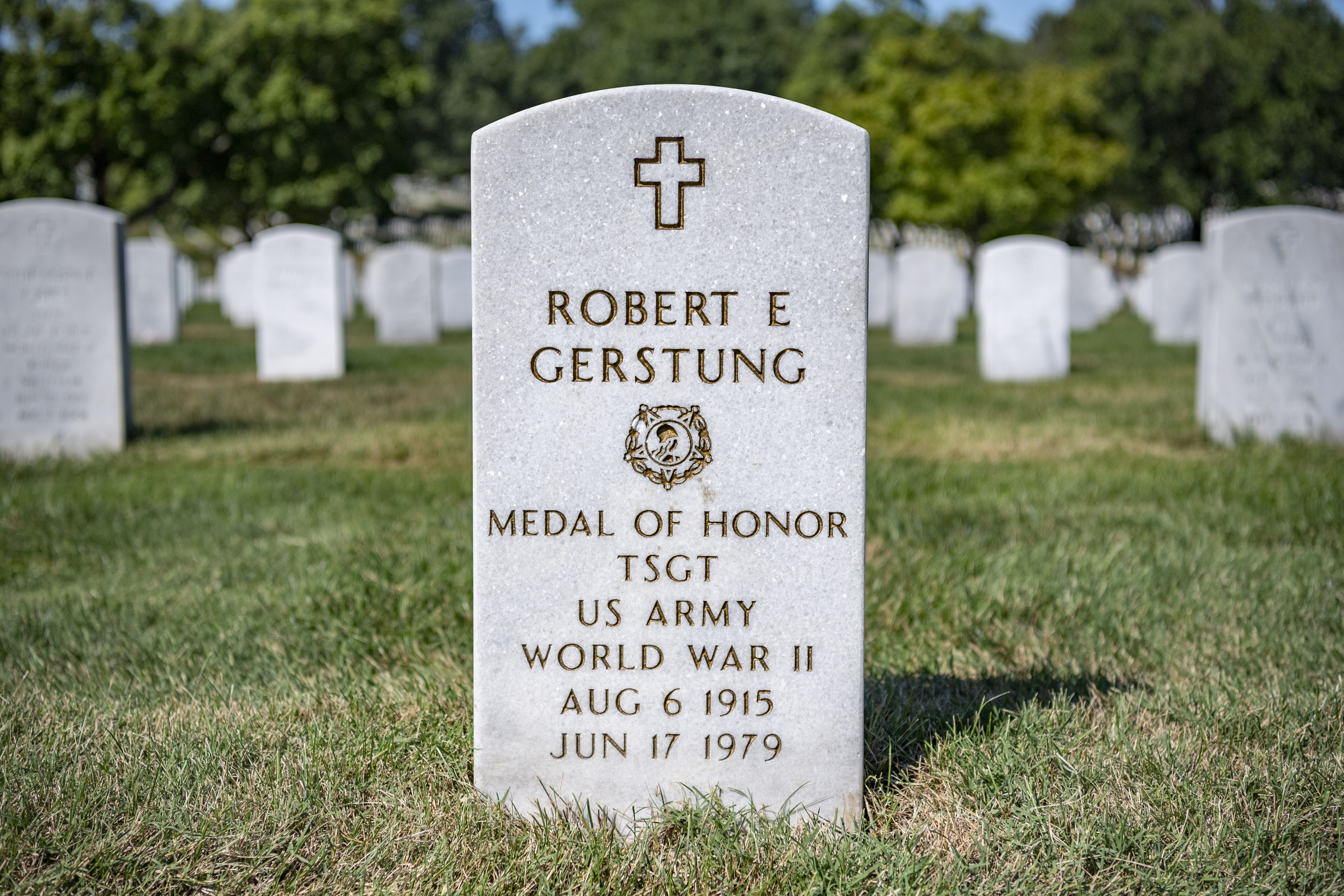
- Grave at Arlington National Cemetery
- Born: August 6, 1915; Chicago, Illinois, US
- Died: June 17, 1979 (aged 63); Chicago, Illinois, US
- Burial place: Arlington National Cemetery
- Military career
- Allegiance: United States of America
- Branch: United States Army
- Rank: Technical Sergeant
- Units: 313th Infantry Regiment, 79th Infantry Division
- Conflicts: World War II
- Awards: Medal of Honor

Robert E. Gerstung (August 6, 1915 – June 17, 1979) was a United States Army soldier and a recipient of the United States military's highest decoration—the Medal of Honor—for his actions in World War II.

== Biography ==
Gerstung joined the Army from his birth city of Chicago, Illinois, and by December 19, 1944, was serving as a technical sergeant in Company H, 313th Infantry Regiment, 79th Infantry Division. On that day, near Berg, Germany, he manned a machine gun in support of an infantry assault on the Siegfried Line. He remained at his gun despite intense enemy fire, even after all other men in his squad were killed or wounded. He crossed open terrain to retrieve more ammunition, commandeered another machine gun after his first was disabled by hostile fire, and, when the order came to withdraw, he remained behind to cover the infantry's retreat. Gerstung was wounded while trying to return to friendly lines, but managed to drag himself and his machine gun to safety. He recovered from his wounds and, on September 5, 1945, was awarded the Medal of Honor for his actions.

Gerstung left the Army while still a technical sergeant. He died at age 63 and was buried in Arlington National Cemetery, Arlington County, Virginia.

== Medal of Honor citation ==
Technical Sergeant Gerstung's official Medal of Honor citation reads:

On 19 December 1944 he was ordered with his heavy machinegun squad to the support of an infantry company attacking the outer defense of the Siegfried Line near Berg, Germany. For 8 hours he maintained a position made almost untenable by the density of artillery and mortar fire concentrated upon it and the proximity of enemy troops who threw hand grenades into the emplacement. While all other members of his squad became casualties, he remained at his gun. When he ran out of ammunition, he fearlessly dashed across bullet-swept, open terrain to secure a new supply from a disabled friendly tank. A fierce barrage pierced the water jacket of his gun, but he continued to fire until the weapon overheated and jammed. Instead of withdrawing, he crawled 50 yards across coverless ground to another of his company's machineguns which had been silenced when its entire crew was killed. He continued to man this gun, giving support vitally needed by the infantry. At one time he came under direct fire from a hostile tank, which shot the glove from his hand with an armor-piercing shell but could not drive him from his position or stop his shooting. When the American forces were ordered to retire to their original positions, he remained at his gun, giving the only covering fire. Finally withdrawing, he cradled the heavy weapon in his left arm, slung a belt of ammunition over his shoulder, and walked to the rear, loosing small bursts at the enemy as he went. One hundred yards from safety, he was struck in the leg by a mortar shell; but, with a supreme effort, he crawled the remaining distance, dragging along the gun which had served him and his comrades so well. By his remarkable perseverance, indomitable courage, and heroic devotion to his task in the face of devastating fire, T/Sgt. Gerstung gave his fellow soldiers powerful support in their encounter with formidable enemy forces.

== Awards and decorations ==

Badge	Combat Infantryman Badge		
1st row	Medal of Honor		
2nd row	Bronze Star Medal	Purple Heart	Army Good Conduct Medal
3rd row	American Campaign Medal	European–African–Middle Eastern Campaign Medal with 1 campaign star	World War II Victory Medal

== See also ==
- List of Medal of Honor recipients
- List of Medal of Honor recipients for World War II
