= George Phillips =

George Phillips may refer to:

== Military ==
- George Phillips (USMC) (1926–1945), US Marine and Medal of Honor recipient
- George Frederick Phillips (1862–1904), Spanish–American War Medal of Honor recipient

== Politics ==
- George Phillips (Australian politician) (1843–1921), surveyor and member of the Queensland Legislative Assembly
- George Lort Phillips (1811–1866), British member of parliament
- George A. Phillips (1853–1921), American medical doctor and politician from Maine

== Religion ==
- George Phillips (Watertown) (died 1644), seventeenth-century American religious leader and founder of Watertown, Massachusetts
- George Phillips (orientalist) (1804–1892), English churchman, orientalist and mathematician
- George Phillips (priest), archdeacon in the Diocese of Rupert's Land

== Other ==
- George Phillips (canon lawyer) (1804–1872), German canon lawyer
- George Phillips (American football) (1921–1994), American football player
- George Bagster Phillips (1835–1897), London police surgeon
- G. Godfrey Phillips (1900–1965), British barrister and the Commissioner General of the Shanghai Municipal Council
- George N. Phillips, Scientist and Professor

== See also ==
- George Philips (disambiguation)
- George Philip (disambiguation)
