= Donald J. Ruhl =

US Marine Corps Medal of Honor recipient (1923–1945)

Donald Jack Ruhl
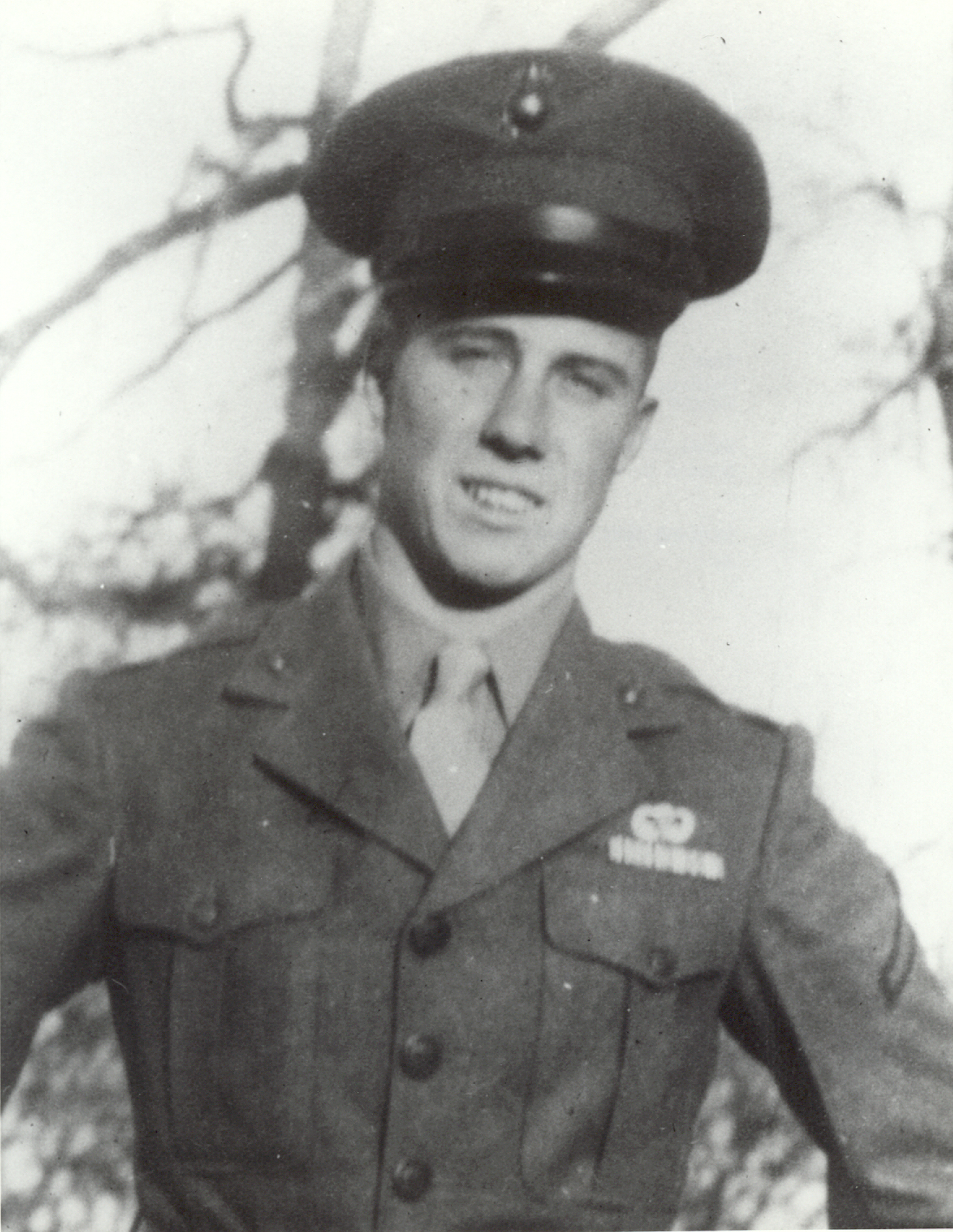
- Donald J. Ruhl, posthumous Medal of Honor recipient
- Born: July 2, 1923; Columbus, Montana, U.S.
- Died: February 21, 1945 (aged 21); Iwo Jima, Volcano Islands, Japanese Empire
- Burial place: Donald Jack Ruhl Cemetery, Greybull, Wyoming
- Military career
- Allegiance: United States of America
- Branch: United States Marine Corps
- Service years: 1942–1945
- Rank: Private First Class
- Units: 3rd Parachute Battalion; Company E, 2nd Battalion, 28th Marines, 5th Marine Division
- Conflicts: World War II; Bougainville campaign; Battle of Iwo Jima †
- Awards: Medal of Honor; Purple Heart

Donald Jack Ruhl (July 2, 1923 – February 21, 1945) was a United States Marine and a posthumous recipient of the United States military's highest decoration, the Medal of Honor. Ruhl, a private first class, received the award for falling on a grenade to protect fellow Marines during the Battle of Iwo Jima.

== Early years ==
Ruhl was born in Columbus, Montana, on July 2, 1923. Educated in the grammar schools of Columbus, he graduated from high school in Joliet, Montana, in 1942.

From 1937 to about May 1942, the blue-eyed, brown-haired youth worked as a general farm hand on a 400-acre (1.6 km^{2}) farm in Joilet. His wages were $15 a week, room and board and, as the farm had no mechanical labor, he worked hard for his pay. In the spring of 1942, shortly before his graduation, he went to work for the Independent Refining Company of Laurel, Montana, as a laboratory assistant for $32 a week. His only relaxation was found in hunting small game with his 12-gauge shotgun.

== Marine Corps training ==
He enlisted in the Marine Corps Reserve on September 12, 1942, in Butte, Montana, and went on active duty the same day. He was transferred to the recruit depot in San Diego, California, and during his training fired a score of 224 with the service rifle to qualify as a sharpshooter. Ruhl also made the grade as a "combat swimmer". For sport the 5 ft 11 in, 147 lb farmer boxed in the recruit matches and also participated in baseball, basketball, and swimming.

Upon completion of boot camp in November, Ruhl was transferred to Company B, Parachute Training School, San Diego. Promoted to private first class on December 19, 1942, at the conclusion of the five-week course, the qualified parachutist joined Company C, 3rd Parachute Battalion of the 3rd Marine Division at Camp Elliott, San Diego.

Ruhl went overseas on board the USS Mount Vernon (AP-22) on March 12, 1943, as a 60-millimeter mortar crewman. En route to New Caledonia, which was to be a training base for the Parachute Marines, he crossed the equator on March 17, and was duly initiated into the realm of King Neptune.

After six months of training at New Caledonia, his unit sailed for Guadalcanal on board the USS American Legion (APA-17) in September 1943. In October, the unit which was now Company L, 3rd Parachute Battalion, 1st Marine Parachute Regiment, I Marine Amphibious Corps, boarded ship and moved on to the newly won Vella Lavella island in the Southern Solomons. About two and one half months later, Ruhl was again aboard ship. This time it was an LCI (Landing Craft Infantry), and the destination was Bougainville Island.

== World War II combat ==
The 3rd Parachute Battalion saw its first combat there at Bougainville and then in January returned to Guadalcanal from whence it sailed for the United States aboard the USAT David C. Shanks. Arriving in San Diego on February 14, 1944, Ruhl was transferred to Company E, 2nd Battalion, 28th Marines of the fledgling 5th Marine Division when the Parachute units were disbanded on February 21, 1944.

Ruhl left the United States once more on September 19, 1944, aboard the USAT Sea Corporal. It arrived at Hilo, Hawaii, five days later. He started on his last series of ship rides when he left Hilo on the USS Missoula (APA-211) in January 1945. After stops at Honolulu, Maui, and Eniwetok, he arrived at Saipan in February. There he changed over to the USS LST-481. LST-481 carried the Marines to the shores of Iwo Jima.

=== Medal of Honor action on Iwo Jima ===
D-Day at Iwo was February 19, 1945. On that day, Ruhl single-handedly attacked a group of eight Japanese who had been driven from a blockhouse. Killing one with his bayonet, he killed another with rifle fire before the rest fled. Early the next morning, he left the safety of his tank trap and moved out under a tremendous volume of mortar and machine gun fire to rescue a wounded Marine lying in an exposed position about forty yards forward of the front lines.

Half carrying and half pulling the wounded man, Ruhl removed him to a position out of reach of enemy rifles. Calling for an assistant and a stretcher, he again braved the heavy fire to carry the casualty 300 yards (270 m) back to an aid station on the beach. Returning to his outfit, he volunteered to investigate an apparently abandoned Japanese gun emplacement seventy-five yards forward of the right flank. Subsequently, he occupied the position through the night thus preventing the enemy from again taking possession of the valuable weapon.

The next morning, D-plus two, Company E, 2nd Battalion, 28th Marines pushed forward in the assault against the vast network of fortifications surrounding the base of Mount Suribachi. During the advance, Ruhl with his platoon guide Sergeant Henry Hansen, later famous for a mistaken belief that he was involved in raising an American flag on Mount Suribachi, crawled to the top of a Japanese bunker to bring fire to bear on enemy troops located on the far side of the bunker. Suddenly a hostile grenade landed between the two Marines. Calling a warning to Hansen, Ruhl instantly dove on the grenade and absorbed the full charge of the explosion with his body. His action not only saved Hansen but also prevented the grenade fragments from wounding other nearby Marines. Rather than using his position on the edge of the bunker to easily drop down into a more protected spot, he sacrificed his life to save his fellow Marines.

Two days later, Company E raised the American flag on the top of Mount Suribachi.

The Medal of Honor was posthumously awarded to Ruhl and presented to his parents on January 12, 1947, at Greybull, Wyoming, where they made their home. The ceremonies were conducted by the veterans' organization of Greybull.

Ruhl was initially buried in the 5th Marine Division Cemetery on Iwo Jima, but was later reinterred in Donald J. Ruhl Memorial Cemetery in Greybull, Wyoming.

== Medal of Honor citation ==
The President of the United States takes pride in presenting the MEDAL OF HONOR posthumously to

PRIVATE FIRST CLASS DONALD J. RUHL
UNITED STATES MARINE CORPS RESERVE

for service as set forth in the following CITATION:

For conspicuous gallantry and intrepidity at the risk of his life above and beyond the call of duty while serving as a Rifleman in an Assault Platoon of Company E, Twenty-eight Marines, Fifth Marine Division, in action against enemy Japanese Forces on Iwo Jima, Volcano Islands, from 19 to February 21, 1945. Quick to press the advantage after eight Japanese had been driven from a blockhouse on D-Day, Private First Class Ruhl singlehandedly attacked the group, killing one of the enemy with his bayonet and another by rifle fire in his determined attempt to annihilate the escaping troops. Cool and undaunted as the fury of hostile resistance steadily increased throughout the night, he voluntarily left the shelter of his tank trap early in the morning of D-Day plus 1 and moved out under tremendous volume of mortar and machine-gun fire to rescue a wounded Marine lying in an exposed position approximately forty yards forward of the line. Half pulling and half carrying the wounded man, he removed him to a defoliated position, called for an assistant and a stretcher and, again running the gauntlet of hostile fire, carried the casualty to an Aid Station some three hundred yards distant on the beach. Returning to his platoon, he continued his valiant efforts, volunteering to investigate an apparently abandoned Japanese gun emplacement seventy-five yards forward of the flank during consolidation of the front lines, and subsequently occupying the position through the night to prevent the enemy form repossessing the valuable weapon. Pushing forward in the assault against the vast network of fortifications surrounding Mt. Suribachi the following morning, he crawled with his platoon guide to the top of a Japanese bunker to bring fire to bear on enemy troops located on the far side of the bunker, suddenly a hostile grenade landed between the two Marines. Instantly Private First Class Ruhl called a warning to his fellow Marine and dived on the deadly missile, absorbing the full impact of the shattering explosion in his own body and protecting all within range from the danger of flying fragments although he might easily have dropped from his position on the edge of the bunker to the ground below. An indomitable fighter, Private First Class Ruhl rendered heroic service toward to defeat of a ruthless enemy, and his valor, initiative and unfaltering spirit of self-sacrifice in the face of almost certain death sustained and enhanced the highest traditions of the United States Naval Service. He gallantly gave his life for his country.

/S/ HARRY S. TRUMAN

== See also ==
- List of Medal of Honor recipients for World War II
- List of Medal of Honor recipients for the Battle of Iwo Jima
