= Joseph R. Julian =

United States Marine Corps Medal of Honor recipient (1918–1945)

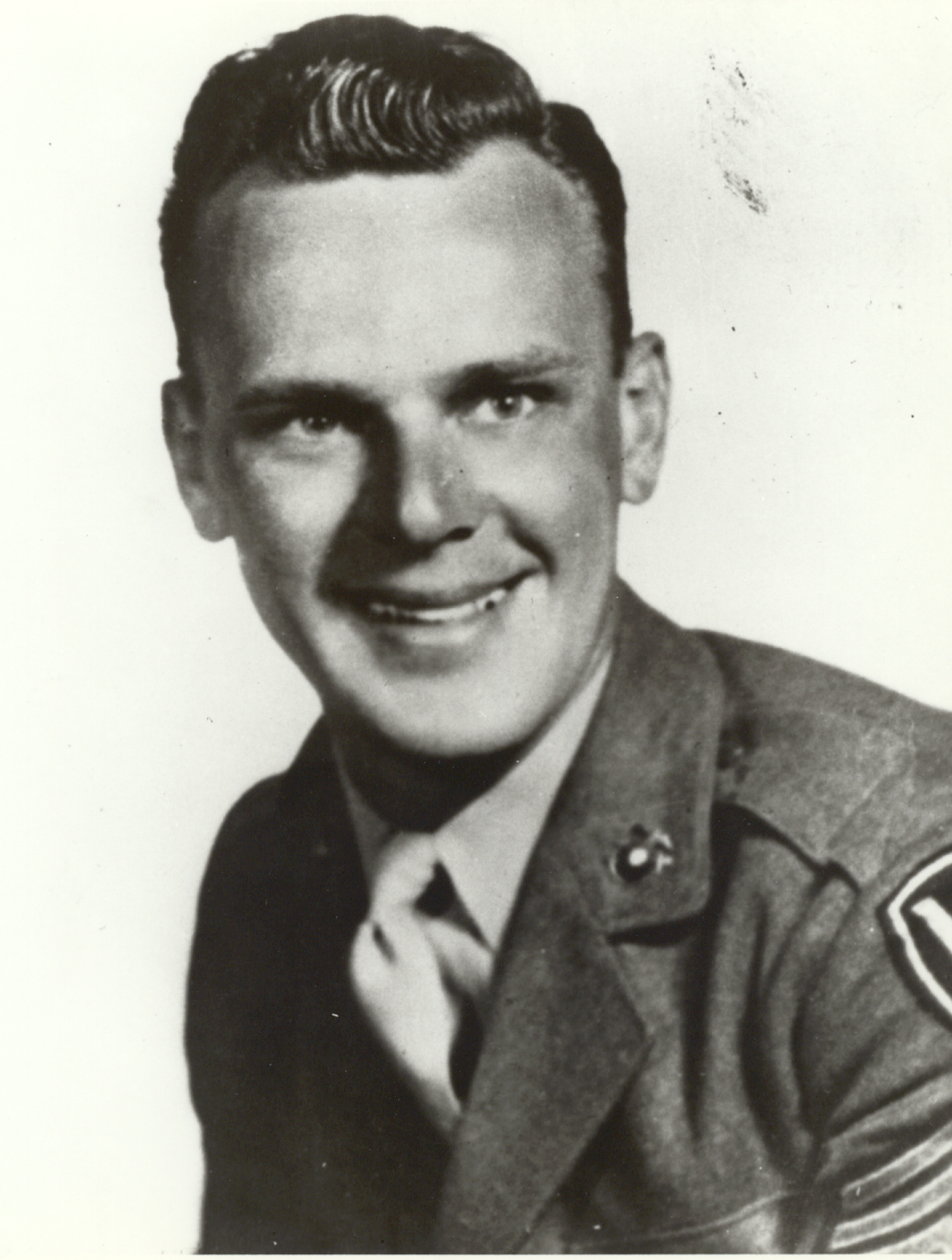
- Joseph R. Julian, Medal of Honor recipient
- Born: April 3, 1918; Sturbridge, Massachusetts
- Died: March 9, 1945 (aged 26); Iwo Jima, Volcano Islands, Japanese Empire
- Burial place: Long Island National Cemetery, Farmingdale, New York
- Military career
- Allegiance: United States of America
- Branch: United States Marine Corps
- Service years: 1942–1945
- Rank: Platoon Sergeant
- Units: 1st Battalion, 27th Marines
- Conflicts: World War II; Battle of Iwo Jima †
- Awards: Medal of Honor; Bronze Star Medal; Purple Heart

Platoon Sergeant Joseph Rudolph Julian (April 3, 1918 – March 9, 1945) was a United States Marine who was posthumously awarded the United States' highest military honor – the Medal of Honor – for his heroism and sacrifice of life in 1945 in the Battle of Iwo Jima during World War II.

== Biography ==
Joseph Rudolph (or Rodolph) Julian (sources differ) was born in Sturbridge, Massachusetts on April 3, 1918. He graduated from Southbridge High School, and in January 1942, he enlisted in the United States Marine Corps Reserve.

Following basic training at Parris Island, South Carolina, he became a Drill Instructor, and, later, was assigned to the 5th Marine Division. He was killed in action on Iwo Jima on March 9, 1945, following a one-man assault on enemy-occupied trenches and fortified positions. The Medal of Honor was awarded him posthumously for heroism above and beyond the call of duty.

The Medal and citation were presented to his parents by the Secretary of the Navy on November 15, 1945. Following the war, Sgt. Julian's remains were reinterred at Long Island National Cemetery, Farmingdale, New York, on January 8, 1949, at the request of his parents.

== Medal of Honor citation ==
Determined to force a breakthrough when Japanese troops occupying trenches and fortified positions on the left front laid down a terrific machine gun and mortar barrage in a desperate effort to halt his company's advance, P/Sgt. Julian quickly established his platoon's guns in strategic supporting positions, and then, acting on his own initiative, fearlessly moved forward to execute a 1-man assault on the nearest pillbox. Advancing alone, he hurled deadly demolition and white phosphorus grenades into the emplacement, killing 2 of the enemy and driving the remaining 5 out into the adjoining trench system. Seizing a discarded rifle, he jumped into the trench and dispatched the 5 before they could make an escape. Intent on wiping out all resistance, he obtained more explosives and, accompanied by another Marine, again charged the hostile fortifications and knocked out 2 more cave positions. Immediately thereafter, he launched a bazooka attack unassisted, firing 4 rounds into the 1 remaining pillbox and completely destroying it before he fell, mortally wounded by a vicious burst of enemy fire. Stouthearted and indomitable, P/Sgt. Julian consistently disregarded all personal danger and, by his bold decision, daring tactics, and relentless fighting spirit during a critical phase of the battle, contributed materially to the continued advance of his company and to the success of his division's operations in the sustained drive toward the conquest of this fiercely defended outpost of the Japanese Empire. His outstanding valor and unfaltering spirit of self-sacrifice throughout the bitter conflict sustained and enhanced the highest traditions of the U.S. Naval Service. He gallantly gave his life for his country.

== Awards and decorations ==

| 1st row | Medal of Honor | | Bronze Star Medal |
| 2nd row | Purple Heart | Combat Action Ribbon | Presidential Unit Citation |
| 3rd row | American Campaign Medal | Asiatic-Pacific Campaign Medal with one campaign star | World War II Victory Medal |

== See also ==
- List of Medal of Honor recipients
- List of Medal of Honor recipients for World War II
- List of Medal of Honor recipients for the Battle of Iwo Jima
