= List of Medal of Honor recipients for the Battle of Iwo Jima =

The Medal of Honor is the highest military decoration presented by the United States government to a member of its armed forces. The Battle of Iwo Jima took place in February and March 1945 during World War II and was marked by some of the fiercest fighting of the war. The American invasion, known as Operation Detachment, was charged with capturing the airfields on Iwo Jima.

The Imperial Japanese Army positions on the island were heavily fortified, with vast bunkers, hidden artillery, and 18 kilometers (11 mi) of tunnels. The battle was the first American attack on the Japanese Home Islands, and the Imperial soldiers defended their positions to the death; of the 21,000 Japanese soldiers present at the beginning of the battle, over 20,000 were killed and only 216 taken prisoner.

During the two-month-long battle, 27 U.S. military personnel were awarded the Medal of Honor for their actions. Of the 27 medals awarded, 22 were presented to Marines and five were presented to United States Navy sailors, four of whom were Hospital Corpsmen, a petty officer rank identified in the table by the WWII-era rating title Pharmacist's Mate. This represents over 25% of the 82 Medals of Honor awarded to Marines, and four of the seven Medals of Honor awarded to Hospital Corpsmen, in the entirety of World War II. The 27 recipients held a wide range of ranks, from private to lieutenant colonel. Fourteen (52%) received their awards posthumously.

== Recipients ==
This with the * indicates that the Medal of Honor was awarded posthumously

Image	Name	Service	Rank	Date of action	Unit	Notes
black and white headshot of Charles Berry in his military uniform	Charles J. Berry*	Marine Corps	Corporal	March 3, 1945	1st Battalion, 26th Marine Regiment, 5th Marine Division	The Erie Avenue Bridge in Lorain, Ohio was renamed in 1988 to the Charles Berry Bridge in honor of Cpl Berry, a native son of the city. Sacrificed himself to smother a grenade
black and white headshot of William Caddy in his military uniform	William R. Caddy*	Marine Corps Reserve	Private First Class	March 3, 1945	Company I, 3rd Battalion, 26th Marine Regiment, 5th Marine Division	Sacrificed his life to save the lives of his platoon leader and platoon sergeant
black and white headshot of Justice Chambers in his military uniform	Justice M. Chambers	Marine Corps Reserve	Lieutenant Colonel	February 19–22, 1945	3d Assault Battalion Landing Team, 25th Marine Regiment, 4th Marine Division	Led the 8-hour battle to carry the flanking ridge top and reduce the enemy's fields of aimed fire, thus protecting the vital foothold gained
black and white headshot of Darrell Cole in his military uniform	Darrell S. Cole*	Marine Corps Reserve	Sergeant	February 19, 1945	Company B, 1st Battalion, 23rd Marine Regiment, 4th Marine Division	Namesake of USS Cole (DDG-67)
black and white headshot of Robert Dunlap in his military uniform	Robert H. Dunlap	Marine Corps Reserve	Captain	February 20–21, 1945	Company C, 1st Battalion, 26th Marine Regiment, 5th Marine Division	Risked his life to gather intelligence about and direct fire on, enemy gun positions
black and white headshot of Ross Gray in his military uniform	Ross F. Gray*	Marine Corps Reserve	Sergeant	February 21, 1945	Company A, 1st Battalion, 25th Marine Regiment, 4th Marine Division	Single-handedly overcame a strong enemy garrison and completely disarmed a large mine field before finally rejoining his unit.
black and white headshot of William Harrell in his military uniform	William G. Harrell	Marine Corps	Sergeant	March 3, 1945	Company A, 1st Battalion, 28th Marine Regiment, 5th Marine Division	Risked his life to defend his position against a larger enemy force
black and white headshot of Rufus Herring in his military uniform	Rufus G. Herring	USNR	Lieutenant, Junior Grade	February 17, 1945	USS LCI(G)-449	Maintained position in the firing line with his 20-mm guns in action in the face of sustained enemy fire and conned his crippled ship to safety
black and white headshot of Douglas Jacobson in his military uniform	Douglas T. Jacobson	Marine Corps Reserve	Private First Class	February 26, 1945	3rd Battalion, 23rd Marine Regiment, 4th Marine Division	Risked his life by destroying a total of sixteen enemy positions and approximately seventy-five Japanese
black and white headshot of Joseph Julian in his military uniform	Joseph R. Julian*	Marine Corps Reserve	Platoon Sergeant	March 9, 1945	1st Battalion, 27th Marine Regiment, 5th Marine Division	Sacrificed his life to eliminate an enemy threat
black and white headshot of James La Belle in his military uniform	James D. La Belle*	Marine Corps Reserve	Private First Class	March 8, 1945	Weapons Company, 27th Marine Regiment, 5th Marine Division	Sacrificed his life to save a group of his fellow Marines by diving on a grenade
black and white headshot of John Leims in his military uniform	John H. Leims	Marine Corps Reserve	Second Lieutenant	March 7, 1945	Company B, 1st Battalion, 9th Marine Regiment, 3rd Marine Division	Risked his life to rescue several wounded Marines
black and white headshot of Jacklyn Lucas in his military uniform	Jacklyn Harrell Lucas	Marine Corps Reserve	Private First Class	February 20, 1945	1st Battalion, 26th Marine Regiment, 5th Marine Division	Covered two Japanese grenades with his body. Survived the blast of the one that exploded. Youngest recipient since the Civil War (turned 17 just 5 days before Iwo Jima D-Day)
black and white headshot of Jack Lummus in his military uniform	Jack Lummus*	Marine Corps Reserve	First Lieutenant	March 8, 1945	2nd Battalion, 27th Marine Regiment, 5th Marine Division	Had earlier played football for the New York Giants. Spearheaded an assault with his platoon despite being wounded by two grenades.
black and white headshot of Harry Martin in his military uniform	Harry L. Martin*	Marine Corps Reserve	First Lieutenant	March 26, 1945	Company C, 5th Pioneer Battalion, 5th Marine Division	Sacrificed his life to help rescue some of his men who had been overrun by the enemy.
black and white headshot of Joseph McCarthy in his military uniform	Joseph J. McCarthy	Marine Corps Reserve	Captain	February 21, 1945	2nd Battalion, 24th Marine Regiment, 4th Marine Division	Risked his life to eliminate several enemy troops so his men could move forward
black and white headshot of George Phillips in his military uniform	George Phillips*	Marine Corps Reserve	Private	March 14, 1945	2nd Battalion, 28th Marine Regiment, 5th Marine Division	Sacrificed his life to save the lives of fellow Marines
black and white headshot of Francis Pierce in his military uniform	Francis J. Pierce	Navy	Pharmacist's Mate First Class	March 15–16, 1945	2nd Battalion, 24th Marine Regiment, 4th Marine Division	Risked his life to save several wounded servicemembers and volunteered for a mission to eliminate an enemy threat
black and white headshot of Donald Ruhl in his military uniform	Donald J. Ruhl*	Marine Corps Reserve	Private First Class	February 19–21, 1945	Company E, 2nd Battalion, 28th Marine Regiment, 5th Marine Division	Saved several of his fellow Marines by sacrificing his life and diving on an enemy grenade
black and white headshot of Franklin Sigler in his military uniform	Franklin E. Sigler	Marine Corps Reserve	Private	March 14, 1945	Company F 2nd Battalion, 26th Marine Regiment, 5th Marine Division	Led a charge against an enemy gun installation which had held up the advance of his company for several days
black and white headshot of Tony stein in his military uniform	Tony Stein*	Marine Corps Reserve	Corporal	February 19, 1945	Company A, 1st Battalion, 28th Marine Regiment, 5th Marine Division	First Medal of Honor of Iwo Jima. Armed with a personally improvised man-portable aircraft machine gun, charged Japanese pillboxes single-handedly, ran back to replenish ammo eight times under fire and covered the withdrawal of his platoon.
black and white headshot of George Wahlen in his military uniform	George E. Wahlen	Navy	Pharmacist's Mate Second Class	March 3, 1945	2nd Battalion, 26th Marine Regiment, 5th Marine Division	Although seriously wounded he risked his life to save the lives of several other servicemembers
black and white headshot of William Walsh in his military uniform	William G. Walsh*	Marine Corps Reserve	Gunnery Sergeant	February 27, 1945	Company G, 3rd Battalion, 27th Marine Regiment, 5th Marine Division	Sacrificed his life to save a group of fellow Marines
Man in Marine Corps uniform with Medal of Honor	Wilson D. Watson	Marine Corps Reserve	Private	February 26–27, 1945	2nd Battalion, 9th Marine Regiment, 3rd Marine Division	Risked his life fighting the enemy single-handedly for 15 minutes until his platoon could catch up to him
black and white headshot of Hershel Williams in his military uniform	Hershel W. Williams	Marine Corps Reserve	Corporal	February 23, 1945	1st Battalion, 21st Marine Regiment, 3rd Marine Division	Risked his life attacking the enemy for 4 hours with an M2-2 Portable Flamethrower to minimize unit casualties. The last living Medal of Honor recipient from World War II
black and white headshot of Jack Williams in his military uniform	Jack Williams*	USNR	Pharmacist's Mate Third Class	March 3, 1945	3rd Battalion, 28th Marine Regiment, 5th Marine Division	Killed while performing first aid to a wounded Marine
black and white headshot of John Willis in his military uniform	John H. Willis*	Navy	Pharmacist's Mate First Class	February 28, 1945	3rd Battalion, 27th Marine Regiment, 5th Marine Division	Killed by a grenade while assisting a wounded Marine

== See also ==
- John Basilone, Medal of Honor recipient (Guadalcanal) killed on Iwo Jima and posthumously awarded the Navy Cross
- Raising the flag on Iwo Jima
- The Unknown American Soldier from World War II
