= John H. Leims =

US Marine Corps officer and Medal of Honor recipient (1921–1985)

John Harold Leims
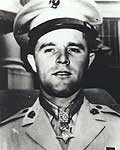
- Medal of Honor recipient
- Born: June 8, 1921; Chicago, Illinois, US
- Died: June 28, 1985 (aged 64)
- Burial place: Arlington National Cemetery
- Military career
- Allegiance: United States of America
- Branch: United States Marine Corps
- Service years: 1942–1962
- Rank: Captain
- Units: 1st Battalion, 9th Marines
- Commands: B Company, 1st Battalion, 9th Marine Regiment, 3rd Marine Division
- Conflicts: World War II: Battle of Iwo Jima
- Awards: Medal of Honor; Purple Heart

Captain John Harold Leims (June 8, 1921 – June 28, 1985) was a Marine who was awarded the Medal of Honor as a second lieutenant on Iwo Jima for his heroic actions on March 7, 1945.

== Early years ==
John Harold Leims was born in Chicago, Illinois, on June 8, 1921. He attended St. Hilary Parochial School, Archbishop Quigley Preparatory Seminary, and graduated from Saint George High School in Evanston, Illinois, in 1939. At Saint George's, he played varsity football and track, was sports editor of the school paper, and was an Assistant Scoutmaster in the Boy Scouts of America.

After high school, he attended Northwestern University for two and a half years, and worked part-time at the Commonwealth Edison Company. He left college in 1941 following his marriage, and worked subsequently for the Standard Oil Company; the Paschen Construction Company; the Naval Station at Great Lakes, Illinois, and the Austin Construction Company.

== Marine Corps service ==
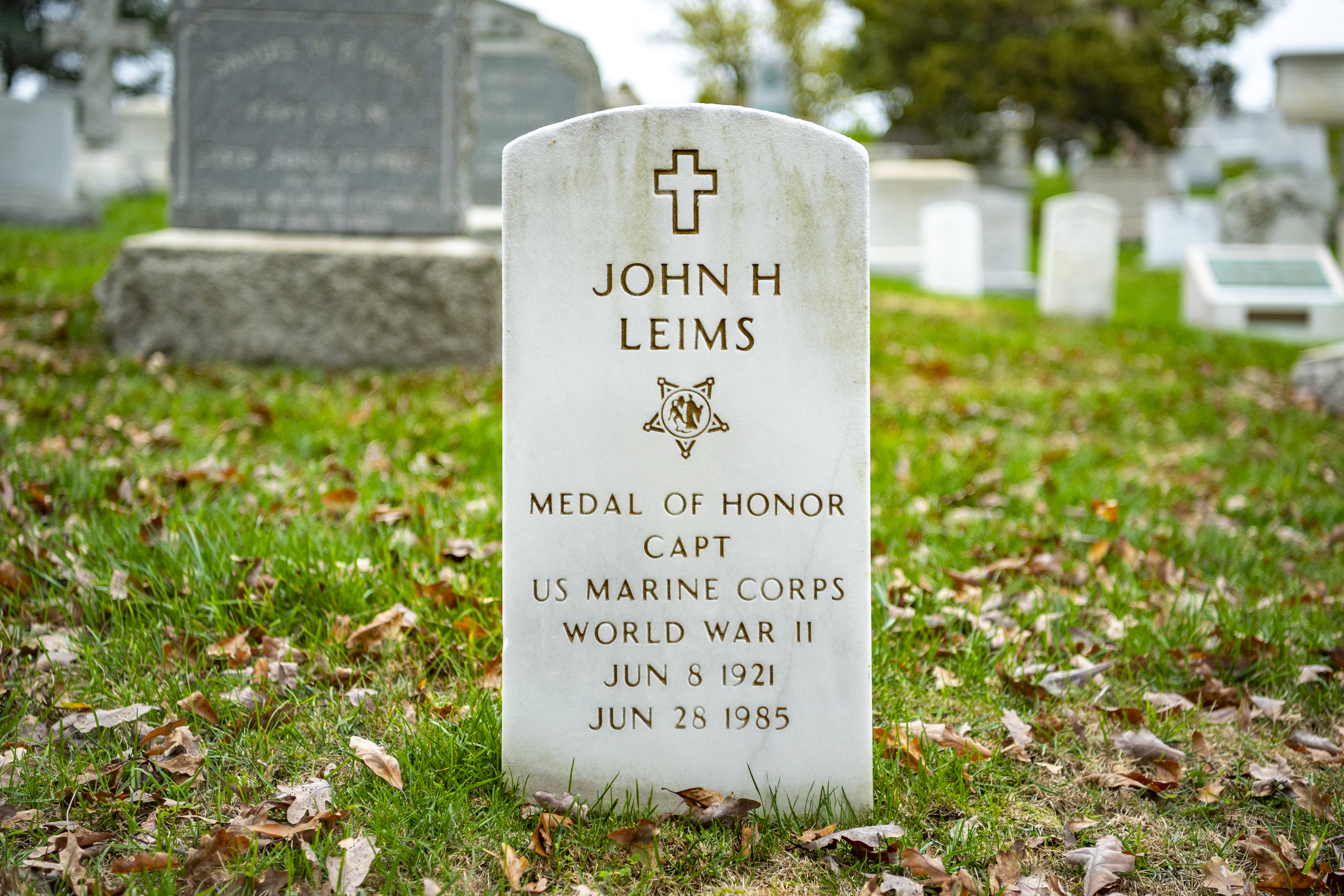
Grave at Arlington National Cemetery

Enlisting in the Marine Corps Reserve on November 27, 1942, he completed recruit training at Marine Corps Recruit Depot San Diego and was assigned to the 3rd Service Battalion, 3rd Marine Division. He left for overseas duty with that unit, on February 23, 1943. After four months in New Zealand and two months at Guadalcanal, he was selected for officer training and returned to the United States in September 1943. He was commissioned a Marine second lieutenant on March 1, 1944, at Quantico, Virginia.

On June 29, 1944, 2nd Lt Leims went overseas again and rejoined the 3rd Marine Division. This time, he was a company officer in a rifle company of the 1st Battalion, 9th Marines. In October and November, he was actively engaged in patrolling against Japanese holdouts on Guam.

Landing on Iwo Jima on February 24, 1945, he was slightly wounded by a shell fragment on February 27, but returned to duty on the same day. On March 3, due to heavy casualties, he became company commander (B-1-9), a position usually filled by a captain. On March 7, he led his company in a surprise attack against a strongly fortified enemy hill position, succeeded in capturing the objective, and in spite of withering fire returned forward to rescue two of his wounded men.

Promoted to first lieutenant on June 1, 1945, he returned to the United States that November and was detached from active duty on January 25, 1946. On June 14 of that year, he was temporarily recalled to active duty to receive the Medal of Honor, presented to him by President Harry S. Truman in a White House ceremony.

A member of the 9th Reserve District, Leims was subsequently promoted to captain in the Marine Corps Reserve in 1956, and retired on July 1, 1962. He died on June 28, 1985, at the age of 64.

He was buried at Arlington National Cemetery, Arlington, Virginia.

== Medal of Honor citation ==
The President of the United States takes pleasure in presenting the MEDAL OF HONOR to

SECOND LIEUTENANT JOHN H. LEIMS
UNITED STATES MARINE CORPS RESERVE

for service as set forth in the following CITATION:

For conspicuous gallantry and intrepidity at the risk of his life above and beyond the call of duty as Commanding Officer of Company B, First Battalion, Ninth Marines, Third Marine Division, in action against enemy Japanese forces on Iwo Jima in the Volcano Islands, on 7 March 1945. Launching a surprise attack against the rock-embedded fortifications of a dominating Japanese hill position, Second Lieutenant Leims spurred his company forward with indomitable determination and, skillfully directing his assault platoons against the cave-emplaced enemy troops and heavily fortified pillboxes, succeeded in capturing the objective in the late afternoon. When it became apparent that his assault platoons were cut off in this newly won position, approximately four hundred yards forward of adjacent units and lacked all communication with the command post, he personally advanced and laid telephone lines across the isolating expanse of open, fire-swept terrain. Ordered to withdraw his command after he had joined his forward platoons, he immediately complied, adroitly effecting the withdrawal of his troops without incident. Upon arriving at the rear, he was informed that several casualties had been left at the abandoned ridge position beyond the front lines. Although suffering acutely from strain and exhaustion of battle, he instantly went forward despite darkness and the slashing fury of hostile machine-gun fire, located and carried to safety one seriously wounded Marine and then, running the gauntlet of enemy fire for the third time that night, again made his tortuous way into the bullet-riddled deathtrap and rescued another of his wounded men. A dauntless leader, concerned at all times for the welfare of his men, Second Lieutenant Leims soundly maintained the coordinated strength of his battle-wearied company under extremely difficult conditions and, by his bold tactics, sustained aggressiveness and heroic disregard of all personal danger, contributed essentially to the success of his division's operations against this vital Japanese base. His valiant conduct in the face of fanatic opposition sustained and enhanced the highest traditions of the United States Marine Corps.

/S/ HARRY S. TRUMAN

== Awards and decorations ==

1st row	Medal of Honor		
2nd row	Purple Heart	Combat Action Ribbon	Presidential Unit Citation
3rd row	American Campaign Medal	Asiatic-Pacific Campaign Medal with two campaign stars	World War II Victory Medal
4th row	National Defense Service Medal with one service star	Armed Forces Reserve Medal	Selected Marine Corps Reserve Medal

== See also ==
- List of Medal of Honor recipients
- List of Medal of Honor recipients for World War II
- List of Medal of Honor recipients for the Battle of Iwo Jima
