= William G. Walsh =

United States Marine Corps Medal of Honor recipient (1922–1945)

William Gary Walsh
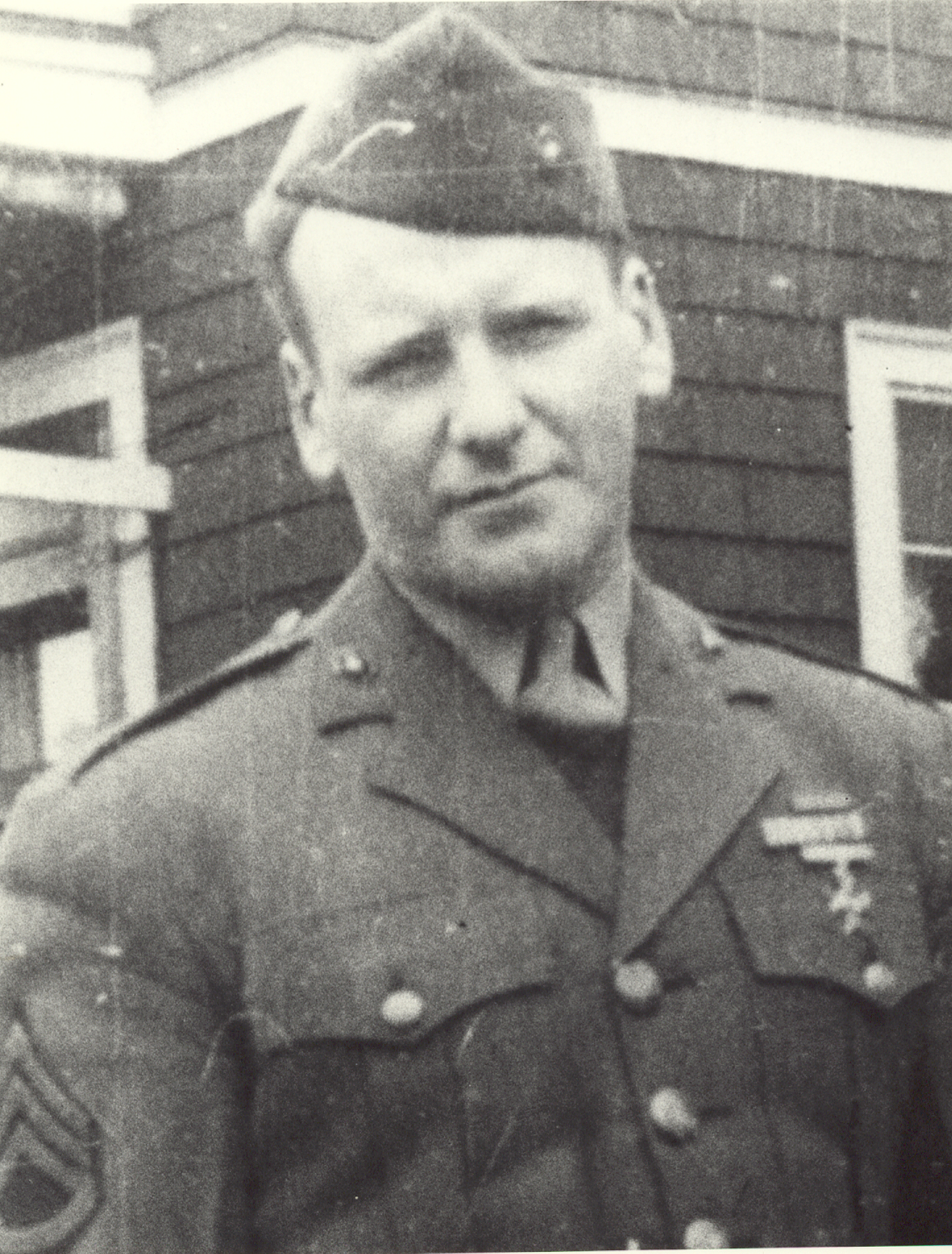
- William G. Walsh, Medal of Honor recipient
- Born: April 7, 1922; Roxbury, Massachusetts, U.S.
- Died: February 27, 1945 (aged 22); Iwo Jima, Volcano Islands, Japanese Empire
- Burial place: Arlington National Cemetery
- Military career
- Allegiance: United States of America
- Branch: United States Marine Corps
- Service years: 1942–1945
- Rank: Gunnery Sergeant
- Units: 2nd Raider Battalion; 27th Marine Regiment, 5th Marine Division
- Conflicts: World War II; Guadalcanal campaign; Bougainville campaign; Battle of Tarawa; Battle of Iwo Jima †
- Awards: Medal of Honor; Purple Heart

Gunnery Sergeant William Gary Walsh (April 7, 1922 – February 27, 1945) was a United States Marine who heroically sacrificed his life to save the lives of his fellow Marines during the Battle of Iwo Jima during World War II. For his actions on February 27, 1945, he posthumously received the Medal of Honor.

== Biography ==
William Walsh was born on April 7, 1922, in Roxbury, Massachusetts. He attended public schools in Boston before enlisting in the United States Marine Corps in April 1942. He went to boot camp at the Marine Corps Recruit Depot Parris Island, South Carolina, and advanced training at Camp Lejeune, North Carolina.

From Camp Lejeune, he went to Samoa and was assigned to a unit of Marine scouts. His next assignment was with the 2nd Marine Raider battalion, the famed Carlson's Raiders. During the United States' war with Japan in the Pacific, he saw action at Guadalcanal, Bougainville, Tarawa, and in the Russell Islands.

Following two years of service in the Pacific theatre, he returned to the United States. He returned overseas later with the 5th Marine Division in time for the Iwo Jima invasion.

It was at Iwo Jima, while leading his men against a fortified hill on February 27, 1945, he threw himself on a hand grenade, sacrificing his life to save the lives of fellow Marines. For this heroic act, he was posthumously awarded the Medal of Honor.

Initially buried in the 5th Marine Division Cemetery on Iwo Jima, GySgt Walsh's remains were later reinterred in Arlington National Cemetery on April 20, 1948.

== Medal of Honor citation ==
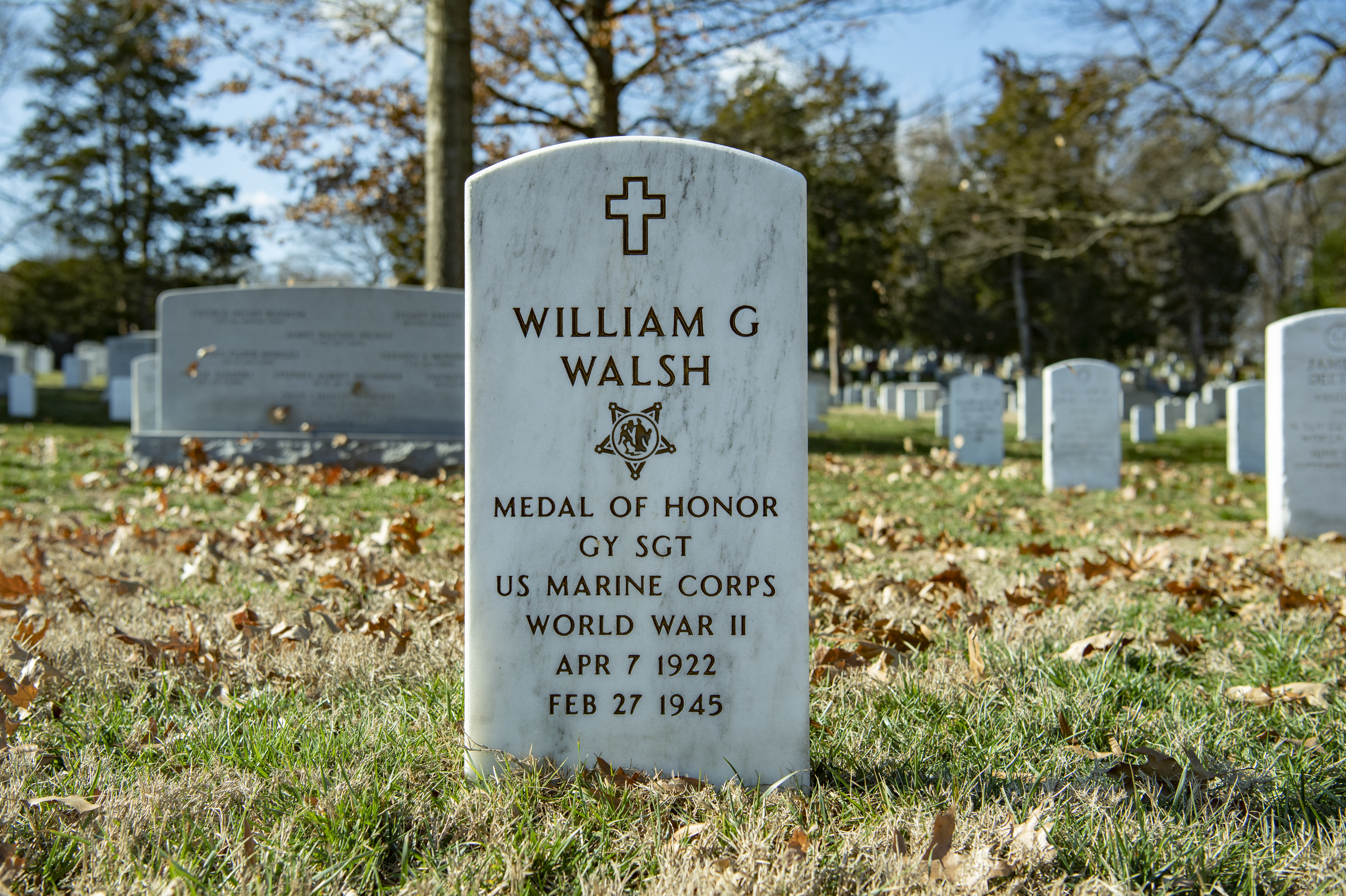
Grave at Arlington National Cemetery

The President of the United States takes pride in presenting the MEDAL OF HONOR posthumously to

GUNNERY SERGEANT WILLIAM G. WALSH
UNITED STATES MARINE CORPS RESERVE

for service as set forth in the following CITATION:

For conspicuous gallantry and intrepidity at the risk of his life above and beyond the call of duty as Leader of an Assault Platoon, serving with Company G, Third Battalion, Twenty-seventh Marines, Fifth Marine Division, in action against enemy Japanese forces at Iwo Jima, Volcano Islands, on 27 February 1945. With the advance of his company toward Hill 362 disrupted by vicious machine-gun fire from a forward position which guarded the approaches to this key enemy stronghold, Gunnery Sergeant Walsh fearlessly charged at the head of his platoon against the Japanese entrenched on the ridge above him, utterly oblivious to the unrelenting fury of hostile automatic weapons and hand grenades employed with fanatic desperation to smash his daring assault. Thrown back by the enemy's savage resistance, he once again led his men in a seemingly impossible attack up the steep, rocky slope, boldly defiant of the annihilating streams of bullets which saturated the area, and despite his own casualty losses and the overwhelming advantage held by the Japanese in superior numbers and dominate position, gained the ridge's top only to be subjected to an intense barrage of hand grenades thrown by the remaining Japanese staging a suicidal last stand on the reverse slope. When one of the grenades fell in the midst of his surviving men, huddled together in a small trench, Gunnery Sergeant Walsh in a final valiant act of complete self-sacrifice, instantly threw himself upon the deadly bomb, absorbing with his own body the full and terrific force of the explosion. Through his extraordinary initiative and inspiring valor in the face of almost certain death, he saved his comrades from injury and possible loss of life and enabled his company to seize and hold this vital enemy position. He gallantly gave his life for his country.

/S/ HARRY S. TRUMAN

== See also ==
- List of Medal of Honor recipients
- List of Medal of Honor recipients for World War II
- List of Medal of Honor recipients for the Battle of Iwo Jima
