= George Philips =

George Philips may refer to:

- Sir George Philips, 1st Baronet (1766–1847), English Member of Parliament
- Sir George Philips, 2nd Baronet (1789–1874), son of the 1st Baronet, English Member of Parliament
- George Philips (cricketer) (1831–1886), English first-class cricketer
- George Phillips (USMC) (1926–1945), United States Marine and Medal of Honor recipient

== See also ==
- George Phillips (disambiguation)
- George Philip (disambiguation)
