= Franklin E. Sigler =

United States Marine and Medal of Honor recipient (1924–1995)

Franklin Earl Sigler
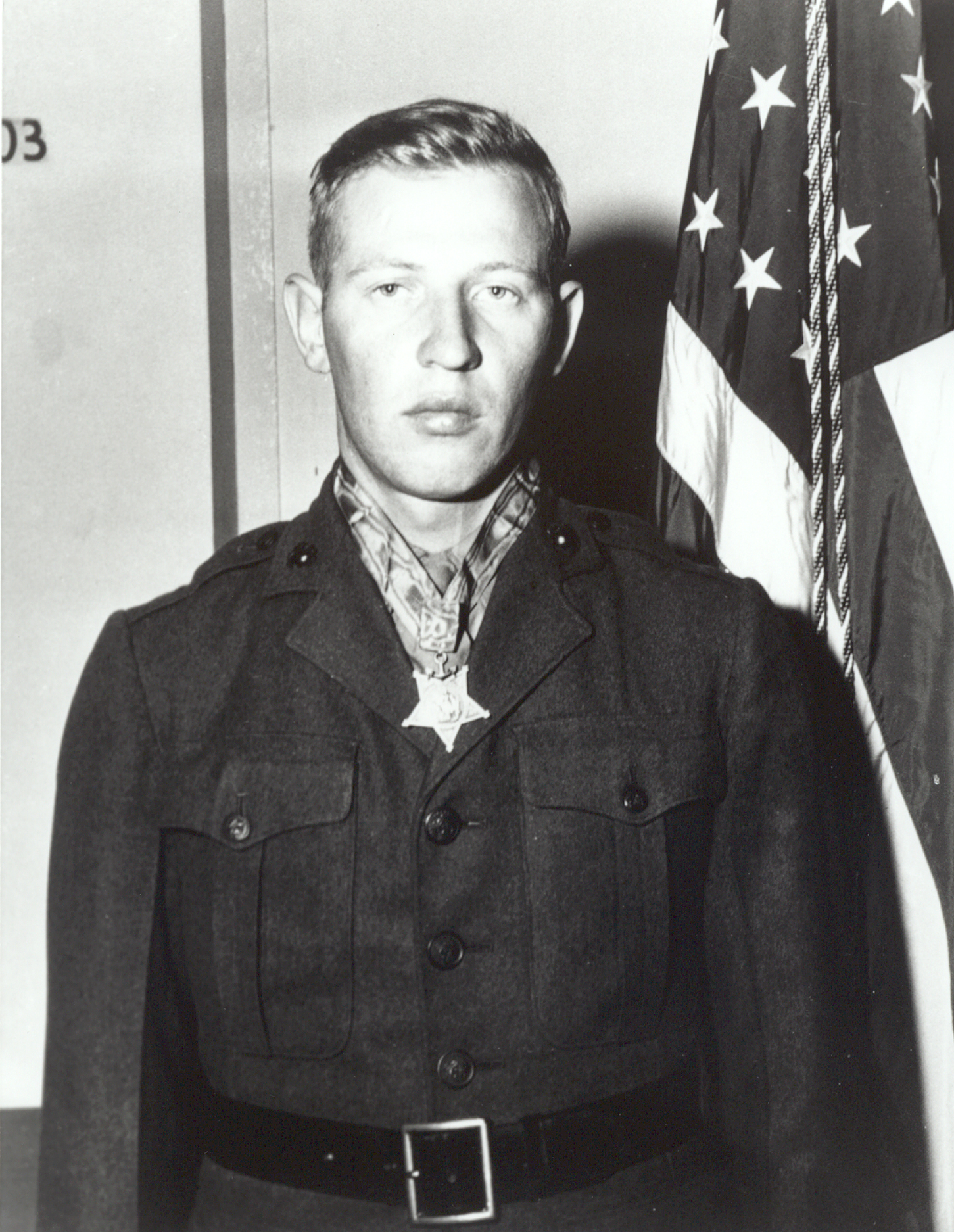
- Franklin E. Sigler, Medal of Honor recipient (unknown date)
- Born: November 6, 1924; Montclair or Glen Ridge, New Jersey, United States (Note: Sources differ regarding his actual birth location. The ArlingtonCemetery.net website cites Sigler's birth town both as Montclair and Glen Ridge, New Jersey, but the Marine Corps Who's Who citation reflects it as Glen Ridge. Since the two towns are adjacent to one another and because ArlingtonCemetery.net is a self-published website, the location reflected in the Marine Corps Who's who site was used.)
- Died: January 20, 1995 (aged 70); Newton, New Jersey, US
- Burial place: section 12, lot 2799; Arlington National Cemetery; Arlington, Virginia, United States
- Military career
- Allegiance: United States of America
- Branch: United States Marine Corps
- Service years: 1943–1946
- Rank: Private first class
- Units: 2nd Battalion, 26th Marine Regiment, 5th Marine Division
- Conflicts: World War II; Battle of Iwo Jima
- Awards: Medal of Honor; Purple Heart

Private First Class Franklin Earl Sigler (November 6, 1924 – January 20, 1995) was an American Marine who received the Medal of Honor for his actions in the Iwo Jima campaign – a one-man assault on a Japanese gun position which had been holding up the advance of his company for several days, and for annihilating the enemy gun crew with hand grenades. Although painfully wounded during his attack, he directed the fire of his squad and personally carried three of his buddies who were wounded to safety behind the lines.

The nation's highest military decoration was presented to PFC Sigler during ceremonies at the White House. U.S. President Harry S. Truman awarded the medal to him on October 5, 1945.

== Early life and education ==
Sigler was born November 6, 1924, in Glen Ridge, New Jersey. His parents, George & Elsie Sigler, his brothers named, Douglas in 1917, George in 1919, William in 1921 and Melvin K. in 1925 and a sister Mildred in 1930. All of Frank"s brothers served in the military and sometime between Franklin's birth and April 2, 1930, the family moved to Little Falls, New Jersey where he attended Little Falls High School prior to his enlistment in the United States Marine Corps.

== Military career ==
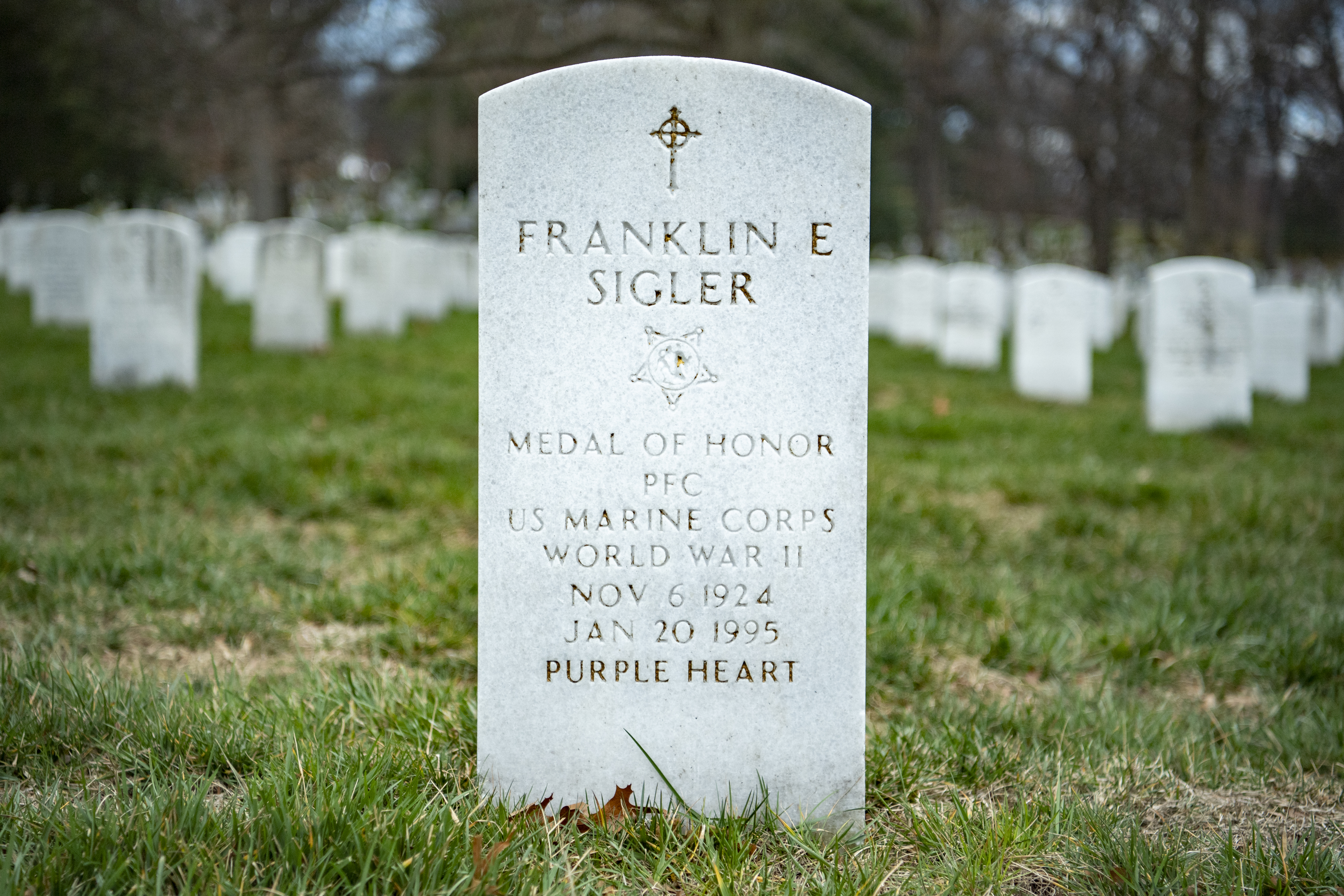
Grave at Arlington National Cemetery

On March 23, 1943, he joined the Marines and was sent to recruit training at Parris Island, South Carolina. Upon graduating was sent to the Guard Company, Marine Barracks, Navy Yard in Charleston, South Carolina, in June 1943. In April 1944, he joined Company F, 2nd Battalion, 26th Marine Regiment, 5th Marine Division, and in July, embarked aboard the USS Clay for Hilo, Hawaii. Sigler and his unit were only in Hawaii for a short time before they were sent to the south Pacific to participate in the Battle of Iwo Jima.

The unit saw heavy combat on the Japanese island of Iwo Jima in the Volcano Islands and Sigler's squad leaders were injured in the fighting. He took command of his squad and lead them against a Japanese gun position that had been holding up the advance of his company for several days. He was the first to reach the gun position and personally annihilated the gun crew with grenades. When the Japanese began firing from tunnels and caves leading to the gun position, he scaled the rocks leading up to the position and single-handedly assaulted them, completely surprising them. Although wounded, he refused to be evacuated and, crawling back to his squad, directed machine-gun and rocket fire on the cave entrances. In the ensuing fight three of his men were wounded and Sigler, disregarding the pain from his wound and the heavy enemy fire, carried them to safety behind the lines. Returning to his squad he remained with his men directing their fire until ordered to retire and seek medical aid. For his actions during this battle he received the Medal of Honor, the U.S. military's highest decoration for bravery in action. The medal was presented to him by President Truman at a White House ceremony October 5, 1945.

=== Post-war and military discharge ===
After his return to the U.S., he was hospitalized at the U.S. Naval Hospital in Bethesda, Maryland. Because of disabilities from the wounds he received in the battle he was discharged from the Marine Corps at the rank of private first class in June 1946.

== Death ==
He died January 20, 1995, at age 70, and was buried at Arlington National Cemetery. He is buried a few yards from his brother, PFC William C. Sigler (1921–1943) who was killed in a traffic accident while on leave in Wellington, New Zealand.

== Medal of Honor citation ==
"The President of the United States takes pleasure in presenting the MEDAL OF HONOR to

PRIVATE FRANKLIN E. SIGLER
UNITED STATES MARINE CORPS RESERVE

for service as set forth in the following CITATION:

For conspicuous gallantry and intrepidity at the risk of his life above and beyond the call of duty while serving with the Second Battalion, Twenty-sixth Marines, Fifth Marine Division, in action against enemy Japanese forces during the seizure of Iwo Jima in the Volcano Islands on 14 March 1945. Voluntarily taking command of his rifle squad when the leader became a casualty, Private Sigler fearlessly led a bold charge against an enemy gun installation which had held up the advance of his company for several days and, reaching the position in advance of the others, assailed the emplacement with hand grenades and personally annihilated the entire crew. As additional Japanese troops opened fire from concealed tunnels and caves above, he quickly scaled the rocks leading to the attacking guns, surprised the enemy with a furious one-man assault and, although severely wounded in the encounter, deliberately crawled back to his squad position where he steadfastly refused evacuation, persistently directing heavy machine-gun and rocket barrages on the Japanese cave entrances. Undaunted by the merciless rain of hostile fire during the intensified action, he gallantly disregarded his own painful wounds to aid casualties, carrying three wounded squad members to safety behind the lines and returning to continue the battle with renewed determination until ordered to retire for medical treatment. Stouthearted and indomitable in the face of extreme peril, Private Sigler, by his alert initiative, unfaltering leadership and daring tactics in a critical situation, effected the release of his besieged company from enemy fire and contributed essentially to its further advance against a savagely fighting enemy. His superb valor, resolute fortitude and heroic spirit of self-sacrifice throughout reflect the highest credit upon Private Sigler and the United States Naval Service."

== See also ==
- List of Medal of Honor recipients for World War II
- List of Medal of Honor recipients for the Battle of Iwo Jima
