= Charles J. Berry =

United States Marine Corps Medal of Honor recipient (1923–1945)

Charles Joseph Berry
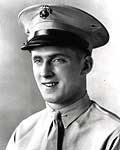
- Charles J. Berry, Medal of Honor recipient
- Born: July 10, 1923; Lorain, Ohio
- Died: March 3, 1945 (aged 21); Iwo Jima, Volcano Islands, Japanese Empire
- Burial place: Initially the 5th Marine Division Cemetery on Iwo Jima, later reinterred in Elmwood Cemetery, Lorain, Ohio
- Military career
- Allegiance: United States of America
- Branch: United States Marine Corps
- Service years: 1941–1945
- Rank: Corporal
- Units: 1st Parachute Battalion; 1st Battalion 26th Marines
- Conflicts: World War II; Pacific War; Solomon Islands campaign; Bougainville campaign; Battle of Empress Augusta Bay; Japan campaign; Volcano and Ryukyu Islands campaign; Battle of Iwo Jima †
- Awards: Medal of Honor; Purple Heart

Charles Joseph Berry (July 10, 1923 – March 3, 1945) was a Corporal in the Marine Corps who posthumously received the Medal of Honor for his actions during World War II.

After graduating high school Berry enlisted in the Marine Corps and upon graduating recruit training in South Carolina was stationed in Quantico Virginia and then North Carolina before being sent with 1st Parachute Battalion to fight in the Solomon Islands. After leaving North Carolina he went on to fight at Bougainville and then went to Guadalcanal for a short time before being sent to San Diego, California. While stationed at Camp Elliott in San Diego he was attached to the 5th Marine Division before being sent to the Hawaiian Islands and receiving the rank of corporal.

He landed on Iwo Jima on D-Day, February 19, 1945, and was killed in action on March 3, 1945, during the action which earned him the Medal of Honor. Initially buried in the 5th Marine Division Cemetery on Iwo Jima, he was re-interred in Elmwood Cemetery, Lorain, Ohio, in 1948.

== Biography ==
Charles Joseph Berry was born in Lorain, Ohio, on July 10, 1923 and graduated from Clearview High School (Lorain, Ohio) in 1941. After graduation he went to work as a truck driver for a moving concern.

He enlisted in the Marine Corps in Cleveland, Ohio, on October 1, 1941 when he was 18 years of age and was ordered to Parris Island, South Carolina, where he received his recruit training. Following the completion of recruit training, he was transferred for duty to the Marine Barracks, Quantico, Virginia, but shortly afterwards was ordered to the Marine Barracks, New River, North Carolina, where he entered parachute training. After qualifying as a paramarine, he was promoted to private first class on June 2, 1942.

He sailed from San Diego, California, on March 11, 1943, and arrived in New Caledonia later that month with the 1st Parachute Battalion, he left New Caledonia in September 1943. He arrived in the Solomon Islands a few weeks after his departure, and in October 1943, went to Vella La Vella, where he remained for one month. In November 1943, he landed at Bougainville, and during that campaign, took part in the raid at Koairi Beach and in the Empress Augusta Bay action. Prior to returning to the United States in February 1944, he spent a short time at Guadalcanal. Following his arrival at Camp Elliott, San Diego, he joined the newly organized 5th Marine Division in early 1944. In July he departed for the Hawaiian Islands with that division. He was advanced to corporal on July 22, 1944.

He landed on Iwo Jima on D-Day, February 19, 1945, and was killed in action on March 3, 1945, during the action which earned him the Medal of Honor. Initially buried in the 5th Marine Division Cemetery on Iwo Jima, he was reinterred in Elmwood Cemetery, Lorain, Ohio, in 1948.

== Awards and decorations ==
In addition to posthumously receiving the Medal of Honor, Cpl Berry was also awarded several other military decorations.

	Medal of Honor	
Purple Heart	Presidential Unit Citation	American Defense Service Medal
American Campaign Medal	Asiatic-Pacific Campaign Medal with two bronze stars	World War II Victory Medal

=== Medal of Honor citation ===
The President of the United States takes pride in presenting the MEDAL OF HONOR posthumously to

CORPORAL CHARLES J. BERRY
UNITED STATES MARINE CORPS

for service as set forth in the following CITATION:

For conspicuous gallantry and intrepidity at the risk of his life above and beyond the call of duty as a member of a Machine-gun Crew, serving with the First Battalion, Twenty-Sixth Marines, Fifth Marine Division, in action enemy Japanese forces during the seizure of Iwo Jima in the Volcano Islands, on 3 March 1945. Stationed in the front lines, Corporal Berry manned his weapon with alert readiness as he maintained a constant vigil with other members of his gun crew during the hazardous night hours. When infiltrating Japanese soldiers launched a surprise attack shortly after midnight in an attempt to overrun his position, he engaged in a pitched hand grenade duel, returning the dangerous weapons with prompt and deadly accuracy until an enemy grenade landed in the foxhole. Determined to save his comrades, he unhesitatingly chose to sacrifice himself and immediately dived on the deadly missile, absorbing the shattering violence of the exploding charge in his own body and protecting the others from serious injury. Stouthhearted [sic] and indomitable, Corporal Berry fearlessly yielded his own life that his fellow Marines might carry on the relentless battle against a ruthless enemy and his superb valor and unfaltering devotion to duty in the face of certain death reflect the highest credit upon himself and upon the United States Naval Service. He gallantly gave his life for his country.

/S/HARRY S. TRUMAN

=== Posthumous honors ===
The Erie Avenue Bridge in Lorain, Ohio, was renamed the Charles Berry Bridge in 1988, in honor of Cpl Berry, a native son of the city. The destroyer escort USS Charles Berry (DE-1035) was named in his honor.

== See also ==
- List of Medal of Honor recipients for World War II
- List of Medal of Honor recipients for the Battle of Iwo Jima
