= Robert Hugo Dunlap =

United States Marine Corps major (1920–2000)

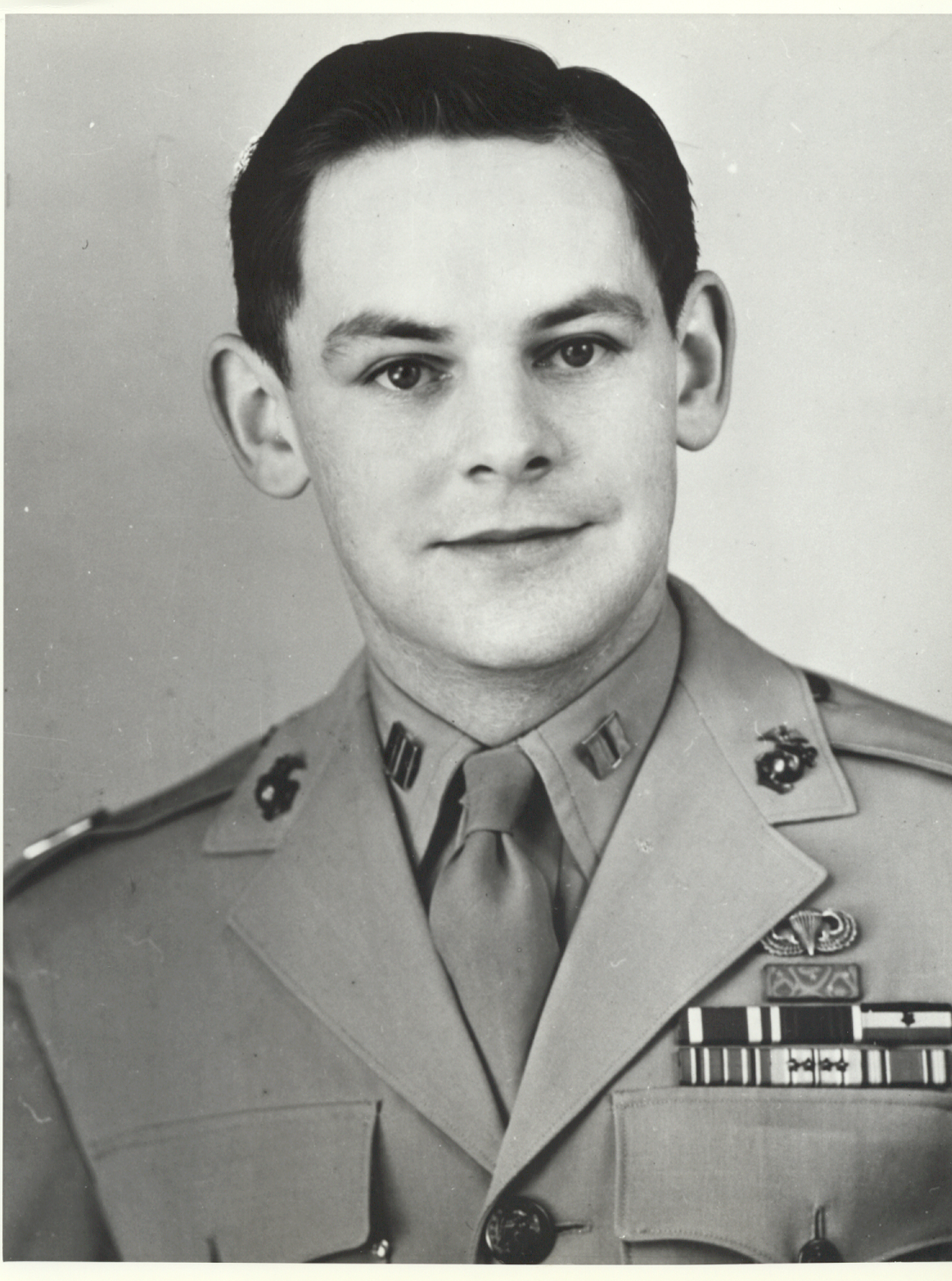
- Medal of Honor recipient
- Born: October 19, 1920; Abingdon, Illinois, U.S.
- Died: March 24, 2000 (aged 79); Monmouth, Illinois, U.S.
- Burial place: Warren County Memorial Park, Monmouth, Illinois
- Education: Monmouth College
- Military career
- Allegiance: United States of America
- Branch: United States Marine Corps
- Service years: 1942–1946
- Rank: Major
- Units: Company C, 1st Battalion, 26th Marines, 5th Marine Division
- Conflicts: World War II; Bougainville campaign; Battle of Iwo Jima
- Awards: Medal of Honor; Purple Heart Medal; Navy and Marine Corps Commendation Medal

Robert Hugo Dunlap (October 19, 1920 – March 24, 2000) was a United States Marine Corps major who received the Medal of Honor for heroism above and beyond the call of duty as a captain of a rifle company during the Battle of Iwo Jima in World War II.

== Early years ==
Dunlap was born in Abingdon, Illinois, on October 19, 1920. He went to school in Abingdon and graduated from high school in 1938. While in high school he was active in football, basketball and was a member of the track team. He also took part in the class plays.

He went on to Monmouth College in Monmouth, Illinois, where he was a prominent football player and trackman. Treasurer of the student body in his senior year, he majored in economics and business administration and minored in mathematics. He graduated in May 1942 with a Bachelor of Arts degree.

== U.S. Marine Corps Reserve ==
=== World War II ===
Five feet six inches tall, weighing 148 pounds, he enlisted in the Marine Corps Reserve on March 5, 1942, at age 21, while still a student at Monmouth College. He was promoted to private first class at that time and was placed on the inactive list with the Platoon Leaders' Unit of the 9th Reserve District until his graduation. Called to active duty in May 1942, he was transferred to the Officer Candidates Class at Quantico, Virginia. He was discharged as an enlisted man on July 17, 1942, and commissioned a second lieutenant the following day.

Following Reserve Officers Class at Quantico, 2dLt Dunlap requested parachute training and was ordered to the Parachute Training School at Camp Gillespie, San Diego, California. He was designated a Parachutist on November 23, 1942, and the next month was assigned to the 3rd Parachute Battalion. Advanced to first lieutenant in April 1943, he took part in the invasions of Vella Lavella and Bougainville in the Solomon Islands during the latter part of 1943.

During the Bougainville campaign, 1stLt Dunlap, while attached to the 1st Parachute Regiment, was awarded a Letter of Commendation (updated to a Navy and Marine Corps Commendation Medal) from Admiral William F. Halsey. On December 9, 1943, his rifle platoon was pinned down by heavy Japanese machine gun fire. As platoon leader, he exposed himself to the heavy fire and was able to rally his depleted platoon and maneuver it into position and reoccupy the lost ground. His commanding officer said of him at that time, "Apparently a very quiet, retiring personality, this officer demonstrated outstanding qualities of battlefield leadership. Skillful, courageous, and tenacious in adversity."

First Lieutenant Dunlap returned to the United States in March 1944 to join the 5th Marine Division then being formed at Camp Pendleton, Oceanside, California. The veteran officer became a machine gun platoon leader in Company G, 3rd Battalion, 26th Marines.

He departed for overseas duty for the second time in the summer of 1944, and on October 2, 1944, was promoted to captain. With his new rank he became commanding officer of Company C, 1st Battalion, 26th Marines, in which capacity he was serving when he earned the Medal of Honor at Iwo Jima.

As commanding officer of Company C, 1st Battalion, 26th Marines, 5th Marine Division, during the Iwo Jima campaign, Captain Dunlap led his company through a hail of artillery, mortar, rifle and machine gun fire in a determined advance from low ground uphill toward the steep cliffs from where the enemy poured a rain of bullets and shrapnel. It was the day following the original landing on February 19, 1945. When the volume of enemy fire finally became too intense to advance any further toward the caves located high to the front, Captain Dunlap held up his company and crawled alone approximately 200 yards forward of his front lines. From this position at the base of the cliff, about 50 yards from the Japanese lines, the captain spotted the enemy gun positions, and, returning to his own lines, relayed the vital information to the supporting artillery and naval gunfire units. Persistently disregarding his own safety, he then placed himself in an exposed vantage point to direct a more accurate supporting fire. Captain Dunlap worked without respite for two days and two nights under constant enemy fire, directing a bombardment against the enemy positions. During this critical phase of the battle, his company suffered heavy casualties, but by his leadership, Captain Dunlap spurred his men on to efforts which resulted in the final decisive defeat of Japanese countermeasures in that sector.

On February 26, 1945, Captain Dunlap was felled by a bullet wound in the left hip. He was evacuated from Iwo Jima and subsequently was a patient at the U.S. Naval Hospitals at Guam, Pearl Harbor, San Francisco, and Great Lakes, Illinois.

The Medal of Honor was awarded by President Harry S. Truman to Captain Dunlap in ceremonies at the White House on December 18, 1945. Later, after nearly 14 months of hospitalization, Captain Dunlap was discharged from the Great Lakes Naval Hospital on April 20, 1946. He went on inactive duty in September 1946 and was retired with the rank of major on December 1, 1946.

== Post war ==
Dunlap's daughter, Donna Butler, told the Galesburg Register-Mail newspaper in 2014 that after the war, her father spent about 18 years as a farmer in Abingdon before becoming a schoolteacher. He continued his work as an educator until he retired in 1982.

Dunlap was a member of the National Society of the Sons of the American Revolution along with his first cousin, Navy Vice Admiral James Bond Stockdale. Stockdale, who grew up in Abingdon alongside Dunlap, also earned a Medal of Honor for his actions in 1969 during the Vietnam War. In 2014, a veterans memorial in Abingdon was dedicated to the two men.

Dunlap kept the M1941 Johnson rifle he used on Iwo Jima and displayed it in his home; it has become a valued piece of local history. The rifle, serial number A0009, now resides on permanent public display at Simpson Ltd, Firearms for Collectors, in Galesburg, Illinois. In 1949, John Wayne contacted Dunlap on behalf of Paramount Pictures to ask him to consider selling the film rights to his story. Fearing the film would present an idealized portrait of the war, Dunlap declined the offer.

== Death ==
Dunlap died on March 24, 2000, at the age of 79. He was buried in Warren County Memorial Park in Monmouth, Illinois.

== Civilian and Military awards ==
In 1990, a terrace outside the Stockdale Center at Monmouth College was named for Dunlap. He had earlier been named to the sports Hall of Fame at the college as a football quarterback.

The Abingdon High School gymnasium was named in Dunlap's honor. The war memorial on the Warren County Courthouse lawn, in Monmouth, Illinois, was created in Dunlap's likeness.

Dunlap's military decorations and awards include:

Medal of Honor Purple Heart Medal
| Navy and Marine Corps Commendation Medal | Combat Action Ribbon | Navy Presidential Unit Citation (2 Awards) |
| American Campaign Medal | Asiatic-Pacific Campaign Medal with four campaign stars | World War II Victory Medal |

=== Medal of Honor citation ===
Dunlap's Medal of Honor citation reads:

The President of the United States takes pleasure in presenting the MEDAL OF HONOR to

CAPTAIN ROBERT H. DUNLAP
UNITED STATES MARINE CORPS RESERVE

for service as set forth in the following

CITATION:

For conspicuous gallantry and intrepidity at the risk of his life above and beyond the call of duty as Commanding Officer of Company C, First Battalion, Twenty-Sixth Marines, Fifth Marine Division, in action against enemy Japanese forces during the seizure of Iwo Jima in the Volcano Islands, on 20 and 21 February 1945. Defying uninterrupted blasts of Japanese artillery, mortar, rifle and machine gun fire, Captain Dunlap led his troops in a determined advance from low ground uphill toward the steep cliffs from which the enemy poured a devastating rain of shrapnel and bullets, steadily inching forward until the tremendous volume of enemy fire from the caves located high to his front temporarily halted his progress. Determined not to yield, he crawled alone approximately 200 yards forward of his front lines, took observation at the base of the cliff 50 yards from Japanese lines, located the enemy gun position and returned to his own lines where he relayed the vital information to supporting artillery and naval gunfire units. Persistently disregarding his own personal safety, he placed himself in an exposed vantage point to direct more accurately the supporting fire and, working without respite for two days and two nights under constant enemy fire, skillfully directed a smashing bombardment against the almost impregnable Japanese positions despite numerous obstacles and heavy Marine casualties. A brilliant leader, Captain Dunlap inspired his men to heroic efforts during this critical phase of the battle and by his cool decision, indomitable fighting spirit and daring tactics in the face of fanatic opposition greatly accelerated the final decisive defeat of Japanese countermeasures in his sector and materially furthered the continued advance of his company. His great personal valor and gallant spirit of self-sacrifice throughout the bitter hostilities reflect the highest credit upon Captain Dunlap and the United States Naval Service.

/S/ HARRY S. TRUMAN

== See also ==
- List of Medal of Honor recipients
- List of Medal of Honor recipients for World War II
- List of Medal of Honor recipients for the Battle of Iwo Jima
