= George Philip =

George Philip may refer to:

- George Philip (cartographer) (1800–1882), cartographer and map publisher
- George Philip (goalkeeper), Scottish football goalkeeper for Hearts and Dundee
- George Philip (footballer), Scottish footballer for Dundee and Sunderland in 1911–1921
- George Philip Jr. (1912–1945), US Navy Commander killed in action in World War II, namesake of USS George Philip (FFG-12)
  - USS George Philip

== See also ==
- George Phillips (disambiguation)
- George Philips (disambiguation)
