= Francis Junior Pierce =

U.S. Navy hospital corpsman

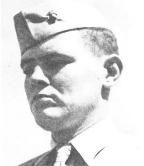
- Pharmacist’s Mate First Class Francis Junior Pierce
- Born: December 7, 1924; Earlville, Iowa
- Died: December 21, 1986 (aged 62); Grand Rapids, Michigan
- Burial place: Holy Cross Cemetery, Grand Rapids, Michigan
- Military career
- Allegiance: United States of America
- Branch: United States Navy; Michigan National Guard
- Service years: 1941–1945 (Navy); 1949–1950 (National Guard)
- Rank: Pharmacist’s Mate First Class (Navy); Second Lieutenant (National Guard)
- Units: 2nd Battalion 24th Marines, 4th Marine Division
- Conflicts: World War II; Battle of Saipan; Battle of Tinian; Battle of Iwo Jima
- Awards: Medal of Honor; Purple Heart Medal (2)
- Other work: Police officer

Francis Junior Pierce (December 7, 1924 – December 21, 1986) was a United States Navy hospital corpsman in World War II who received the nation's highest military decoration for valor, the Medal of Honor. He was awarded the medal for heroic actions "above and beyond the call of duty" on March 15–16, 1945, while assigned to a Marine Corps infantry battalion during the Battle of Iwo Jima.

== Biography ==
=== Early years and military service ===
Pierce was born on December 7, 1924, and grew up in Delaware County, Iowa. A week after his 17th birthday (the day Pearl Harbor was attacked), he enlisted in the U.S. Navy. After his initial training at the Great Lakes Naval Training Center in Great Lakes, Illinois, he attended the Hospital Corps School at Portsmouth, Virginia. Afterwards, he served at the naval hospital in Parris Island, South Carolina until August 1942. he was then transferred to the Fleet Marine Force (FMF) Field Medical Service School at Marine Corps Base Camp Lejeune, North Carolina, for field training with the Marine Corps.

In January 1944, he was assigned to the 4th Marine Division at Marine Corps Base Camp Pendleton, California where he was attached to the 2nd Battalion, 24th Marine Regiment of the division as a Fleet Marine Force hospital corpsman. He participated in numerous military campaigns including Saipan and Tinian. During the Battle of Iwo Jima in 1945, he helped in caring for and protecting wounded Marines and became one of four navy corpsman assigned to a Marine unit to receive the Medal for heroic actions during the battle; he was initially awarded the Navy Cross for actions on March 15, 1945, and the Silver Star Medal for actions in which he was wounded twice on March 16, 1945.

=== Retirement ===
On December 1, 1945, Pierce was honorably discharged from the Navy. After a brief stay in his hometown of Earlville, Iowa, he moved to Grand Rapids, Michigan. There, he married a young woman named Lorraine who he had been communicating with during the war and joined the Grand Rapids Police Department. He also briefly served in the Michigan National Guard from May 1949 to November 1950.

In 1948, Pierce was informed that the Navy Cross he received for extraordinary heroism and the Silver Star Medal for gallantry in action on Iwo Jima, were both being upgraded to the Medal of Honor. On June 25, 1948, he was presented the Medal of Honor by President Harry S. Truman during a ceremony held in the White House Rose Garden.

In civilian life, Pierce had two sons with his wife Lorraine. After she died, he married Madelyn Mellema and had two daughters. He served a long distinctive career in the police, carrying out many duties such as being the head of the vice squad and being a bomb disposal expert. He eventually became deputy chief of the Grand Rapids Police Department in 1972, and retired in 1982. Francis Pierce died of lung cancer in 1986.

=== Legacy ===
A special memorial scholarship was established by the Marine Corps in his name to honor navy hospital corpsmen.

== Medal of Honor citation ==
Pierce's Medal of Citation reads:

The President of the United States takes pleasure in presenting the MEDAL OF HONOR to

PHARMACIST MATE FIRST CLASS FRANCIS J. PIERCE
UNITED STATES NAVY

for service as set forth in the following

CITATION:

For conspicuous gallantry and intrepidity at the risk of his life above and beyond the call of duty while attached to the 2d Battalion, 24th Marines, 4th Marine Division, during the Iwo Jima campaign, 15 and 16 March 1945. Almost continuously under fire while carrying out the most dangerous volunteer assignments, Pierce gained valuable knowledge of the terrain and disposition of troops. Caught in heavy enemy rifle and machinegun fire which wounded a corpsman and 2 of the 8 stretcher bearers who were carrying 2 wounded marines to a forward aid station on 15 March, Pierce quickly took charge of the party, carried the newly wounded men to a sheltered position, and rendered first aid. After directing the evacuation of 3 of the casualties, he stood in the open to draw the enemy's fire and, with his weapon blasting, enabled the litter bearers to reach cover. Turning his attention to the other 2 casualties he was attempting to stop the profuse bleeding of 1 man when a Japanese fired from a cave less than 20 yards away and wounded his patient again. Risking his own life to save his patient, Pierce deliberately exposed himself to draw the attacker from the cave and destroyed him with the last of his ammunition Then lifting the wounded man to his back, he advanced unarmed through deadly rifle fire across 200 feet of open terrain. Despite exhaustion and in the face of warnings against such a suicidal mission, he again traversed the same fire-swept path to rescue the remaining marine. On the following morning, he led a combat patrol to the sniper nest and, while aiding a stricken Marine, was seriously wounded. Refusing aid for himself, he directed treatment for the casualty, at the same time maintaining protective fire for his comrades. Completely fearless, completely devoted to the care of his patients, Pierce inspired the entire battalion. His valor in the face of extreme peril sustains and enhances the finest traditions of the U.S. Naval Service.

Harry S. Truman

== Awards and Decoration ==

1st row	Medal of Honor		Purple Heart with 5/16 inch star
2nd row	Combat Action Ribbon Retroactively Awarded, 1999	Presidential Unit Citation with 1 Service star	Navy Unit Commendation
3rd row	Navy Good Conduct Medal	American Defense Service Medal	American Campaign Medal
4th row	Asiatic-Pacific Campaign Medal with FMF Device and 4 Campaign stars	World War II Victory Medal	National Defense Service Medal

== See also ==
- List of Medal of Honor recipients for the Battle of Iwo Jima
