= 5th Marine Division =

WW2 US Marine Corps formation

- 5th Marine Division insignia
- Active: 11 November 1943 – 5 February 1946; 1 March 1966 – 26 November 1969
- Country: United States of America
- Branch: United States Marine Corps
- Type: Marine Ground Combat Division
- Role: Locate close with and destroy the enemy by fire and maneuver
- Nickname: The Spearhead / Fighting Fifth
- Mascot: A lion named "Roscoe"
- Engagements: World War II; Battle of Iwo Jima; Vietnam War; Battle of Khe Sanh (26th Marines)

Commanders
- Notable commanders: Keller E. Rockey; Thomas E. Bourke; Wood B. Kyle; Leo J. Dulacki

The 5th Marine Division was a United States Marine Corps ground combat division which was activated on 11 November 1943 (officially activated on 21 January 1944) at Camp Pendleton, California during World War II. The 5th Division saw its first combat action during the Battle of Iwo Jima in 1945 where it sustained the highest number of casualties of the three Marine divisions of the V Amphibious Corps (invasion force). The 5th Division was to be part of the planned invasion of the Japan homeland before Japan surrendered. Assault troops of the 5th Division were included in the Presidential Unit Citation awarded to the V Amphibious Corps for extraordinary heroism on Iwo Jima from 19 to 28 February 1945. The 5th Division was deactivated on 5 February 1946.

The 5th Division was ordered to be reactivated on 1 March 1966 at Camp Pendleton, California, during the Vietnam War. The division, beginning with the reactivation of Regimental Landing Team 26 (RLT 26), was expected to be fully manned within one year; the 5th Division was never in command of the 26th Marine Regiment (26th Marines) in the war. In December, all three infantry battalions of the 26th Marines were fighting in South Vietnam attached to the 3rd Marine Division. By June 1967, the 5th Division was ready to deploy anywhere. It was never intended that the 5th Division would go overseas. It was a force in readiness. But in February 1968, General William C. Westmoreland, U.S. Army, commander of U.S. forces in South Vietnam, asked for help because of the all-out Communist Tet Offensive. The 27th Marine Regiment (27th Marines), 5th Marine Division, was airlifted out on 48 hours' notice, with 3,700 Marines. In September, it became the first major combat unit to come home from the Vietnam War. The 5th Marine Division formally deactivated on 26 November 1969.

== History ==
=== World War II ===
5th Marine Division Battle of Iwo Jima order of battle (click to enlarge)

The 5th Marine Division was activated on Armistice Day, 11 November 1943. The division's Headquarters Battalion officially began operating at Marine Corps Base Camp Pendleton on 1 December, at which time men and equipment began streaming into Camp Pendleton. The official activation date for the Division was 21 January 1944.

The division was formed around a solid core of combat veterans and experienced cadremen; among the personnel were Marines from the former 1st Marine Parachute Regiment, the Raider Training Battalion, the Parachute Training School, West Coast, and the Parachute Replacement Company. However, there were many issues obtaining the total required number of Marines for the division, as the Marine Corps also had to provide combat replacements to other divisions as well as staff the newly-formed 6th Marine Division.

Parts of the division began to deploy overseas to act as the reserve force during the Battle of Guam where they were not needed. Because of this they were sent to Camp Tarawa near Hilo, Hawaii for further training. While there the 31st Naval Construction Battalion was attached to the Division tasked as shore party for the upcoming operation. After more extensive training the division loaded ships and left Hawaii in January 1945. By mid-February they were sailing past Saipan headed for Iwo Jima.

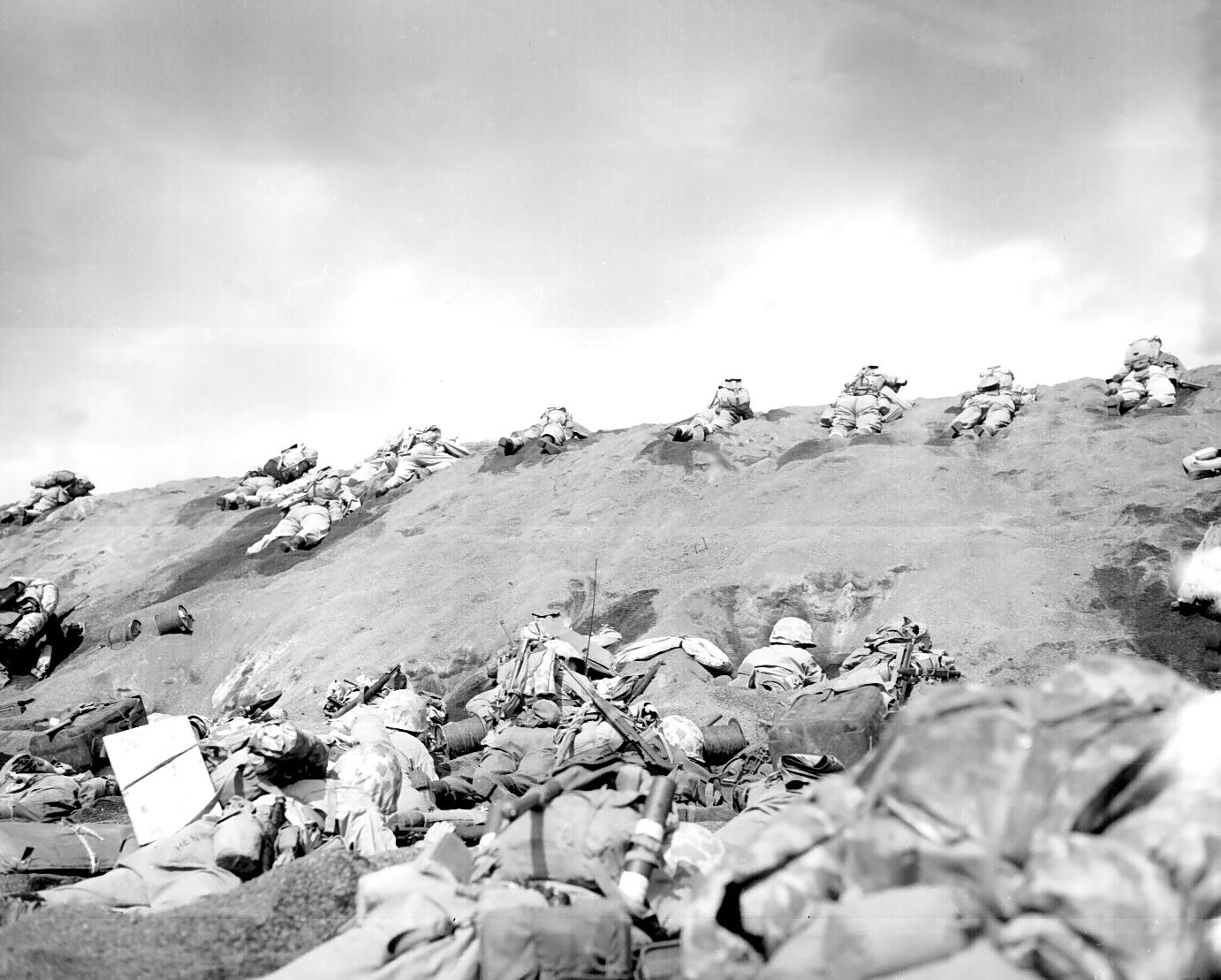
Marines of 5th Marine Division on Red Beach, Iwo Jima 19 February 1945

==== Battle of Iwo Jima ====
(Presidential Unit Citation: Assault Troops, Fifth Amphibious Corps, 19 to 28 February 1945)

The 5th Division landed on beaches red 1, red 2 and green 1 at the base of Mount Suribachi on 19 February 1945 on Iwo Jima. The division sustained heavy initial losses, so much so that by that afternoon, the 26th Marine Regiment (26th Marines) had to be released as the division reserve. On 23 February, two American flags were raised on Mount Suribachi by members of the 28th Marine Regiment (28th Marines). The 5th Division would fight on Iwo Jima from 19 February until 26 March where they would sustain 2,482 killed in action, 19 missing in action, and 6,218 wounded in action. This was the highest casualty rate among the three Marine divisions involved in the invasion. The 5th Division began loading onto ships on 26 March, finally leaving Iwo Jima on 27 March 1945 sailing for Hawaii.

On 21 March 1945 the 5th Marine Division Cemetery was formally dedicated on Iwo Jima. Chaplains prayed, Major General Keller E. Rockey added a tribute to the dead and Lieutenant Roland B. Gittelsohn, U.S. Navy and a 5th Division chaplain, spoke of friends buried and "the ghastly price of freedom...." The American flag (there since 14 March) at the northern part of Iwo Jima was raised then lowered to half-staff. Taps was played echoing across the dark foreboding ash of "Sulfur Island".

Iwo Jima became an important support and emergency landing field for aircraft based out of the Marianas. In recognition of the 5th Marine Division's sacrifice in securing the island, the U.S. Army Air Corps 9th Bombardment Group named a B-29 "The Spearhead", with elaborate nose art depicting the 5th Division's insignia and the flag raising on Mt. Suribachi.

The 5th Division returned to Camp Tarawa, Hawaii and remained there until the end of the war. After the Japanese surrender they set sail for Japan where they occupied the southern island of Kyushu. The 5th Division left Japan in November 1945 and arrived in San Diego, California the week of Christmas 1945. The majority of the division's Marines were discharged shortly thereafter. The 5th Division was inactivated on 5 February 1946.

=== Vietnam War ===
(Presidential Unit Citation: 26th Marines, 3rd Marine Division (Reinforced), 20 January to 1 April 1968)

The 27th Marines and 5th Tank Battalion were activated on 1 January 1966, the 5th Marine Division and 26th Marines on 1 March, the 13th Marines (13th Regiment of Artillery) on 1 May (Headquarter on 5 April), and the 28th Marines on 17 January 1967. The 13th, 26th, and 27th regiments were attached to the 3rd Marine Division (Reinforced), 1st Marine Division (Reinforced), and 9th Marine Amphibious Brigade in South Vietnam until 19 March 1970.

On 27 February 1966, Secretary of Defense McNamara ordered the reactivation of RLT 26 (26th Marine Regiment) and the 5th Marine Division (5th Division headquarters was activated in June) at Camp Pendleton on 1 March 1966. BLT 1/26 (1st Battalion, 26th Marine Regiment) was activated on 1 May, BLT 2/26 (2nd Battalion, 26th Marines) on 1 June, and RLT 3/26 (3rd Battalion, 26th Marines) on 1 July. Each battalion received eight weeks of pre-deployment training, all Vietnam oriented, before moving out aboard navy transports on 6 July, 27 July, and 1 September. The 26th Regiment (26th Marines) was part of the 5th Division, but never came under its command; under base command then subordinate of Force Troops, Pacific, at Twentynine Palms. The 26th Marines were based in Vietnam beginning on 27 August 1966 (2nd Battalion, 26 Marines, 3rd Marine Division Reinforced) until 19 March 1970, but were never commanded there by the 5th Division.

The 5th Division was ready to deploy anywhere by June 1967. It was never intended that the 5th Division would go overseas. It was a force in readiness. But in February 1968, General William C. Westmoreland, U.S. Army, commander of U.S. forces in South Vietnam, asked for help because of the all-out Communist Tet Offensive. The 27th Marines, 5th Marine Division, was airlifted out on 48 hours' notice, with 3,700 Marines. In September, it became the first major combat unit to come home from the Vietnam War. The 5th Division began deactivating its member units on 15 October 1969. The 5th Division was formally inactivated on 26 November 1969, and the men reformed into the 5th Marine Expeditionary Brigade.

==== Battle of Khe Sanh and Tet Offensive, 1968 ====
The 26th Marines participated in the Battle of Khe Sanh, 9 January to 9 July 1968 and was awarded a Presidential Unit Citation for its actions at Khe Sanh from 20 January to 1 April 1968 while attached to the 3rd Marine Division (Reinforced).

In February 1968, General William Westmoreland, the commander of U.S. forces in Vietnam asked for help in Vietnam because of the Communist Tet Offensive. President Johnson then committed more troops to the war effort. On 12 February 1968, the 27th Marines, 5th Marine Division, was ordered to Vietnam and deployed on 17 to 19 February. The 27th Marines became the first Marine regiment to fly into a combat zone in Vietnam. The 3rd Battalion, 27th Marines, which deployed on 17 February, was awarded a Meritorious Unit Commendation for action during Operation Allen Brook at Go Noi Island on 17 to 28 February while attached to the 1st Marine Division (Reinforced). During this operation, 3/27 members earned a Medal of Honor, 2 Navy Crosses, and several Silver Star Medals and Bronze Star Medals with Combat "V"s. In September 1968, The 27th Marines, after serving seven months in country, became the first major combat unit to come home from Vietnam. All first tour personnel were reassigned to other units in order to complete their tours.

==== 26th Marines ====
1st Battalion, 26th Marines: Activated on 1 May 1966. Moved out of Camp Pendleton on 6 July and was assigned to the 7th Fleet's Special Landing Force on 5 August. It participated in the 26th Marines first combat operation in Vietnam off the assault helicopter carrier USS Iwo Jima during Operation Deckhouse III and taking the regiments first four casualties. The 1/26 Marines was based in South Vietnam on 27 September 1966.

2nd Battalion, 26th Marines: Activated on 1 June 1966. Moved out of Camp Pendleton on 27 July and boarded the USS Bexar. The 2/26 Marines arrived in Da Nang, South Vietnam on 27 August 1966.

3rd Battalion, 26th Marines: Activated on 1 July 1966. Moved out of Camp Pendleton on 2 September and was assigned to the 7th Fleet's Special Landing Force on 4 October. The 3/26 Marines was based in Vietnam on 11 December 1966.

==== 27th and 28th Marines ====
The 27th Marine Regiment (27th Marines), 5th Marine Division, would receive orders on 12 February 1968 to deploy to Vietnam, with 1/27 Marines arriving at Da Nang, South Vietnam on 23 February. On 2, 1 April/27 Marines was attached to the 1st Marine Division. The 28th Marine Regiment (28th Marines) would remain at Camp Pendleton throughout the Vietnam War.

==== 13th Marines ====
Kilo Battery, 13th Marine Regiment (13th Marines), landed at the mouth of the Cua Viet River in Vietnam in May 1967. Alpha, Bravo, and Charlie 1/13 were present at the Battle of Khe Sanh in 1968.

==== 5th Tank Battalion ====
WWII

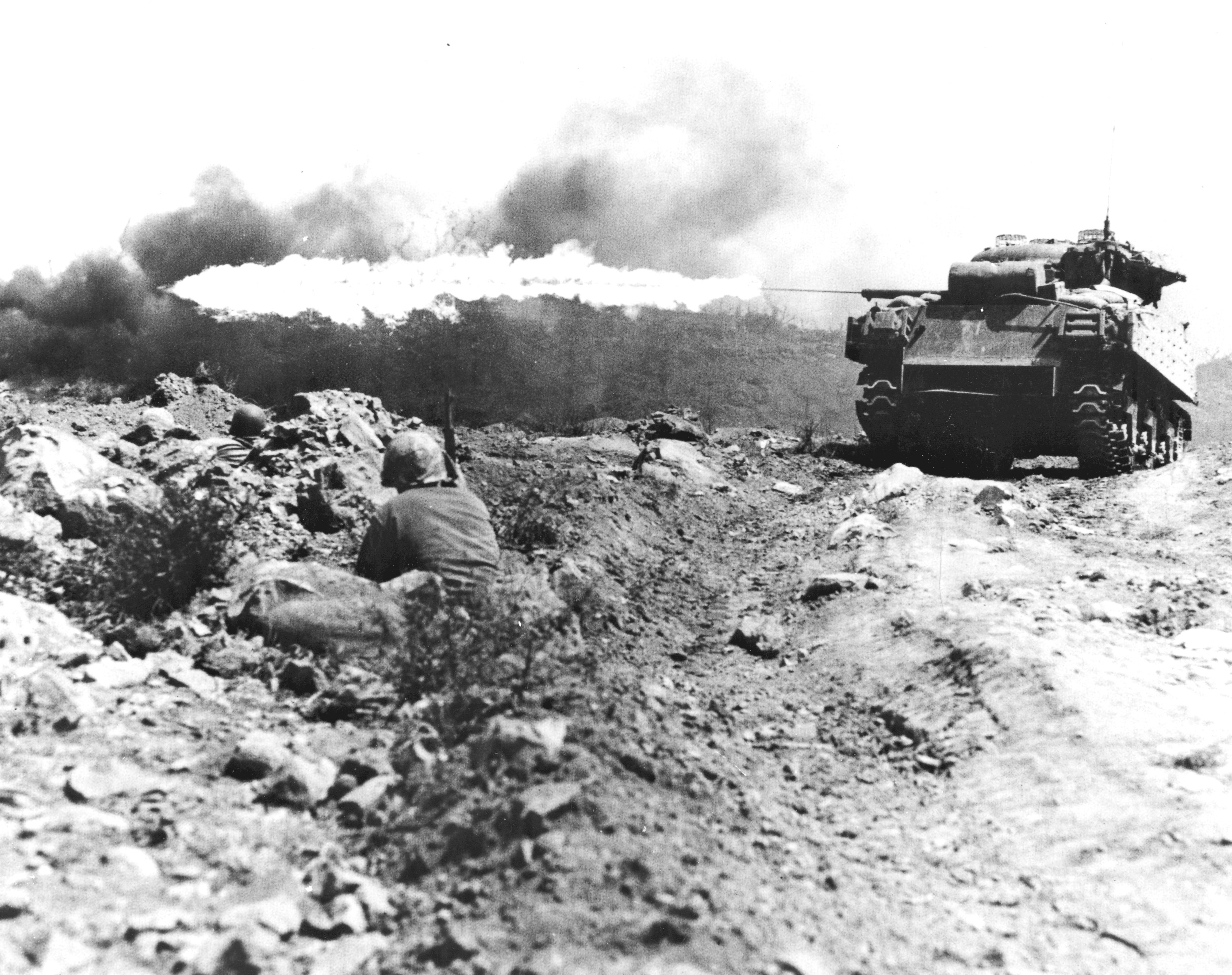
The CB-H2 flamethrower seen here on Iwo Jima had a range of 150 yards

In May 1944 the 5th Tank Battalion commanded by Lt. Colonel William R. Collins was posted to Schofield Barracks in the Territory of Hawaii. They were attached to the Army's Chemical Warfare Service CENPAC under Col. Unmacht (USA). They were part of a top secret program to develop flamethrowing tanks with Seabees from the 117th CB and the 43rd Chemical Laboratory Company. Eventually the Battalion would get four M4-3A Sherman's modified with a CB-H1-H2 flamethrowers for Iwo Jima. Those tanks used between 5–10,000 gallons of napalm per day near the end of the battle. Early in the assault it was decided that the tanks from all three Divisions would be consolidated into a Regimental command under Lt. Colonel Collins.

- 5th Marine CB-H1 in action on D+22,
- The 5th tank Battalion received a Presidential Unit Citation.

Vietnam

The 5th Tank Battalion (RLT 26, RLT 27, and RLT 28) was attached to the 1st Marine Division (Reinforced) and staged in the Philippines from Camp Pendleton, California. The Battalion departed Subic Bay aboard the USS Washtenaw County for Da Nang in July 1967. The unit provided mission fire control support at every strategic hill in South Vietnam, and received two Presidential Unit Citations (PUC) for extraordinary heroism in the battles at Khe Sanh and Hue City. Ord & Maint Co. suffered heavy losses on Hill 88 as 21 Marines perished from mortar fire falling on the 105mm ordnance bunker. This was the highest number of casualties suffered in a single day by the 5th Tank Battalion during the Vietnam War.

Note: Only A Company and B Company were sent to Vietnam with the 26th and 27th Marine Regiments, (Capt. Robert Johnstone was the OIC). C Company and D Company remained in garrison at Camp Pendleton. As the result of President Nixon's draw down in troop strength Bravo Company returned to Camp Pendleton in September 1968.

== Casualties ==
=== World War II ===
- Killed in Action/Died of Wounds/Missing in Action – 2,501
- Wounded in Action – 5,948
- Total Casualties– 8,363

=== Vietnam War ===
- Killed in Action/Died of Wounds – N/A
- Wounded in Action – N/A
- Total Casualties– N/A

== Medal of Honor recipients ==

Fifteen Marines and 2 Navy corpsmen assigned to the 5th Marine Division were awarded the Medal of Honor for World War II (Iwo Jima). Twelve were posthumously awarded. Two Marines of the 26th and 27th Marines were posthumously awarded the Medal of Honor for the Vietnam War.

=== World War II ===
- Robert Hugo Dunlap
- William G. Harrell
- Jacklyn Harrell Lucas
- Franklin E. Sigler
- George Wahlen, USN

Posthumous

- Charles J. Berry
- William R. Caddy
- Joseph R. Julian
- James D. LaBelle
- Jack Lummus
- Harry L. Martin
- George Phillips
- Donald J. Ruhl
- Tony Stein
- William G. Walsh
- Jack Williams
- John H. Willis, USN

=== Vietnam War ===
Posthumous

- Robert C. Burke (attached to 1st Marine Division)
- Karl G. Taylor Sr. (attached to 3rd Marine Division)

== Unit awards ==
=== World War II ===
- Presidential Unit Citation: Assault Troops, V Amphibious Corps (Reinforced), 19 to 28 February 1945 (Battle of Iwo Jima): (5th Marine Division)
- Navy Unit Commendation: Support Troops, V Amphibious Corps (Reinforced), 19 to 28 February 1945 (Battle of Iwo Jima): (5th Marine Division)

=== Vietnam War ===
- Presidential Unit Citation: 26th Marines (Reinforced), 3rd Marine Division (Reinforced), 20 January to 1 April 1968 (Battle of Khe Sanh)
- Presidential Unit Citation: 3rd Marine Division, 8 March 1965 to 15 September 1967: (26th Marines)
- Presidential Unit Citation: 1st Marine Division (Reinforced), 14 March 1967 to October 1969: (5th Tank Battalion)

== Organization ==
=== World War II ===
- Headquarters Battalion
- 13th Marine Regiment
- 26th Marine Regiment
- 27th Marine Regiment
- 28th Marine Regiment
- 5th Tank Battalion
- 5th Engineer Battalion
- 5th Pioneer Battalion
- Division Service Troops:
  - 5th Service Battalion
  - 5th Motor Transportation Battalion
  - 5th Medical Battalion
- Attached units:
  - 2nd Armored Amphibian Tractor Battalion
  - 3rd Amphibian Tractor Battalion
  - 5th Amphibian Tractor Battalion
  - 11th Amphibian Tractor Battalion
  - 27th Replacement Draft
  - 31st Replacement Draft
  - 5th Joint Assault Signal Company
  - 5th Marine Observation Squadron
  - 6th Marine War Dog Platoon
  - 3rd Platoon, 2nd Laundry Company
  - 5th Shore Party, 16th Marine Regiment

=== Vietnam War ===
- 26th Marine Regiment
- 27th Marine Regiment
- 28th Marine Regiment
- 13th Marine Regiment
- 3rd Military Police Battalion
- 5th Military Police Battalion
- 5th Tank Battalion
- Communications Company Headquarters Battalion

== See also ==
- Flags of Our Fathers
- List of United States Marine Corps divisions
- Organization of the United States Marine Corps
- Marine Corps War Memorial
