= USS LST-481 =

US Navy tank landing ship

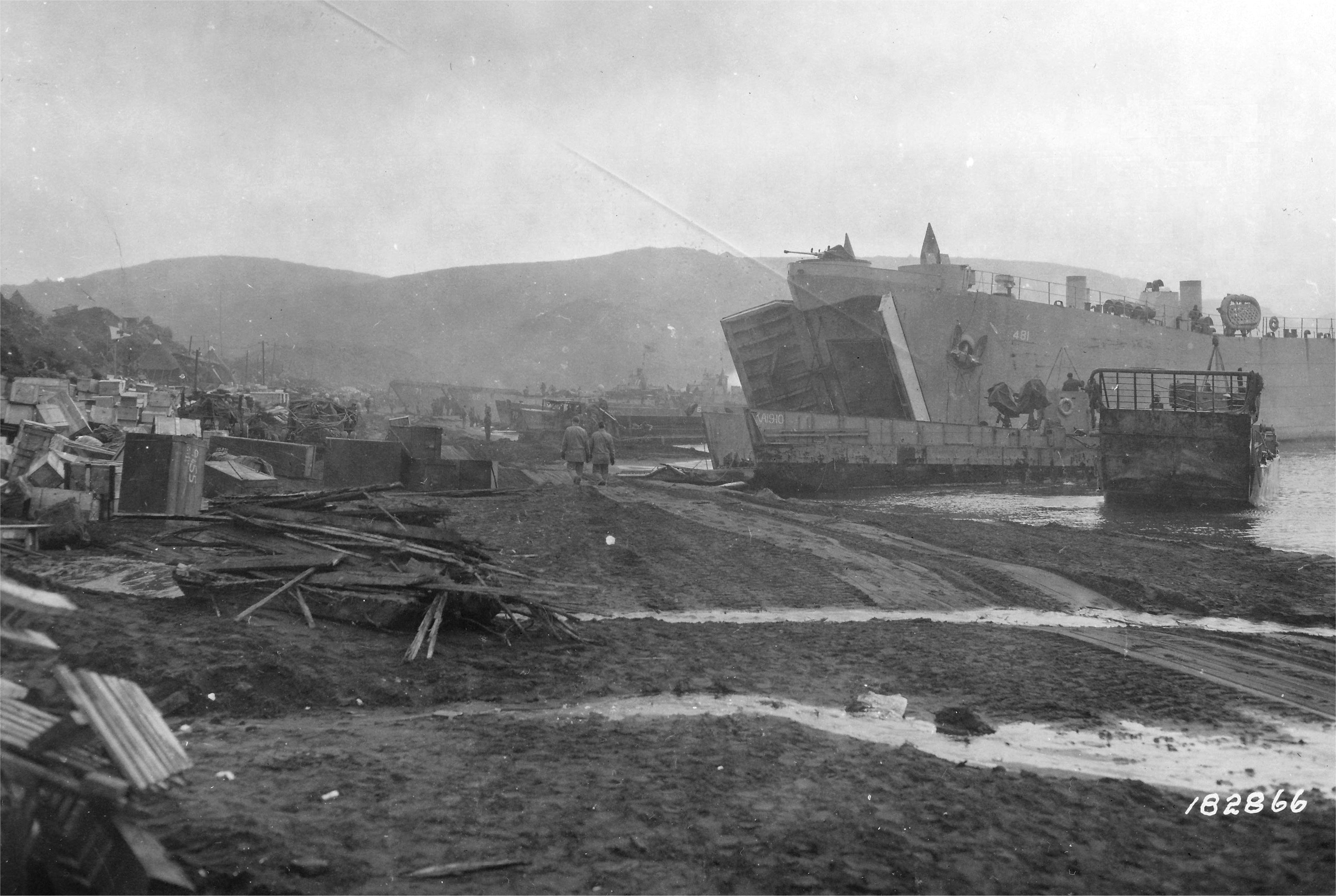
- USS LST-481, unloading on the beach at Kiska, Alaska, 23 August 1943.

History

United States
- Name: LST-481
- Ordered: as a Type S3-M-K2 hull, MCE hull 1001
- Builder: Permanente Metals Corporation, Richmond, California
- Yard number: 36
- Laid down: 4 September 1942
- Launched: 2 December 1942
- Commissioned: 15 May 1943
- Decommissioned: 28 February 1946
- Stricken: 12 April 1946
- Identification: Hull symbol: LST-481; Code letters: NGQW
- Honors and awards: 6 × battle stars
- Fate: Sold for scrapping, 28 April 1948

General characteristics
- Class & type: LST-1-class tank landing ship
- Displacement: 4,080 long tons (4,145 t) full load; 2,160 long tons (2,190 t) landing
- Length: 328 ft (100 m) oa
- Beam: 50 ft (15 m)
- Draft: Full load: 8 ft 2 in (2.49 m) forward; 14 ft 1 in (4.29 m) aft; Landing at 2,160 t: 3 ft 11 in (1.19 m) forward; 9 ft 10 in (3.00 m) aft
- Installed power: 2 × 900 hp (670 kW) Electro-Motive Diesel 12-567A diesel engines; 1,700 shp (1,300 kW)
- Propulsion: 1 × Falk main reduction gears; 2 × Propellers
- Speed: 12 kn (22 km/h; 14 mph)
- Range: 24,000 nmi (44,000 km; 28,000 mi) at 9 kn (17 km/h; 10 mph) while displacing 3,960 long tons (4,024 t)
- Boats & landing craft carried: 2 or 6 x LCVPs
- Capacity: 2,100 tons oceangoing maximum; 350 tons main deckload
- Troops: 16 officers, 147 enlisted men
- Complement: 13 officers, 104 enlisted men
- Armament: Varied, ultimate armament; 2 × twin 40 mm (1.57 in) Bofors guns; 4 × single 40 mm Bofors guns; 12 × 20 mm (0.79 in) Oerlikon cannons

Service record
- Part of: LST Flotilla 3 at Adak Island; LST Flotilla 5 at Guam
- Operations: Gilbert Islands operations (12 November–8 December 1943); Occupation of Kwajalein and Majuro Atolls (31 January–8 February 1944); Battle of Hollandia (21–26 April 1944); Capture and occupation of Guam (21–28 July 1944); Assault and occupation of Iwo Jima (19–25 February 1945); Assault and occupation of Okinawa Gunto (1–10 April 1945)
- Awards: Combat Action Ribbon; American Campaign Medal; Asiatic–Pacific Campaign Medal; World War II Victory Medal; Navy Occupation Service Medal w/Asia Clasp

USS LST-481 was a United States Navy LST-1-class tank landing ship used in the Asiatic-Pacific Theater during World War II.

== Construction ==
LST-481 was laid down on 4 September 1942, under Maritime Commission (MARCOM) contract, MC hull 1001, by Kaiser Shipyards, Yard No. 4, Richmond, California; launched on 2 December 1942; and commissioned on 15 May 1943.

== Service history ==
During the war, LST-481 was assigned to the Pacific Theater of Operations. She took part in the Gilbert Islands operation, November and December 1943; the Occupation of Kwajalein and Majuro Atolls in February 1944; the Battle of Hollandia in April 1944; the Battle of Guam in July 1944; the Battle of Iwo Jima in February 1945; and the Battle of Okinawa in April 1945.

== Post-war service ==
Following the war, LST-481 performed occupation duty in the Far East until mid-November 1945. She returned to the United States and was decommissioned on 28 February 1946, and struck from the Navy list on 12 April 1946. On 16 April 1948, the ship was sold to the Bethlehem Steel Co., Bethlehem, Pennsylvania, and subsequently scrapped.

== Awards ==
LST-481 earned six battle stars for her World War II service.

== Notes ==
Citations

== Bibliography ==
Online resources

- "LST-481". Dictionary of American Naval Fighting Ships. Naval History and Heritage Command. This article incorporates text from this source, which is in the public domain.
- "Kaiser Permanente No. 4, Richmond CA". www.ShipbuildingHistory.com. 5 February 2014.
- "USS LST-481". NavSource. 31 October 2014.
