= George Phillips (USMC) =

US Marine and Medal of Honor recipient (1926–1945)

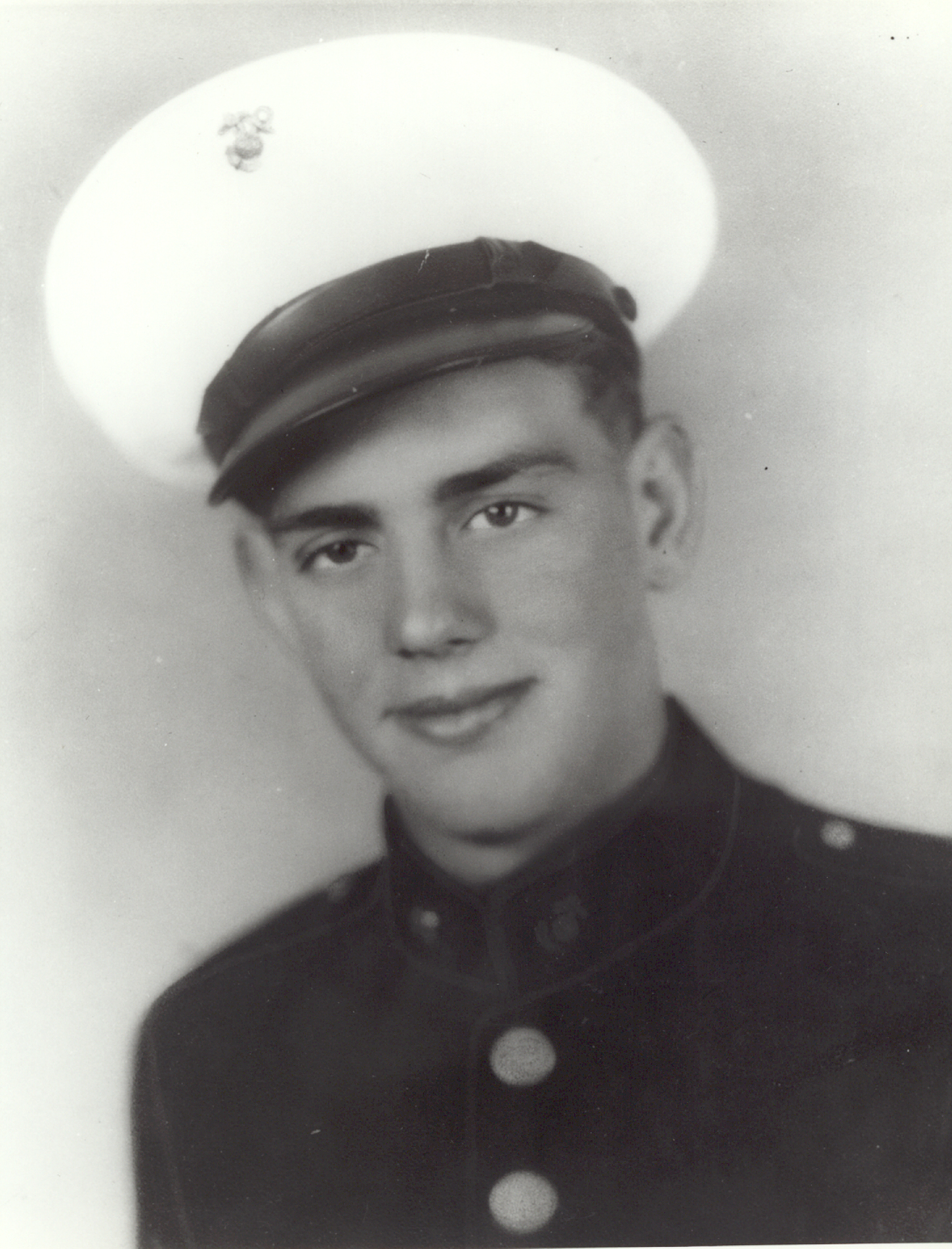
- George Phillips, Medal of Honor recipients
- Born: July 14, 1926; Rich Hill, Missouri
- Died: March 14, 1945 (aged 18); Iwo Jima, Volcano Islands, Japanese Empire
- Burial place: Initially the 5th Marine Division Cemetery on Iwo Jima: Reinterred in Bethel Cemetery, Labadie, Missouri
- Military career
- Allegiance: United States of America
- Branch: United States Marine Corps
- Service years: 1944–45
- Rank: Private
- Units: 2nd Battalion, 28th Marines, 5th Marine Division
- Conflicts: World War II; Pacific War; Japan campaign; Volcano and Ryukyu Islands campaign; Battle of Iwo Jima †
- Awards: Medal of Honor; Purple Heart

Private George Phillips (July 14, 1926 – March 14, 1945) was a United States Marine who was posthumously awarded the Medal of Honor for sacrificing his own life to save the lives of fellow Marines on Iwo Jima by throwing himself over an activated hand grenade.

== Biography ==
George Phillips was born in Bates County, Missouri on July 14, 1926, and worked on the railroad before enlisting in the United States Marine Corps at the age of 17 on April 25, 1944.

During the Battle of Iwo Jima, the night of March 14, 1945, Private Phillips was standing guard as the other Marines in his unit were resting. A Japanese soldier tossed a hand grenade toward the group. Realizing the gravity of the situation, Phillips sacrificed his life by smothering the blast of the grenade with his own body to save the lives of his fellow Marines. For this action, he was awarded his nation's highest military decoration – the Medal of Honor. The decoration was received by his uncle, with whom Private Phillips had formerly resided.

Initially buried in the 5th Marine Division Cemetery on Iwo Jima, Pvt Phillips' remains were reinterred in Bethel Cemetery, Labadie, Missouri, in 1948.

== Medal of Honor citation ==
The President of the United States takes pride in presenting the MEDAL OF HONOR posthumously to

PRIVATE GEORGE PHILLIPS
UNITED STATES MARINE CORPS RESERVE

for service as set forth in the following CITATION:

For conspicuous gallantry and intrepidity at the risk of his life above and beyond the call of duty while serving with Second Battalion, Twenty-eight Marines, Fifth Marine Division, in action against enemy Japanese forces during the seizure of Iwo Jima in the Volcano Islands, on 14 March 1945. Standing the fox-hole watch while other members of his squad rested after a night of bitter hand grenade fighting against infiltrating Japanese troops, Private Phillips was the only member of his unit alerted when an enemy hand grenade was tossed into their midst. Instantly shouting a warning, he unhesitatingly threw himself on the deadly missile, absorbing the shattering violence of the exploding charge in his own body and protecting his comrades from serious injury. Stouthearted and indomitable, Private Phillips willingly yielded his own life that his fellow Marines might carry on the relentless battle against a fanatic enemy and his superb valor and unfaltering spirit of self-sacrifice in the face of certain death reflect the highest credit upon himself and upon the United States Naval Service. He gallantly gave his life for his country.

/S/ HARRY S. TRUMAN

== Awards and decorations ==

1st row	Medal of Honor		
2nd row	Purple Heart	Combat Action Ribbon	Presidential Unit Citation
3rd row	American Campaign Medal	Asiatic-Pacific Campaign Medal with 1 Campaign star	World War II Victory Medal

== See also ==
- List of Medal of Honor recipients
- List of Medal of Honor recipients for World War II
- List of Medal of Honor recipients for the Battle of Iwo Jima
