= George Phillips (priest) =

The Venerable George Edward Phillips was an Archdeacon in the Diocese of Rupert's Land from 1958 until 1967.

Phillips was educated at St. John's College, Manitoba and ordained in 1933. After a curacy in Roblin held incumbencies at Shoal Lakes and Winnipeg. He was also a Chaplain in the RCAF from 1942 to 1945.
