= Volcano Islands =

Group of Japanese-governed islands in Micronesia

Native name: 火山列島
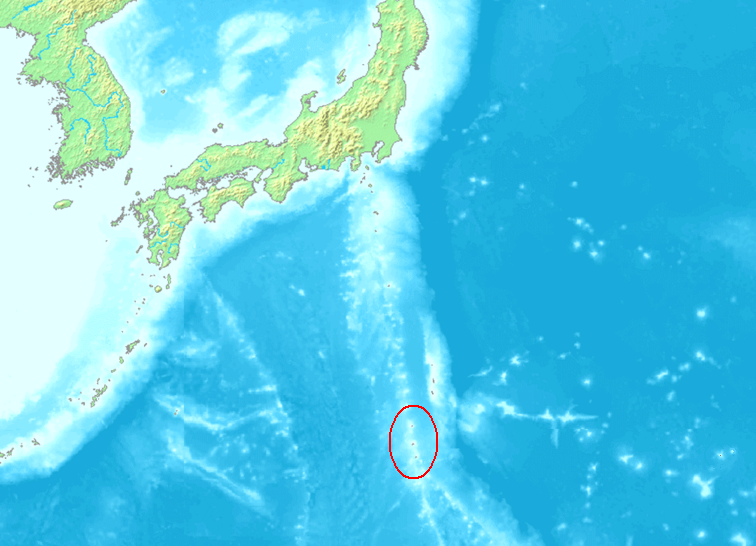
- Location in the Pacific

Geography
- Location: Pacific Ocean
- Coordinates: 24°46′N 141°18′E
- Total islands: 3
- Area: 32.55 km^{2} (12.57 sq mi)

Administration
- Japan
- Prefecture: Tokyo
- Subprefecture: Ogasawara Subprefecture
- Village: Ogasawara

Demographics
- Population: 380 (January 2008)

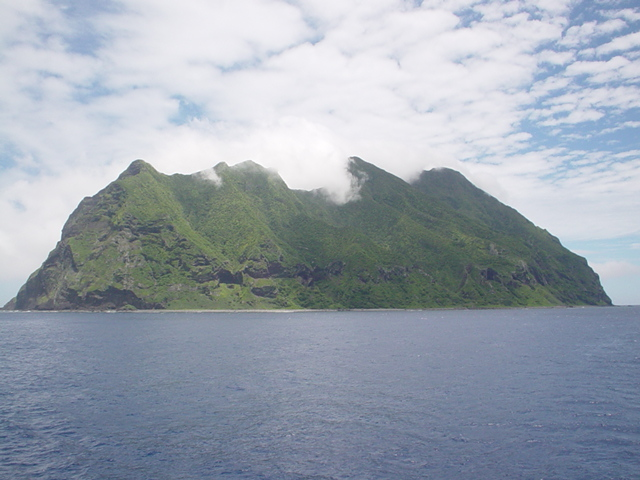
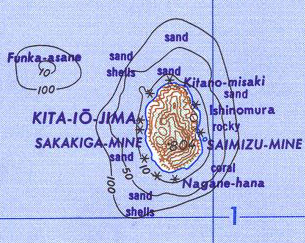
Kita Iwo Jima
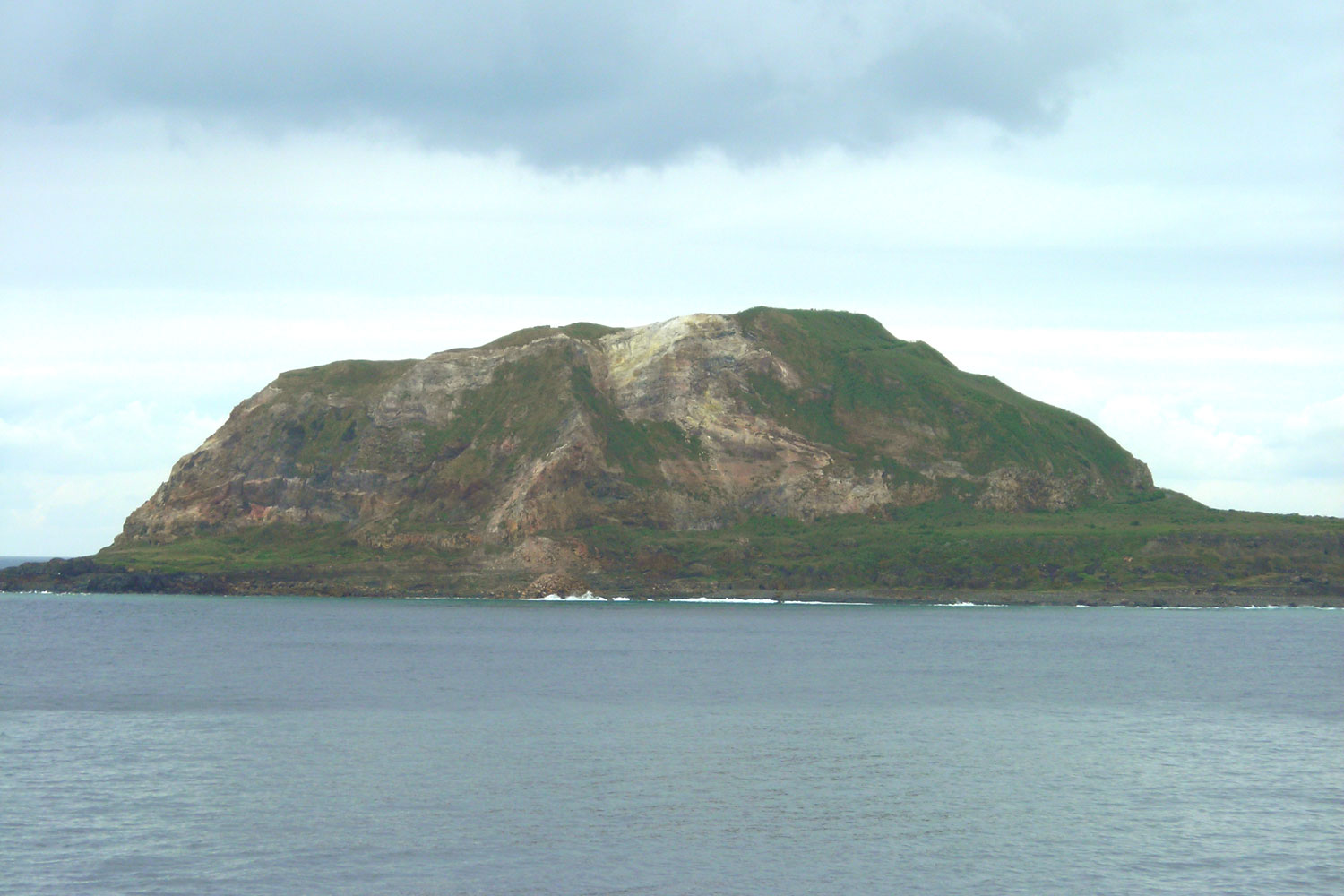
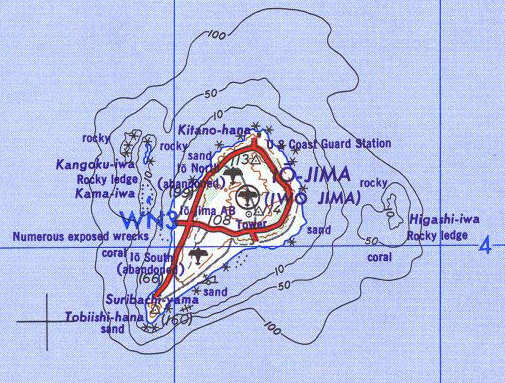
Iwo Jima
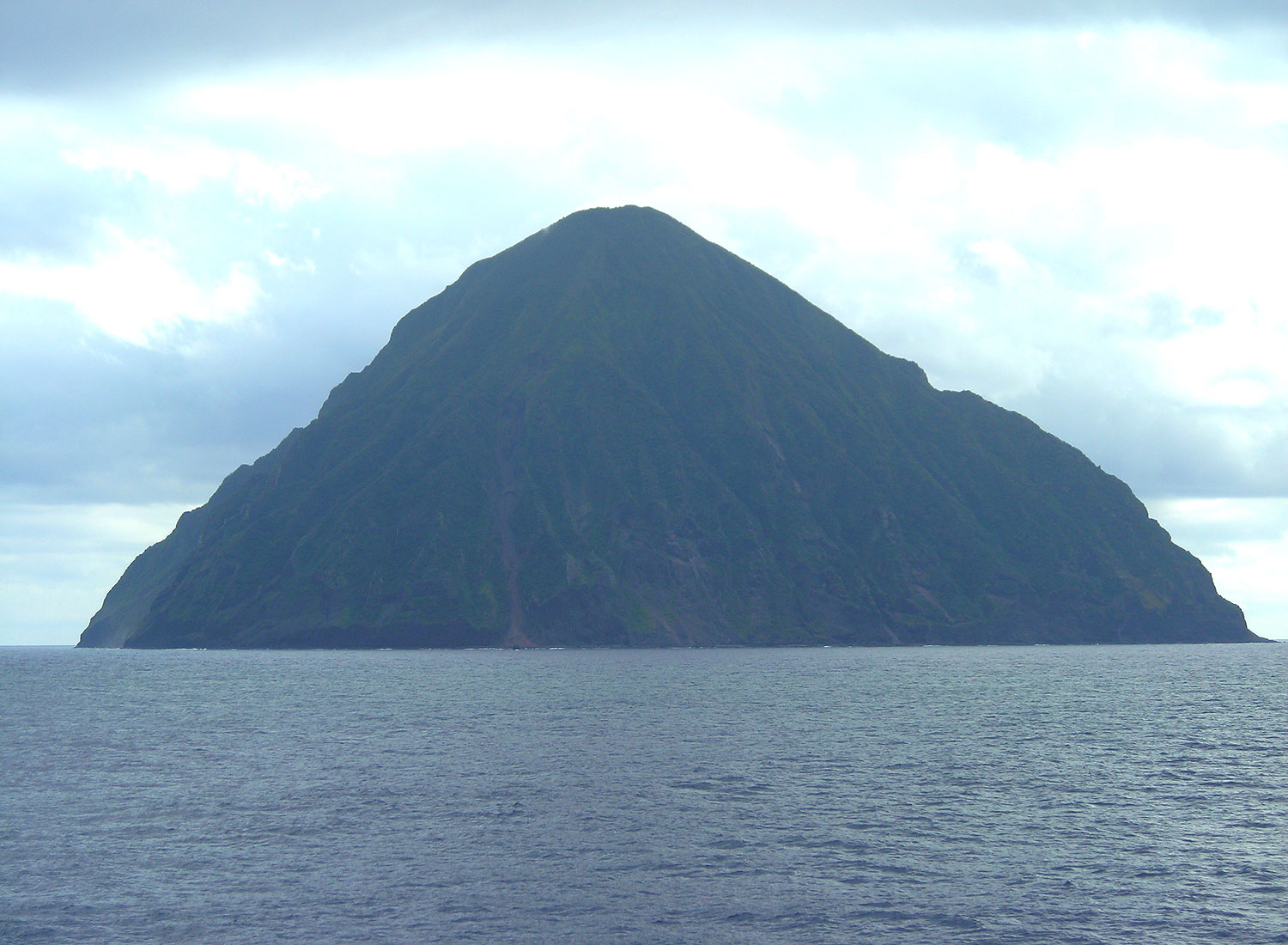
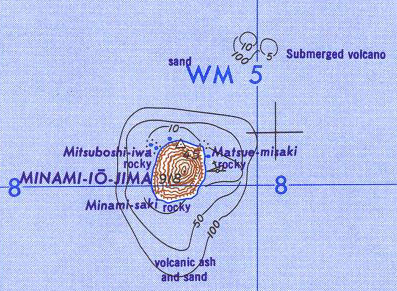
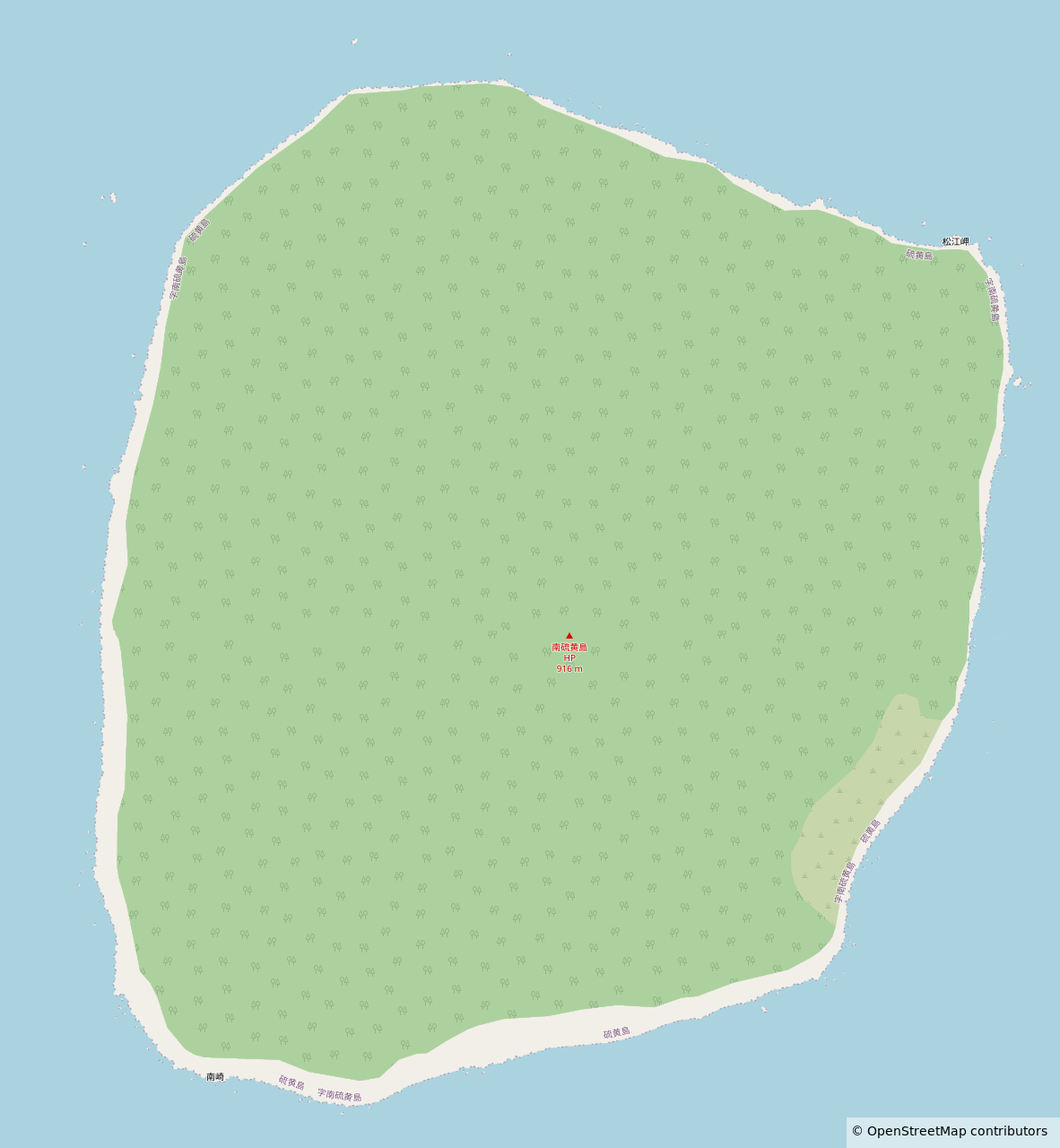
Minami Iwo Jima
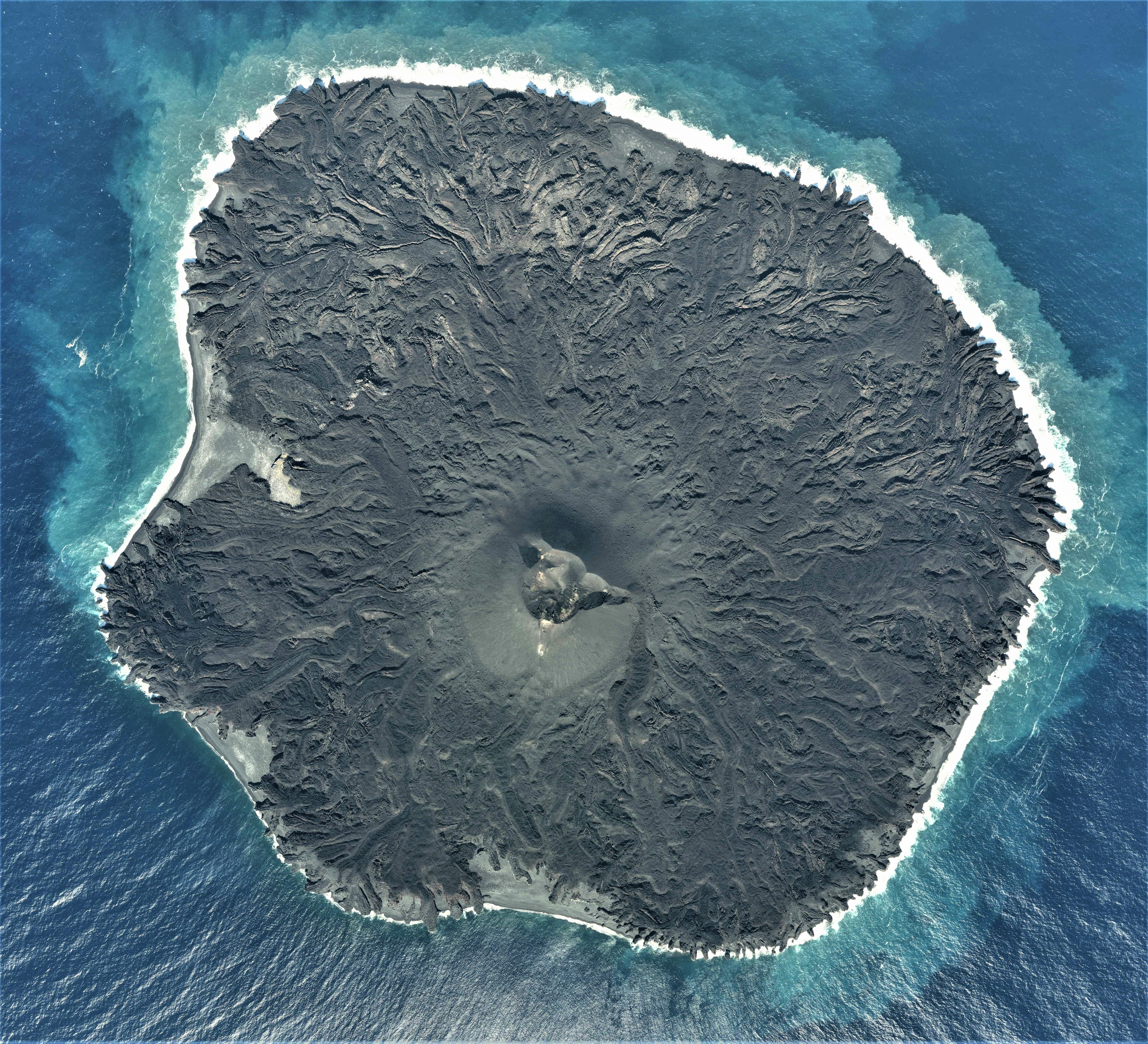
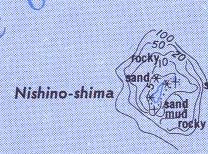
Nishinoshima

The Volcano Islands (火山列島, Kazan Rettō), also known as Iwo Islands (硫黄列島, Iō Rettō) are a group of three Japanese islands in the Northwestern Pacific Ocean. They lie southwest of the Ogasawara Islands and are administered as part of them. The islands are all active volcanoes lying atop the Izu–Bonin–Mariana Arc that stretches south to the Marianas. They have an area of 32.55 square kilometres (12.57 mi^{2}), and a population of 380. The island of Iwo Jima in the Volcano Islands lies about 1,240 kilometres (670 nmi; 771 mi) southeast of Miyazaki.

== Geography ==
The Volcano Islands are:

- Kita Iwo Jima (北硫黄島, Kita-Iō-jima / Kita-Iō-tō; literally North Sulfur Island), 5.57 square kilometres (2.15 mi^{2}), 792 metres (2,598 ft) (Sakaki-ga-mine)
- Iwo Jima (硫黄島, Iō-jima / Iō-tō; literally Sulfur Island), 20.60 square kilometres (7.95 mi^{2}), 166 metres (545 ft) (Suribachi-yama)
- Minami Iwo Jima (南硫黄島, Minami-Iō-jima / Minami-Iō-tō; literally South Sulfur Island) 3.54 square kilometres (1.37 mi^{2}), 916 metres (3,005 ft)

Farther north but in the same volcanic arc is:

- Nishino-shima (西之島; literally Western Island), 4.10 square kilometres (1.58 mi^{2}), 200 metres (660 ft)

There is a Japan Self-Defense Forces air base on Iwo Jima with a staff of 380. It is located in the village of Minami. Other than that, the islands are uninhabited.

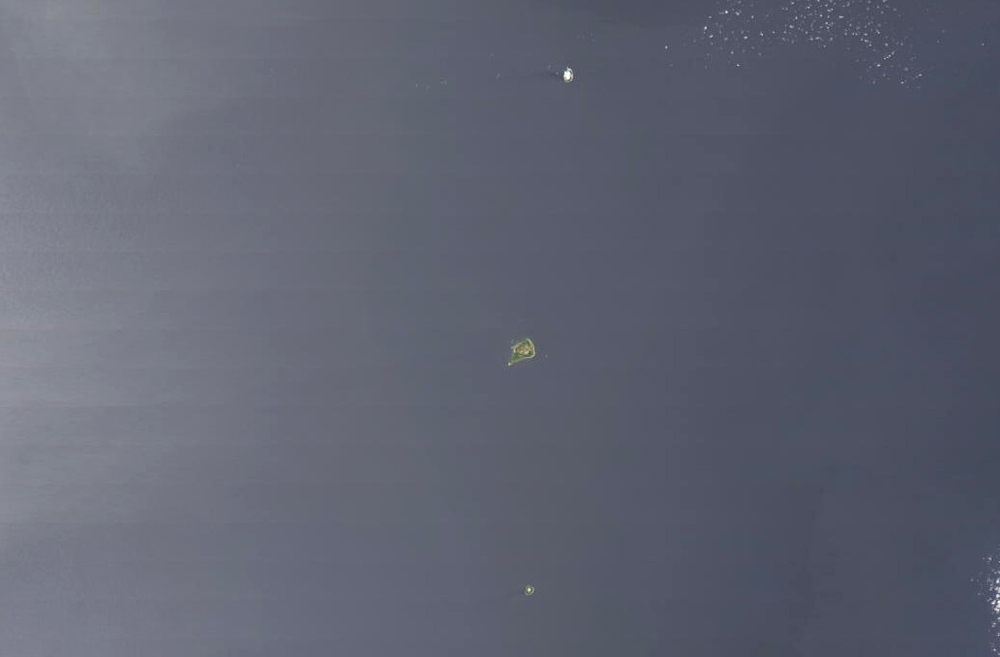
Satellite photo of the Volcano Islands (2004)
- Fukutoku-Okanoba Generally, submerged volcano eruptions sometimes bring it above the surface.

== History ==
The first recorded sighting by Europeans was in October 1543 by Spanish navigator Bernardo de la Torre on board of carrack San Juan de Letrán when trying to return from Sarangani to New Spain. Iwo Jima was charted as Sufre, the old Spanish term for sulphur.

The islands were uninhabited in 1889 when Japanese settlers settled the two northern islands from the Izu Islands. They were annexed by Japan in 1891. However, archeological evidence has revealed that islands of the greater Bonin archipelago were prehistorically inhabited by an unknown Micronesian people.

The population was about 1,100 in 1939, distributed among five settlements: Higashi, Minami, Nishi, Kita, and Motoyama (meaning "East", "South", "West", "North", and "Mountain of Origin", or central mountain) on Iwo Jima; and two settlements on Kita Iwo Jima: Ishino-mura ("Ishino village"; Ishino is a surname) and Nishi-mura ("West village"). The municipal administration office was located in Higashi until 1940 when the municipality was integrated into the administration of Ogasawara, Tokyo.

Iwo Jima was the site of the Battle of Iwo Jima in World War II, and the island group came under the United States administration. The Volcano Islands were returned to Japanese rule in 1968.

== Ecology ==
The Volcano Islands have a subtropical climate. They are part of the Ogasawara subtropical moist forests ecoregion and are home to unique and diverse plants and animals, including many endemic species. They have been recognised as forming an Important Bird Area (IBA) by BirdLife International because they support populations of red-tailed tropicbirds, Japanese wood pigeons and Matsudaira's storm petrels.

== See also ==
- Nanpō Islands
- Geography of Japan
