= Battle of Iwo Jima order of battle =

Order of battle for World War II battle

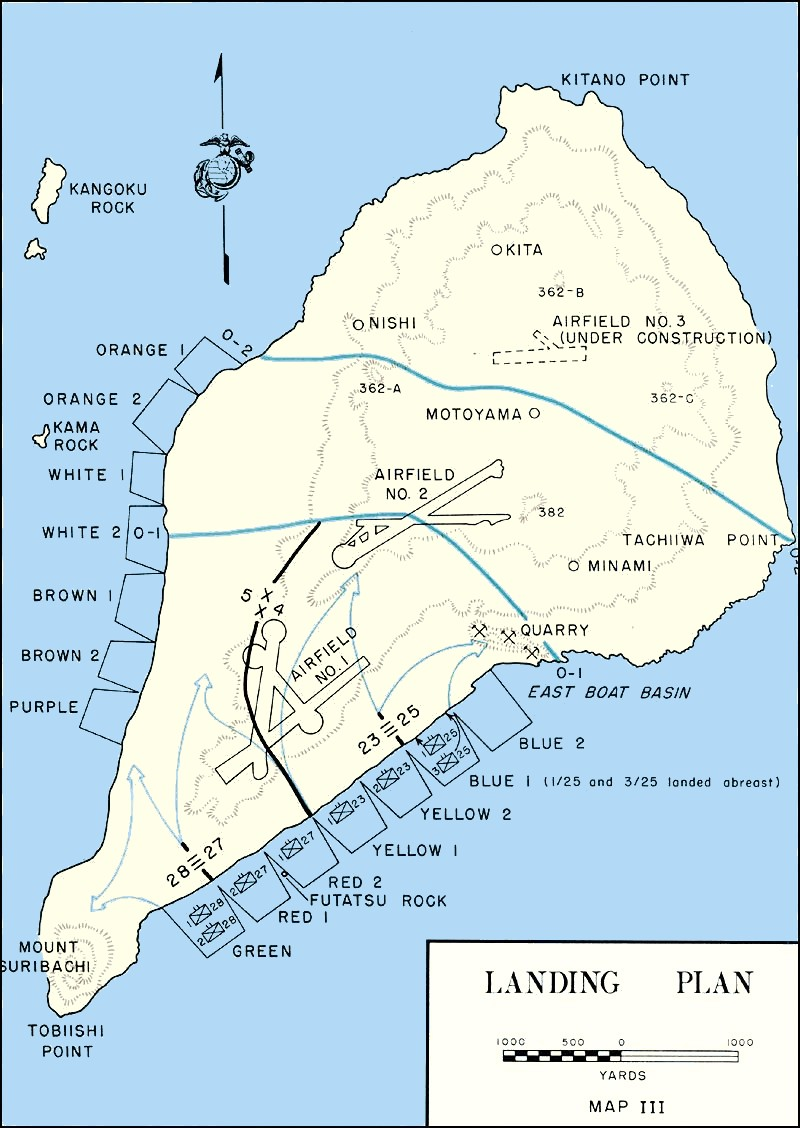
Map of Iwo Jima showing landing beaches

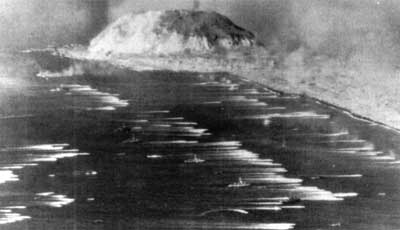
Landing craft approaching Iwo Jima; looking southwest toward Mt. Suribachi

On February 19, 1945, men of the United States Marine Corps invaded the island of Iwo Jima, part of the Volcano Islands chain, in the North Pacific. This invasion, known as Operation Detachment, was a phase of the Pacific Theatre of World War II. The American goal was to establish multiple airfields that would allow escort fighters to accompany long-range bombers in their attacks on the Japanese home islands, as well as providing a place for damaged bombers to land on the return flight.

The Japanese military was determined to inflict a casualty rate so high that the U.S. government would give up its demand that Japan surrender unconditionally. To this end, the island had been covered with an extremely extensive system of fortifications and fields of fire. The United States Navy subjected the island to an unprecedented bombardment and, according to historian Samuel Eliot Morison, "In no previous operation in the Pacific had naval gunfire support been so effective as at Iwo Jima." Nonetheless, Japanese artillery and machine-gun fire were extremely effective because the underground bunkers were so strong, only a direct hit by a bomb or naval shell could knock one out. Since direct hits were very difficult on well-camouflaged bunkers, many survived and inflicted a huge casualty rate on the Marines.

For the conquest of Iwo Jima, the Marine Corps assigned three divisions, a total of almost 70,000 troops, in stark contrast to the single division tasked with capturing Guadalcanal in August 1942. The conquest of Iwo Jima took five weeks, far beyond the American estimates.

== United States ==
Naval commanders for Operation Detachment

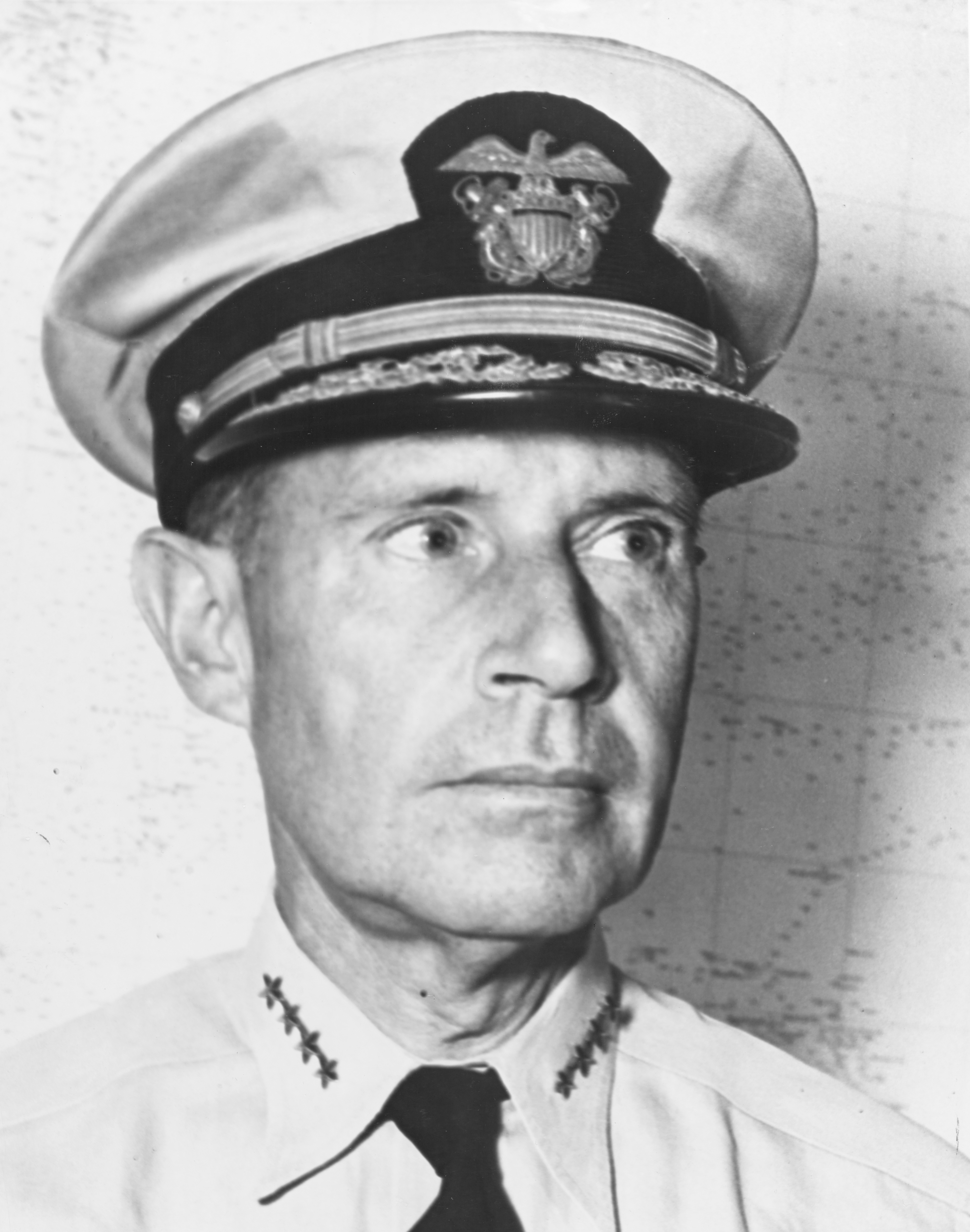
Admiral Raymond A. Spruance

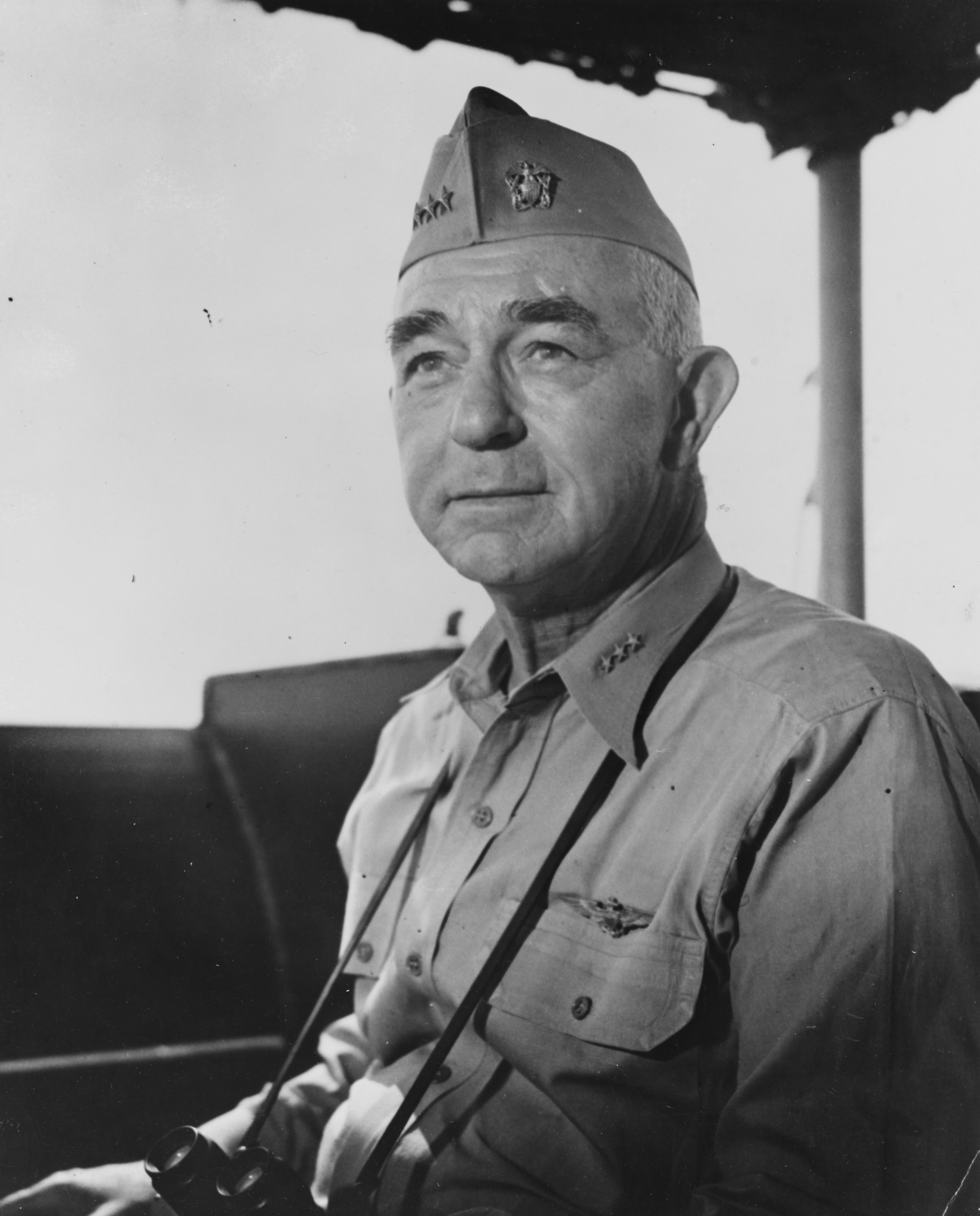
Vice Adm. Richmond Kelly Turner

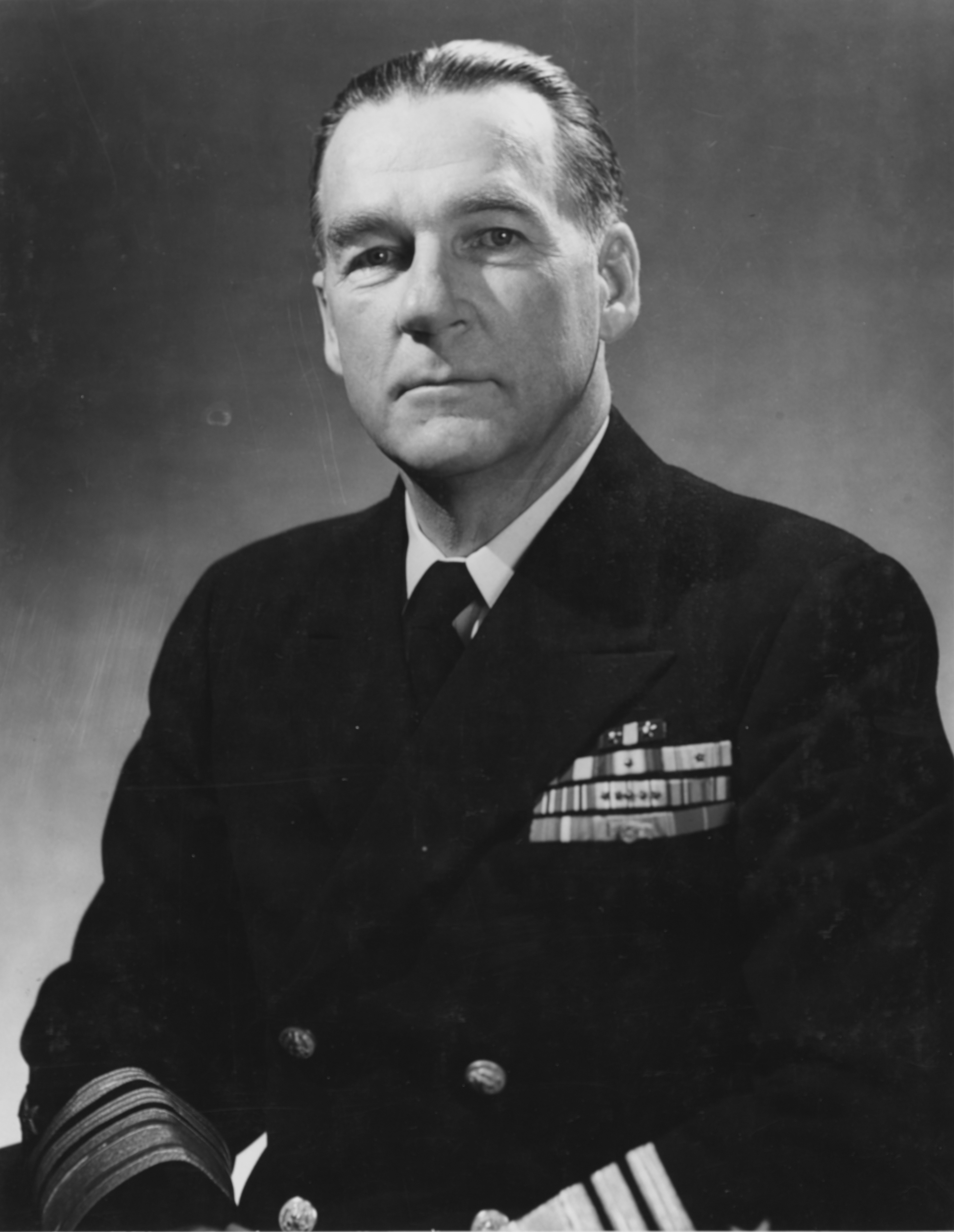
Rear Adm. William H.P. Blandy

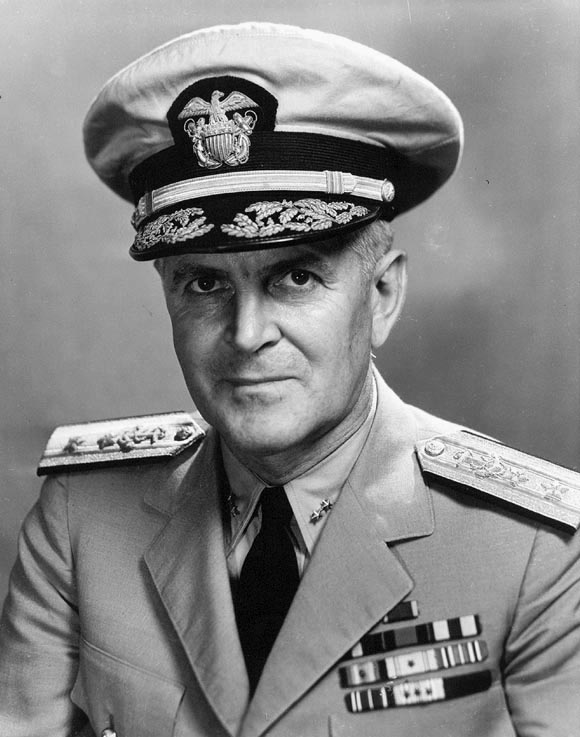
Rear Adm. Harry W. Hill

=== Naval forces ===
United States Pacific Fleet
Admiral Chester W. Nimitz HQ at Pearl Harbor

United States Fifth Fleet
Admiral Raymond A. Spruance in heavy cruiser Indianapolis

Joint Expeditionary Force (Task Force 51)

Vice Admiral Richmond Kelly Turner in amphibious command ship Eldorado

Amphibious Support Force (Task Force 52)

Rear Admiral William H.P. Blandy in amphibious command ship Estes

Attack Force (Task Force 53)

Rear Admiral Harry W. Hill in amphibious command ship Auburn

Fast Carrier Task Force (Task Force 58)

Rear Admiral Marc Mitscher in aircraft carrier Lexington

=== Ground forces ===
Ground force commanders

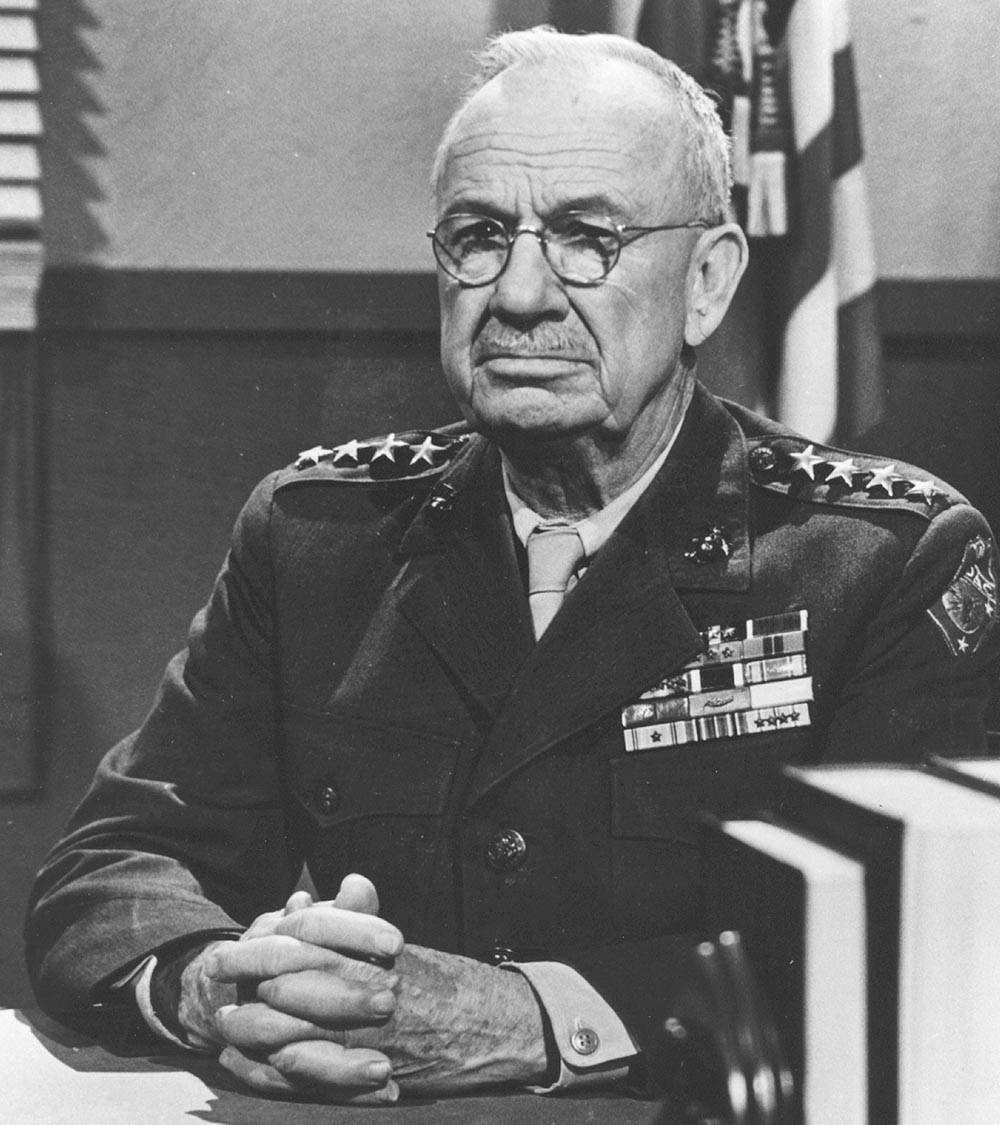
Holland M. Smith as a full general

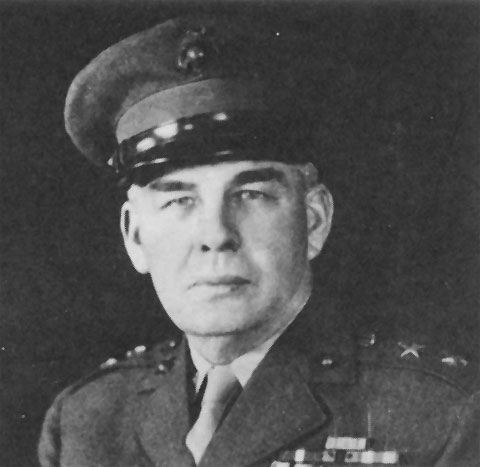
Maj. Gen. Harry Schmidt

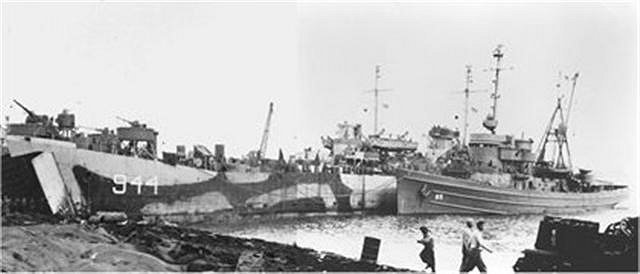
LST-944 on Yellow Beach, Iwo Jima with fleet tug Zuni alongside

- Expeditionary Troops (Task Force 56)
- Lieutenant General Holland Smith
  - Chief of Staff: Col. Dudley S. Brown
  - Personnel officer (G-1): Col. Russell N. Jordahl
  - Intelligence officer (G-2): Col. Edmond J. Buckley
  - Operations officer (G-3): Col. Kenneth H. Weir
  - Logistics officer (G-4): Col. George R. Rowan

==== V Amphibious Corps ====
- V Amphibious Corps (VAC)
- Major General Harry Schmidt
  - Chief of Staff: Brig. Gen. William W. Rogers
  - Personnel officer (G-1): Col. David A. Stafford
  - Intelligence officer (G-2): Col. Thomas R. Yancey
  - Operations officer (G-3): Col. Edward A. Craig
  - Logistics officer (G-4): Col. William F. Brown

Support units

- Corps Troops VAC
- Col. Alton A. Gladden
  - Headquarters and Service Battalion VAC (Capt. Cyril M. Milbrath)
  - Provisional Signal Group (Lt. Col. Harry W. G. Vadnais)
    - Landing Force Headquarters Signal Section
    - VAC Signal Battalion (Lt.Col. Alfred F. Robertshaw)
    - Shore Party Communication Unit
    - Detachment, Signal Company, 8th Field Depot
    - Detachment, 1st Separate Reconnaissance and Intelligence Platoon
    - Detachment, Signal Headquarters Company, VII Fighter Command (US Army)
    - Detachment, 568th Signal Air Warning Battalion (US Army)
    - Detachment, 726th Signal Air Warning Company (US Army)
    - Detachment, 49th Signal Construction Battalion (US Army)
    - Detachment 44, 70th Army Airways Communications System (US Army)
    - Detachment, Communications Unit 434
  - 1st Provisional Field Artillery Group (Col. John S. Letcher)
    - Headquarters Battery
    - 2nd 155mm Howitzer Battalion (Maj. Earl J. Rowse)
    - 4th 155mm Howitzer Battalion (Lt. Col. Douglas E. Reeve)
    - 473rd Amphibian Truck Company(US Army)
  - 138th Anti-Aircraft Group (US Army; Col. Clarence E. Rothgeb)
    - Headquarters Battery
    - 506th Anti-Aircraft Gun Battalion (Lt.Col. D. M. White)
    - 483rd Anti-Aircraft Automatic Weapons Battalion (Lt. Col. A. Roth)
  - HQ, Provisional LVT Group (Maj. Henry G. Lawrence, Jr.)
  - 2nd Separate Engineer Battalion (Lt. Col. Charles O. Clark)
  - 2nd Armored Amphibian Battalion (Lt. Col. Reed M. Fawell, Jr.)
  - 23rd Naval Construction Battalion (Companies A and B) (US Navy; Cmdr. H. W. Heuer)
  - 62nd Naval Construction Battalion (US Navy Reserve; Lt. Cmdr. F. B. Campbell)
  - VAC Medical Battalion (Lt. Cmdr. William B. Clapp)
  - Corps Evacuation Hospital Number 1 (US Navy; Capt. H. G. Young)
  - 38th Field Hospital, Reinforced (US Army; Maj. Samuel S. Kirkland)
  - 8th Field Depot (plus VAC Shore Party Headquarters) (Col. Leland S. Swindler)
  - Landing Force Air Support Control Unit (Col. Vernon E. Megee)
  - Company B, Amphibious Reconnaissance Battalion
  - VAC Motor Transport Company
  - 2nd Bomb Disposal Company (plus 156th Bomb Disposal Squad)
  - Medical Section, Civila Affairs
  - Joint Intelligence Center Pacific Ocean Areas Intelligence Team
  - Joint Intelligence Center Pacific Ocean Areas Enemy Materiel and Salvage Platoon

===== 5th Marine Division =====
5th Marine Division command

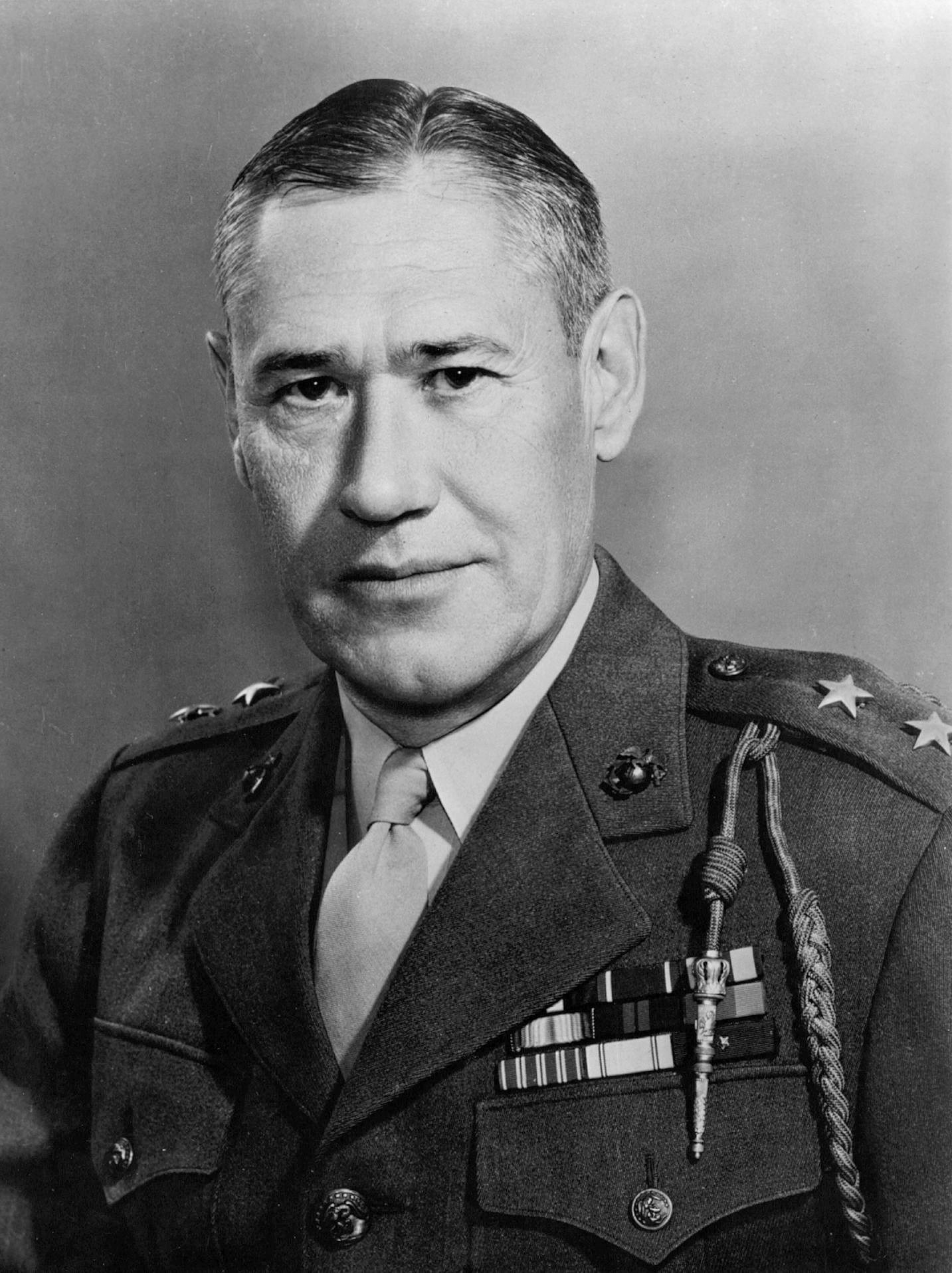
Maj. Gen. Keller E. Rockey

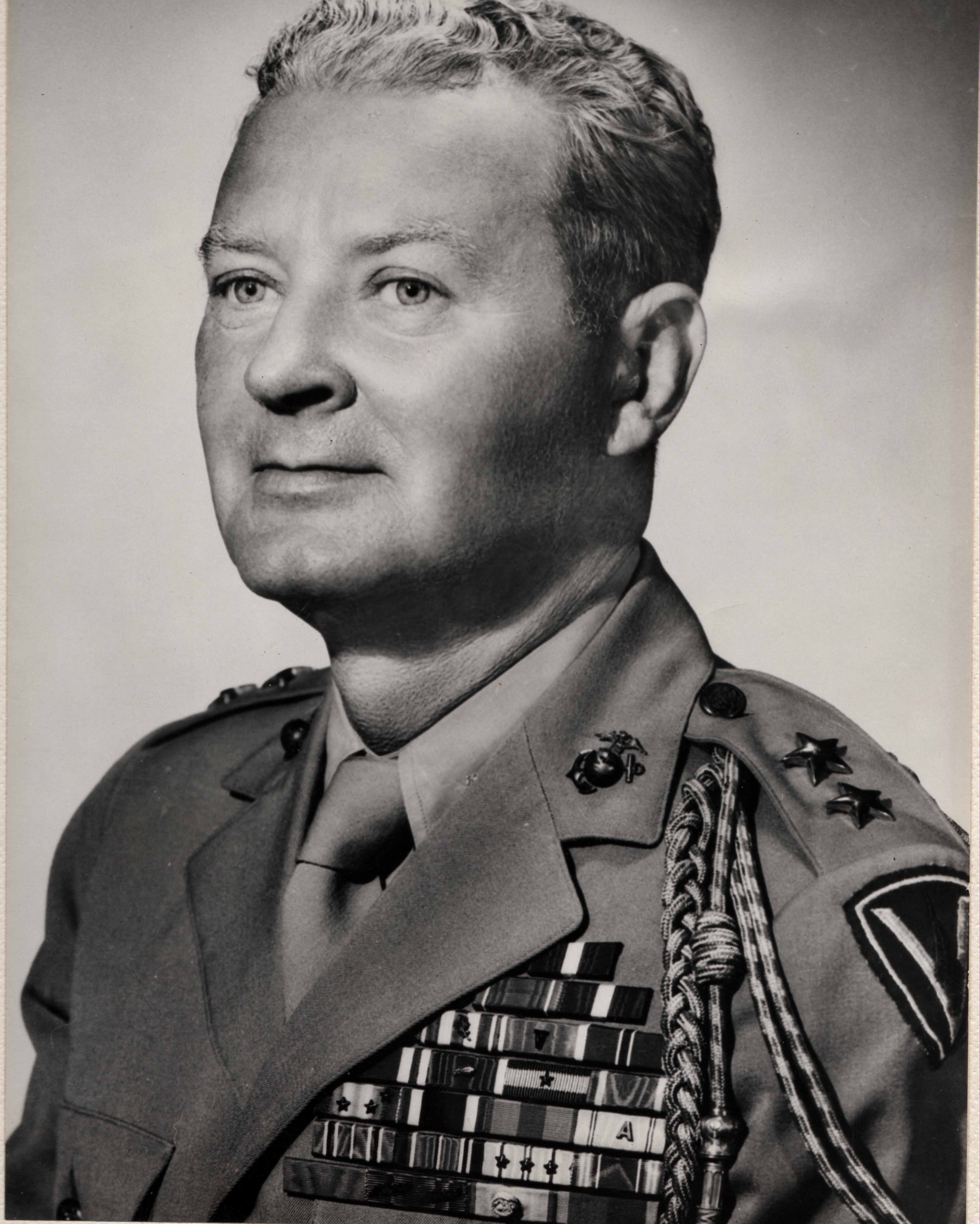
Leo D. Hermle as a major general

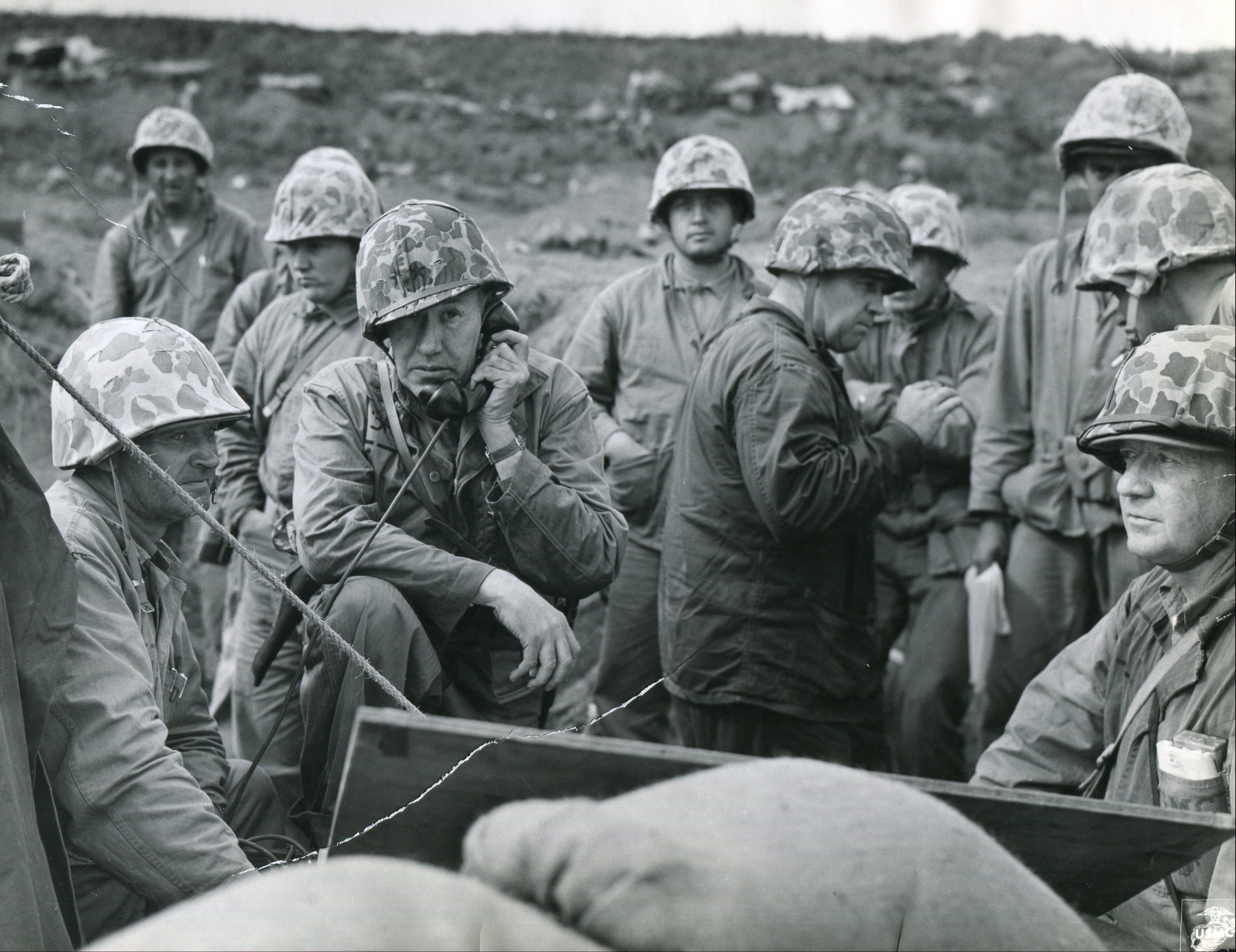
5th Marine Division command post on Iwo Jima; at left is Asst. Div. Cmdr. Leo D. Hermle with Div. Cmdr. Keller E. Rockey holding a field telephone

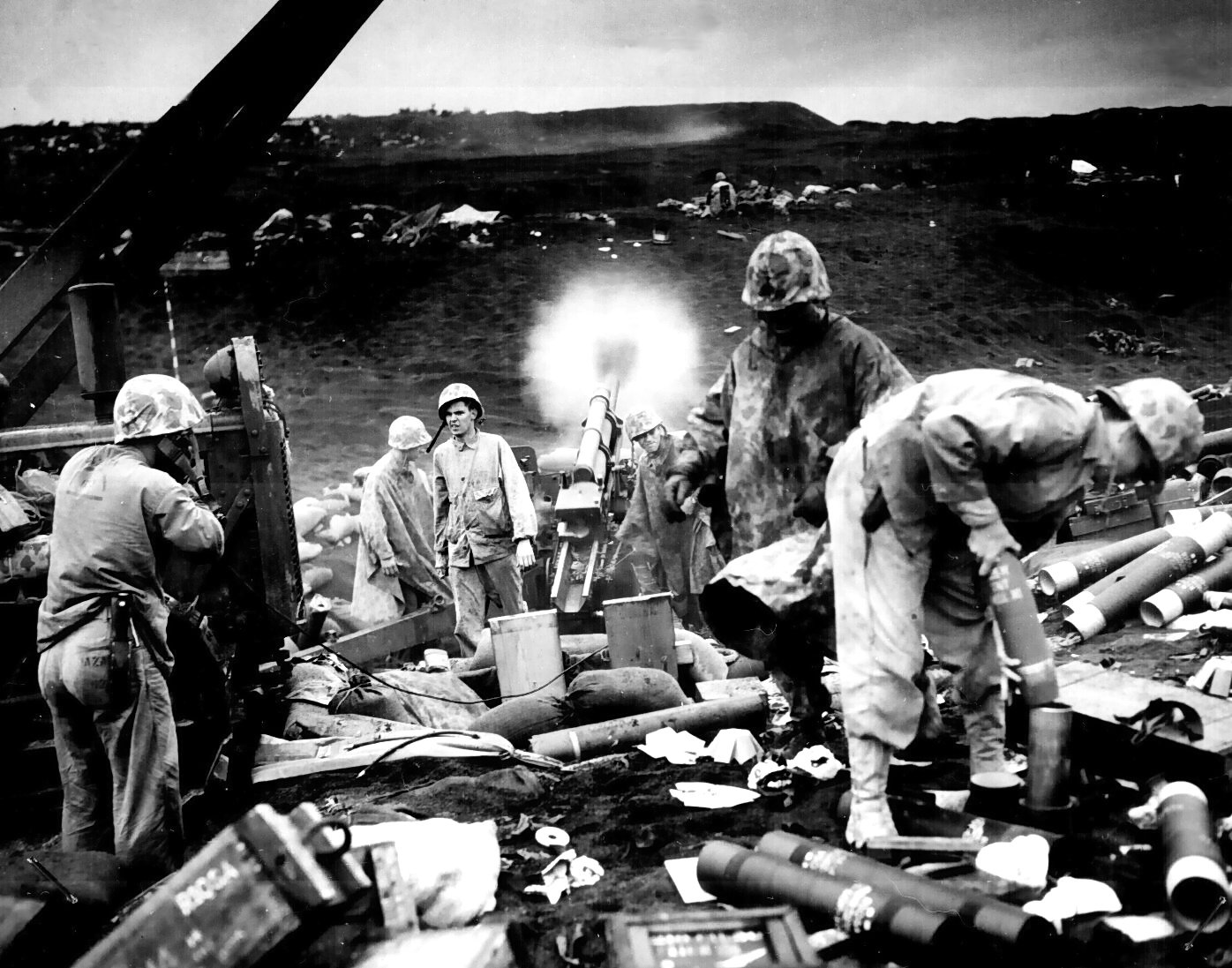
A Marine Corps howitzer at the moment of firing

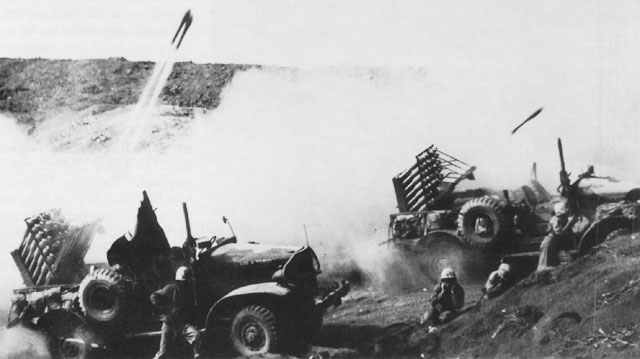
Jeeps firing 4.5-inch rockets at Japanese positions

Left landing area (Green and Red Beaches):

- 5th Marine Division (25,884 officers and enlisted)
- Major General Keller E. Rockey
  - Assistant Division Commander: Brig. Gen. Leo D. Hermle
  - Chief of Staff: Col. Ray A. Robinson
  - Personnel officer (D-1): Col. John W. Beckett
  - Intelligence officer (D-2): Lt. Col. George A. Roll
  - Operations officer (D-3): Col. James F. Shaw, Jr.
  - Logistics officer (D-4): Col. Earl S. Piper
  - Plans officer (D-5): Lt. Col. Frederick H. Dowsett
- Green Beach:
  - 28th Marine Regiment
  - Colonel Harry B. "Harry the Horse" Liversedge
  - Executive Officer: Lt. Col. Robert H. Williams
    - 1st Battalion (Lt. Col. Jackson B. Butterfield)
      - CMoH recipients: Cpl. Tony Stein (KIA 19 Feb), Sgt. William G. Harrell
    - 2nd Battalion (Lt. Col. Chandler W. Johnson (KIA 2 Mar), Maj. Thomas B. Pearce, Jr.)
      - CMoH recipients: PFC Donald J. Ruhl (KIA 21 Feb), Pvt. George Phillips (KIA 14 Mar)
    - 3rd Battalion (Lt. Col. Charles E. Shepard, Jr. (to 14 Mar), Maj. Tolson A. Smoak (to 25 Mar), Lt. Col. Shepard)
      - CMoH recipient: Navy Corpsman Jack Williams (KIA 3 Mar)
- Red Beaches 1 & 2:
  - 27th Marine Regiment
  - Colonel Thomas A. Wornham
  - Executive Officer: Col. Louis C. Plain (WIA 19 Feb), Lt. Col. James P. Berkeley)
    - 1st Battalion (Lt. Col. John A. Butler (KIA 5 Mar), Lt. Col. Justin C. Duryea (WIA 9 Mar), Lt. Col. William H. Tumbleston (WIA 14 Mar)
      - CMoH recipient: Sgt. Joseph R. Julian (KIA 9 Mar)
    - 2nd Battalion (Maj. John W. Antonelli (WIA 9 Mar), Maj. Gerald F. Russell)
      - CMoH recipient: Lt. Jack Lummus (KIA 8 Mar)
    - 3rd Battalion (Lt. Col. Donn J. Robertson) (Note: Commanded the 1st Marine Division in the Vietnam War.)
      - CMoH recipients: Sgt. William G. Walsh (KIA 27 Feb), Navy Corpsman John H. Willis (KIA 28 Feb)
- Reserve:
  - 26th Marine Regiment
  - Colonel Chester B. Graham
  - Executive Officer: Col. Lester S. Hamel
    - 1st Battalion (Lt. Col. Daniel C. Pollock (WIA 19 Mar), Maj. Albert V.K. Gary)
      - CMoH recipients: Cpl. Charles J. Berry (KIA 3 Mar), Capt. Robert Hugo Dunlap, PFC Jacklyn Harrell Lucas
    - 2nd Battalion (Lt. Col. Joseph P. Sayers (WIA 23 Feb), Maj. Amadeo Rea)
      - CMoH recipients: Pvt. Franklin E. Sigler, Navy Corpsman George E. Wahlen
    - 3rd Battalion (Lt. Col. Tom M. Trotti (KIA 22 Feb), Maj. Richard Fagan)
      - CMoH recipient: PFC William R. Caddy (KIA 3 Mar)
- Artillery
  - 13th Marine Regiment (Artillery)
  - Colonel James D. Waller
    - 1st Battalion (Lt. Col. John S. Oldfield)
    - 2nd Battalion (Maj. Carl W. Hjerpe)
    - 3rd Battalion (Lt. Col. Henry T. Waller)
    - 4th Battalion (Maj. James F. Coady)
- Service Troops
- Colonel Benjamin W. Gaily
  - Headquarters Battalion (Maj. John Ayrault, Jr.)
  - 5th Tank Battalion (Lt. Col. William R. Collins)
  - 5th Engineer Battalion (Lt. Col. Clifford H. Shuey)
  - 5th Pioneer Battalion (Maj. Robert S. Riddell)
  - 5th Service Battalion (Maj. Francis P. Daly (KIA 22 Feb), Maj. Gardelle Lewis (from 26 Feb))
  - 5th Motor Transport Battalion (Maj. Arthur F. Torgler, Jr.)
  - 5th Medical Battalion (Lt. Cmdr. William W. Ayres, USN)
  - Division Reconnaissance Company
- Attached units
  - Companies C and D, plus Detachment, Battalion Headquarters, 2nd Armored Amphibian Battalion
  - 3rd Amphibian Tractor Battalion (Lt. Col. Sylvester L. Stephan)
  - 11th Amphibian Tractor Battalion (Lt. Col. Albert J. Roose)
    - CMoH recipient: Lt. Harry L. Martin (KIA 26 Mar)
  - 31st Naval Construction Battalion (US Navy Reserve; Lt. Cmdr. D. J. Ermilio)
  - 5th Joint Assault Signal Company
  - 5th Marine Amphibian Truck Company
  - 471st Amphibian Truck Company (US Army)
  - 3d Provisional Rocket Detachment
  - Marine Observation Squadron 5
  - 6th War Dog Platoon
  - Detachment, 8th Field Depot
  - Detachment, 726th Signal Air Warning Company (US Army)
  - Detachment, VAC Signal Battalion
  - 592nd Port Company (US Army)
  - Joint Intelligence Center Pacific Ocean Areas Intelligence Team
  - 27th Replacement Draft
  - 31st Replacement Draft

===== 4th Marine Division =====
4th Marine Division command

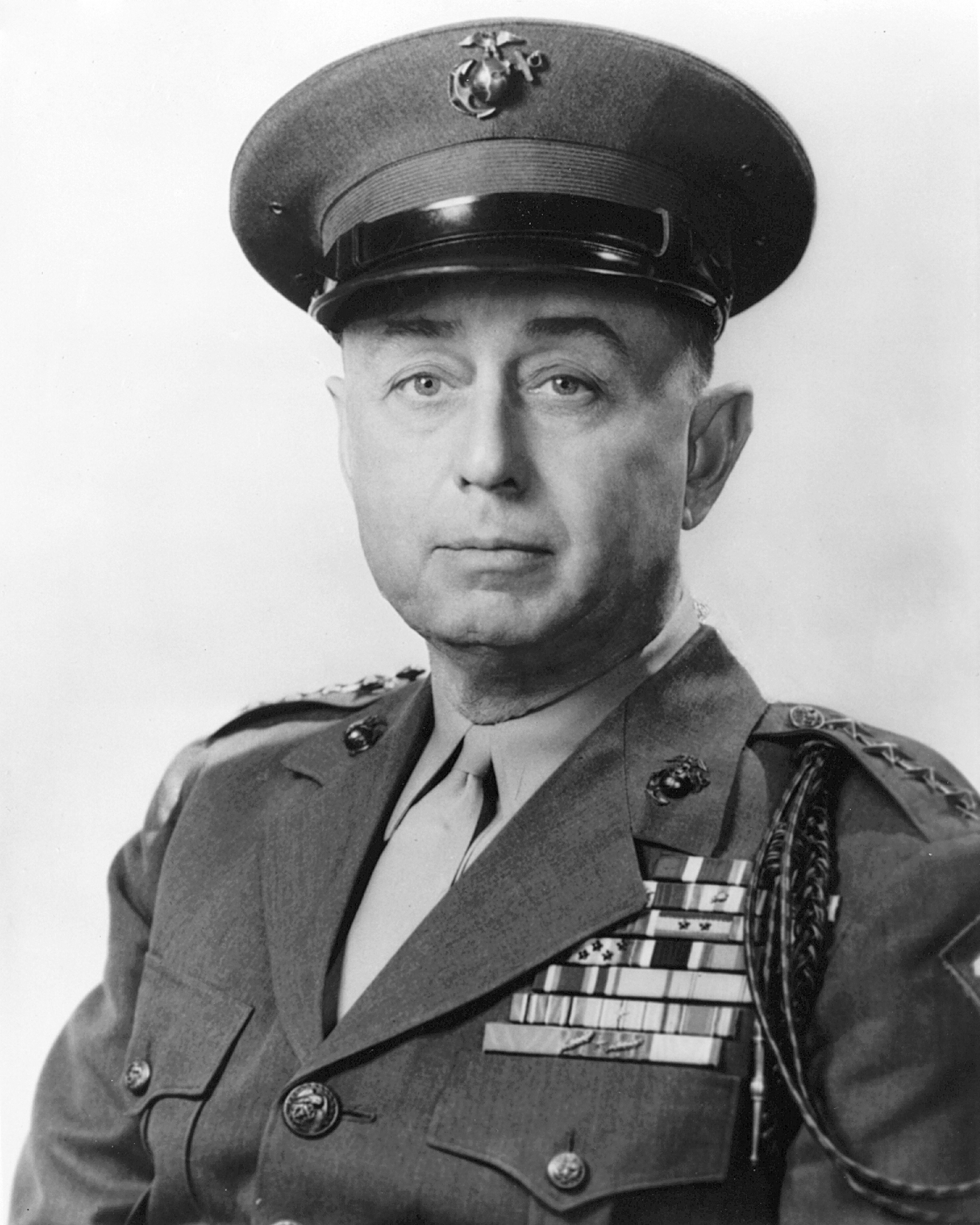
Clifton B. Cates as a full general

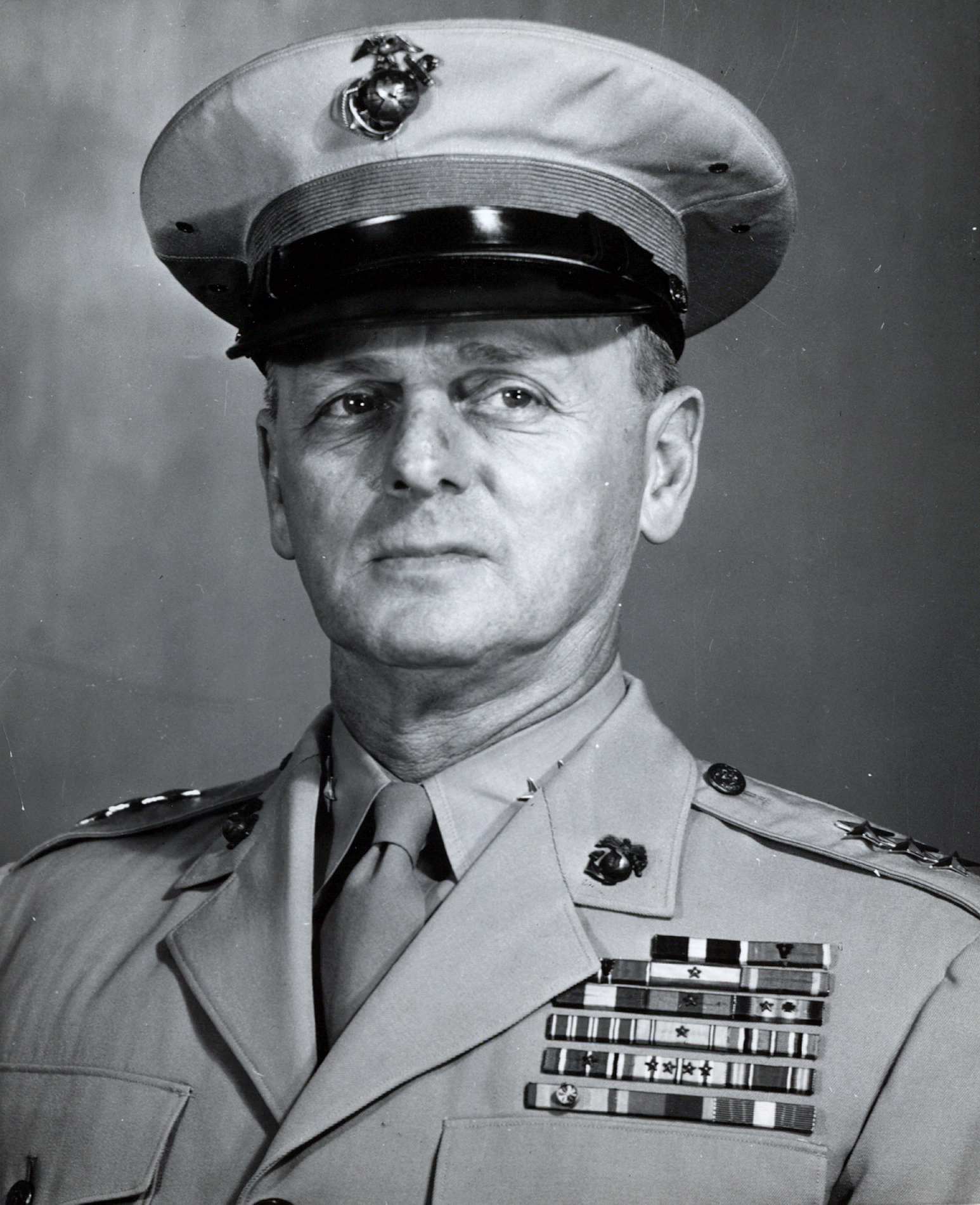
Franklin A. Hart as a lieutenant general

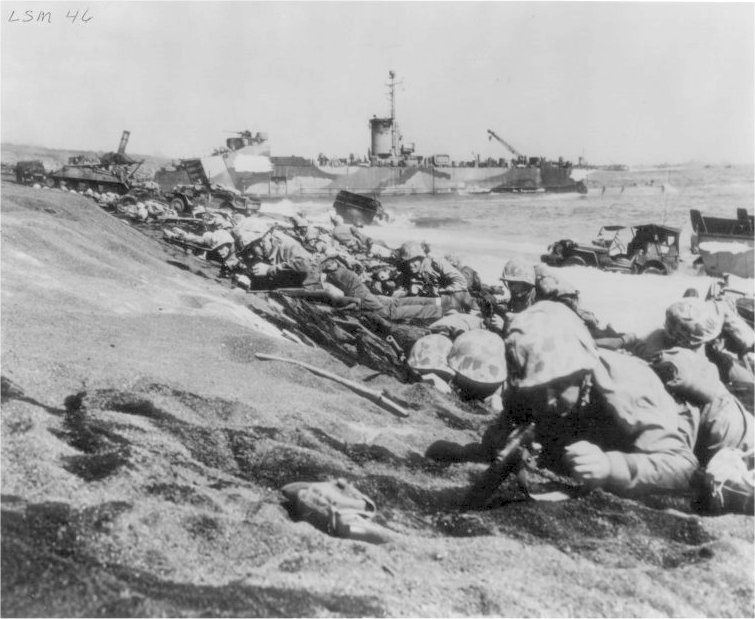
Men of the 4th Marine Division pinned down on the beach at Iwo Jima; LSM-46 is visible in the background

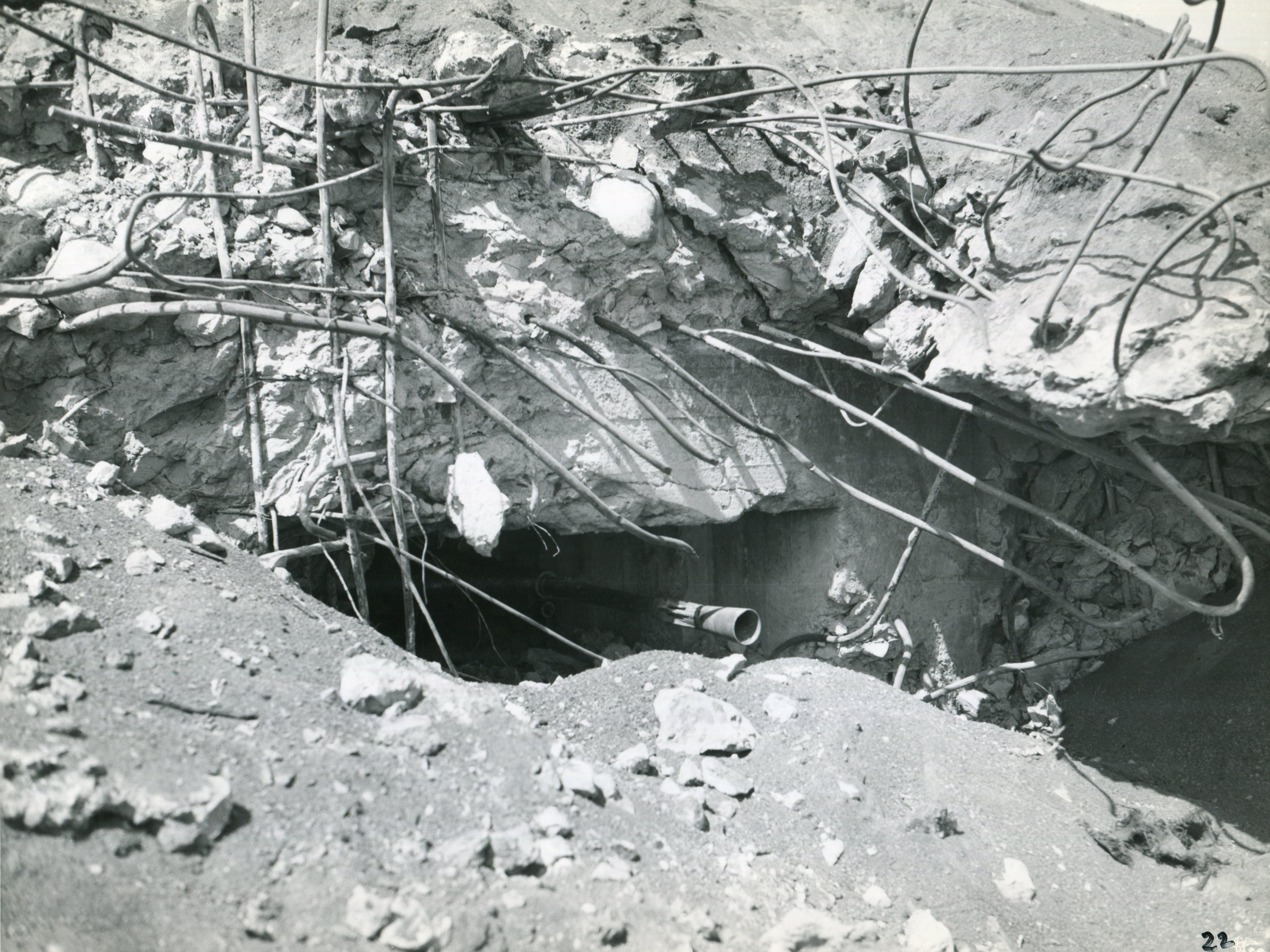
Japanese gun emplacement lightly damaged by bombardment; Marines still had to enter the enclosure and kill the troops inside.

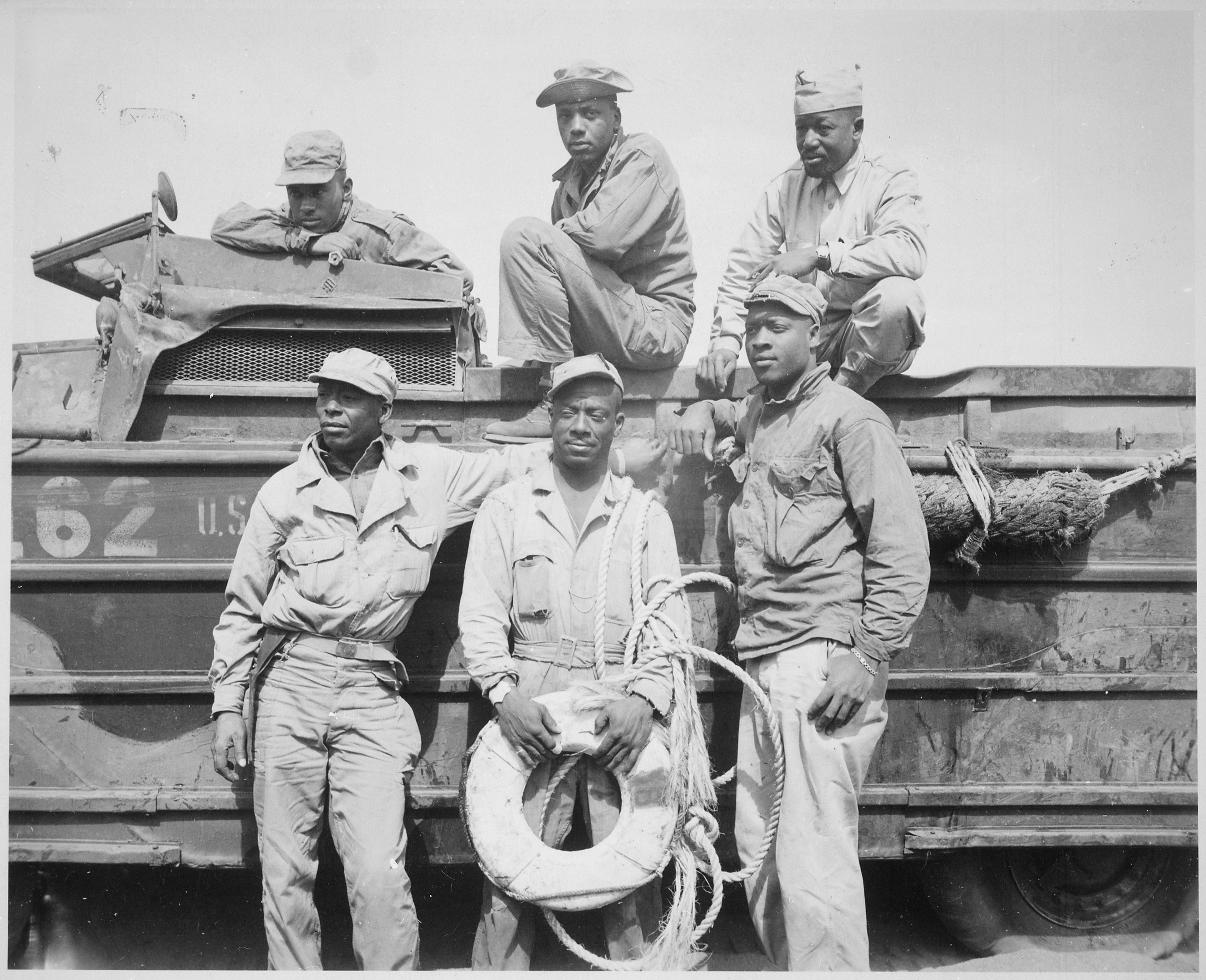
Black Marines with DUKW at Iwo Jima

Right landing area (Yellow and Blue beaches):

- 4th Marine Division (24,452 officers and enlisted)
- Major General Clifton B. Cates (Note: Served as Commandant of the Marine Corps from 1948 to 1951.)
  - Assistant Division Commander: Brig. Gen. Franklin A. Hart
  - Chief of Staff: Col. Merton J. Batchelder
  - Personnel officer (D-1): Col. Orin H. Wheeler
  - Intelligence officer (D-2): Lt. Col. Gooderham L. McCormick
  - Operations officer (D-3): Col. Edwin A. Pollock
  - Logistics officer (D-4): Col. Matthew C. Horner
- Yellow Beaches 1 & 2:
  - 23rd Marine Regiment
  - Colonel Walter W. Wensinger
  - Executive Officer: Lt. Col. Edward J. Dillon
    - 1st Battalion (Lt. Col. Ralph Haas (KIA 20 Feb), Lt. Col. Louis B. Blissard)
      - CMoH recipient: Sgt. Darrell S. Cole (KIA 19 Feb)
    - 2nd Battalion (Maj. Robert H. Davidson)
      - CMoH recipient: PFC Douglas T. Jacobson
    - 3rd Battalion (Maj. James S. Scales)
      - CMoH recipient: Lt. Col. Justice M. Chambers
- Blue Beach 1:
  - 25th Marine Regiment
  - Colonel John R. Lanigan
  - Executive Officer: Lt. Col. Clarence J. O'Donnell
    - 1st Battalion (Lt. Col. Hollis U. Mustain (KIA 21 Feb), Maj. Fenton J. Mee)
      - CMoH recipient: Sgt. Ross F. Gray (KIA 21 Feb)
    - 2nd Battalion (Lt. Col. Lewis C. Hudson, Jr. (WIA 20 Feb), Lt. Col. James Taul)
    - 3rd Battalion (Lt. Col. Justice M. Chambers (WIA 22 Feb), Capt. James C. Headley)
- Reserve:
  - 24th Marine Regiment
  - Colonel Walter I. Jordan
  - Executive Officer: Lt. Col. Austin R. Brunelli
    - 1st Battalion (Maj. Paul S. Treitel (to 8 Mar), Lt. Col. Austin R. Brunelli)
    - 2nd Battalion (Lt. Col. Richard Rothwell)
      - CMoH recipients: Capt. Joseph J. McCarthy, Navy Corpsman Francis J. Pierce
- Artillery
  - 14th Marine Regiment (Artillery)
  - Colonel Louis O. DeHaven
  - Executive Officer: Lt. Col. Randall M. Victory
    - 1st Battalion (Maj. John B. Edgar, Jr.)
    - 2nd Battalion (Maj. Clifford B. Drake)
    - 3rd Battalion (Lt. Col. Robert E. MacFarlane)
    - 4th Battalion (Lt. Col. Carl A. Youngdale)
- Service Troops
- Lt. Colonel Melvin L. Krulewitch
  - Headquarters Battalion (Col. Bertrand T. Fay)
  - 4th Engineer Battalion (Lt. Col. Nelson K. Brown)
  - 4th Medical Battalion (Cmdr. Reuben L. Sharp, USN)
  - 4th Motor Transport Battalion (Lt. Col. Ralph L. Schiesswohl)
  - 4th Pioneer Battalion (Lt. Col. Richard G. Ruby)
  - 4th Service Battalion (Lt. Col. John F. Fondahl)
  - 4th Tank Battalion (Lt. Col. Richard K. Schmidt)
  - Division Reconnaissance Company
- Attached units
  - Companies A and B, plus Detachment, Battalion Headquarters, 2nd Armored Amphibian Battalion
  - 5th Amphibian Tractor Battalion (Maj. George L. Shead)
  - 10th Amphibian Tractor Battalion (Maj. Victor J. Croizat)
  - 133rd Naval Construction Battalion (US Navy Reserve; Lt. Cmdr. R. P. Murphy)
  - 1st Joint Assault Signal Company
  - 4th Marine Amphibian Truck Company
  - 476th Amphibian Truck Company (US Army)
  - 1st Provisional Rocket Detachment
  - Marine Observation Squadron 4
  - 7th War Dog Platoon
  - Detachment, 8th Field Depot
  - Detachment, 726th Signal Air Warning Company (US Army)
  - Detachment, VAC Signal Battalion
  - 442nd Port Company (US Army)
  - Joint Intelligence Center Pacific Ocean Areas Intelligence Team
  - 24th Replacement Draft
  - 30th Replacement Draft

===== 3rd Marine Division =====
3rd Marine Division command

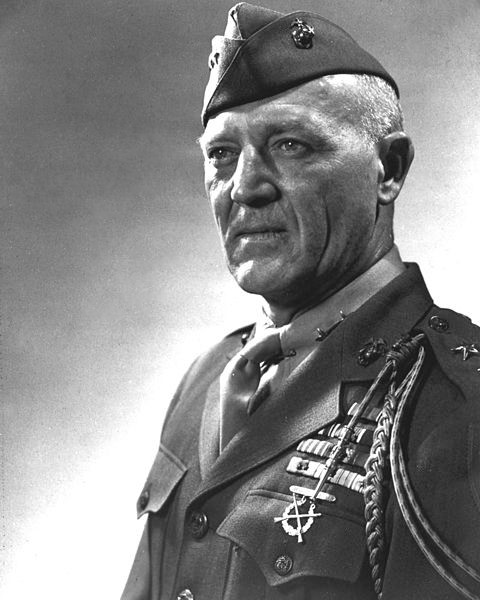
Maj. Gen. Graves B. Erskine

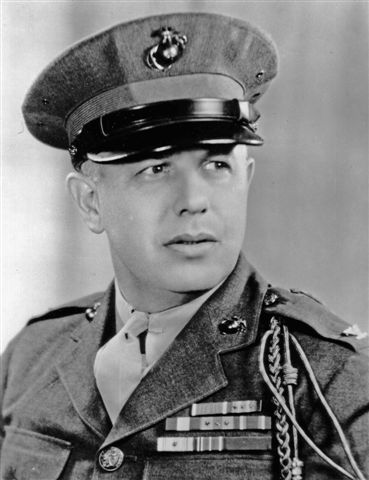
William A. Worton as a colonel

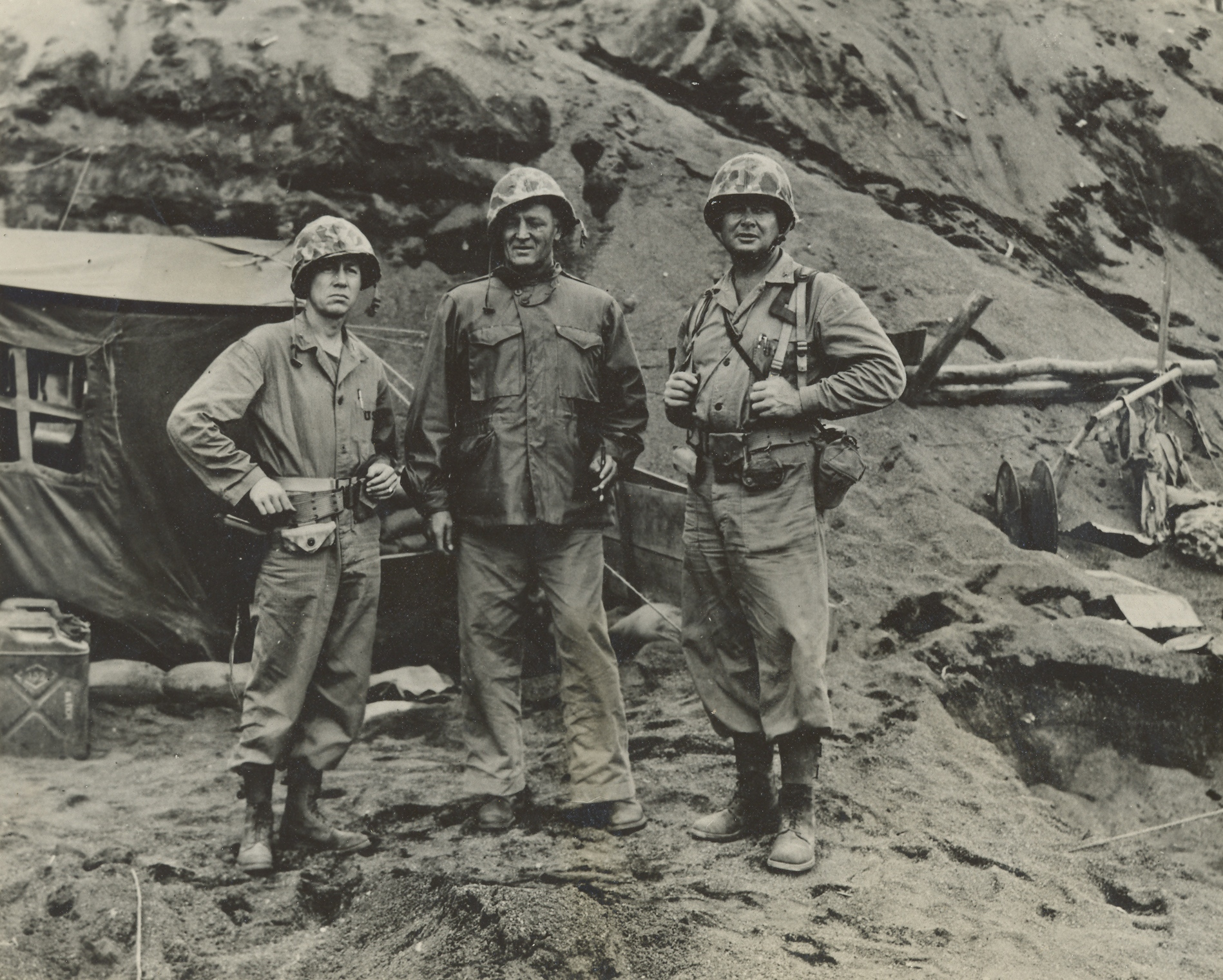
3rd Marine Division officers on Iwo Jima: (l. to r.) Col. Robert W. Hogaboom, Maj. Gen. Graves B. Erskine, Col. John B. Wilson

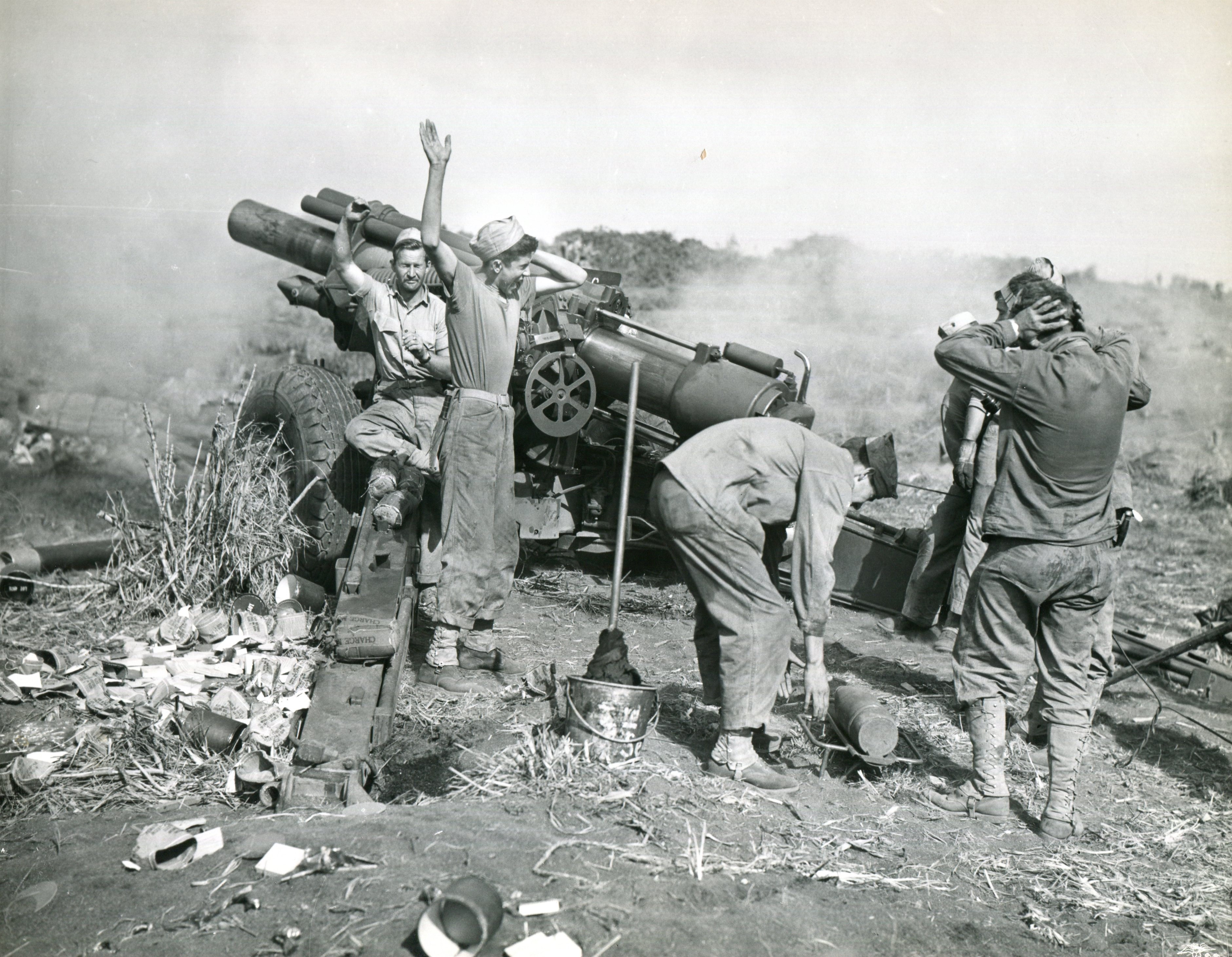
Marines firing a 155mm howitzer

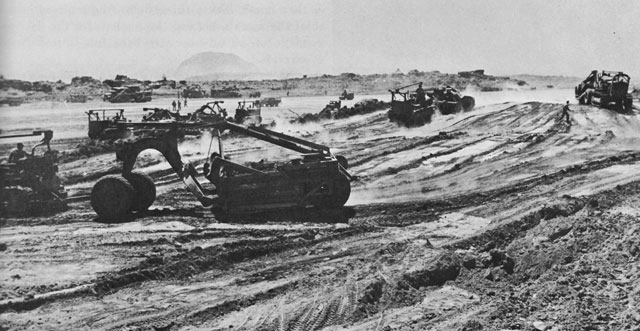
Fierce combat continued as Airfield No. 1 was scraped and graded.

Floating reserve:

- 3rd Marine Division (19,597 officers and enlisted)
- Major General Graves B. Erskine
  - Assistant Division Commander: Brig. Gen. William A. Worton
  - Chief of Staff: Col. Robert E. Hogaboom
  - Personnel officer (D-1): Maj. Irving R. Kriendler
  - Intelligence officer (D-2): Lt. Col. Howard J. Turton
  - Operations officer (D-3): Col. Arthur H. Butler
  - Logistics officer (D-4): Col. James D. Hittle
- Committed to center sector D+2, attached to 4th Marine Division:
  - 21st Marine Regiment
  - Colonel Hartnoll J. Withers
  - Executive Officer: Lt. Col. Eustace R. Smoak
    - 1st Battalion (Lt. Col. Marlowe C. Williams (WIA 22 Feb), Maj. Clay M. Murray (WIA 22 Feb), Maj. Robert H. Houser)
      - CMoH recipient: Cpl. Hershel W. Williams
    - 2nd Battalion (Lt. Col. Lowell E. English (WIA 2 Mar), Maj. George A. Percy)
    - 3rd Battalion (Lt. Col. Wendell H. Duplantis)
- Committed D+6:
  - 9th Marine Regiment
  - Colonel Howard N. Kenyon
  - Executive Officer: Lt. Col. Paul W. Russell
    - 1st Battalion (Lt. Col. Carey A. Randall (to 6 Mar), Maj. William T. Glass (to 14 Mar), Lt. Col. Jack F. Warner)
      - CMoH recipient: Lt. John H. Leims
    - 2nd Battalion (Lt. Col. Robert E. Cushman, Jr.) (Note: Commanded all Marine Corps forces in Vietnam from June through December 1967.)
      - CMoH recipient: Pvt. Wilson D. Watson
    - 3rd Battalion (Lt. Col. Harold C. Boehm)
- Artillery
- 12th Marine Regiment (Artillery)
- Lieutenant Colonel Raymond F. Crist Jr.
  - Executive Officer: Lt. Col. Bernard H. Kirk
  - 1st Battalion (Maj. George B. Thomas)
  - 2nd Battalion (Lt. Col. William T. Fairbourn)
  - 3rd Battalion (Lt. Col. Alpha L. Bowser, Jr.)
  - 4th Battalion (Maj. Joe B. Wallen (to 20 Mar), Lt. Col. Thomas R. Belzer)
- Service Troops
- Colonel James O. Brauer (to 6 Mar), Colonel Lewis A. Hohn
  - Headquarters Battalion (Lt. Col. Jack F. Warner (to 14 Mar), Lt. Col. Carey A. Randall)
  - 3rd Tank Battalion (Lt. Col. Richard K. Schmidt)
  - 3rd Engineer Battalion (Lt. Col. Nelson K. Brown)
  - 3rd Pioneer Battalion (Lt. Col. Richard G. Ruby)
  - 3rd Service Battalion (Lt. Col. Paul G. Chandler)
  - 3rd Medical Battalion (Cmdr. Reuben L. Sharp, USN)
  - 3rd Motor Transport Battalion (Lt. Col. Ralph L. Schiesswohl)
  - Division Reconnaissance Company
- Attached units
  - 3rd Joint Assault Signal Company
  - Marine Observation Squadron 1
  - 3rd Marine War Dog Platoon
  - Joint Intelligence Center Pacific Ocean Areas Intelligence Team
  - Detachment, VAC Signal Battalion
  - 28th Replacement Draft
  - 34th Replacement Draft
- Never landed:
  - 3rd Marine Regiment
  - Colonel James A. Stuart

===== Garrison Forces =====
- Garrison Forces (Assault Echelon)
  - Major General James E. Chaney (US Army)
  - Detachment, Island Command Headquarters
  - Detachment, 147th Infantry Regiment (Ohio Army National Guard)
  - Detachment, Headquarters, VII Fighter Command (US Army)
  - Detachment, Headquarters, 15th Fighter Group
  - 47th Fighter Squadron
  - 78th Fighter Squadron
  - 548th Night Fighter Service
  - 386th Air Service Group, Special
  - 1st Platoon, 604th Quartermaster Graves Registration Company
  - 223rd Radar Maintenance Unit (Type C)
  - Detachment, Administrative Unit, Group Pacific 11
  - Port Directors Detachment
  - Garrison Beach Party
- Arrived on March 20
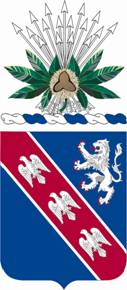
  - 147th Infantry Regiment
  - Colonel Robert F. Johnson
  - Executive Officer: Lt. Col. Eustace R. Smoak
    - 1st Battalion
    - 2nd Battalion
    - 3rd Battalion

== Japan ==
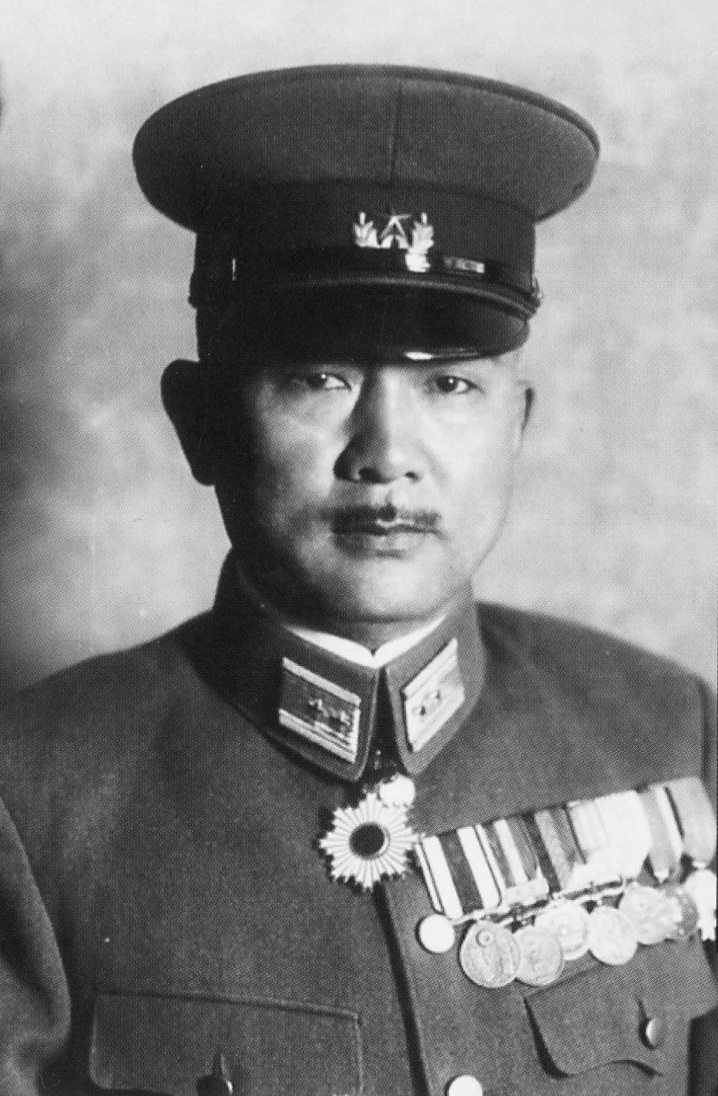
Lieut. Gen. Tadamichi Kuribayashi, commanding 109th Infantry Division

Ogasawara Army Group

- Lieutenant General Tadamichi Kuribayashi, commanding

Colonel Tadashi Takaishi, Chief of Staff
Total Japanese troops on Iwo Jima on 19 February 1945: 20,530 to 21,060

Army

- 109th Division
- Lieutenant General Tadamichi Kuribayashi
  - 109th Division Headquarters and Signal Company
  - 109th Division Anti-Aircraft Artillery Battalion (Major Azuma; 310-340 troops)
  - 2nd Mixed Brigade (Major General Senda; 5,100-5,200 troops)
    - 309th Infantry Battalion (Captain Awatsu)
    - 310th Infantry Battalion (Major Iwatani)
    - 311th Infantry Battalion (Major Tatsumi)
    - 312th Infantry Battalion (Captain Osada)
    - 314th Infantry Battalion (Captain Hakuda)
    - Artillery Battalion, 2nd Mixed Brigade (Major Maeda)
    - Engineer Battalion, 2nd Mixed Brigade (Major Maekawa)
    - Field Hospital, 2nd Mixed Brigade (Commander not known)
  - 145th Infantry Regiment (Colonel Ikeda; 2,200-2,400 troops)
    - 1st Battalion, 145th Regiment (Major Hara)
    - 2nd Battalion, 145th Regiment (Major Yasutake)
    - 3rd Battalion, 145th Regiment (Major Anso)
    - Artillery Battalion, 145th Regiment (Captain Masuda)
    - Engineer Company, 145th Regiment (Commander not known)
    - Field Hospital, 145th Regiment (Commander not known)
- 26th Tank Regiment (Lieutenant Colonel Nishi; 500-600 troops)
- 3rd Battalion, 17th Mixed Regiment (Captain Shimotsuma; 550 troops)
- 2nd Medium Mortar Battalion (Reinforced) (Major Nakao; 700 troops)
- 3rd Medium Mortar Battalion (Reinforced) (Major Kobayashi; 500 troops)
- 20th Artillery Mortar Battalion (Reinforced) (Captain Mizuashi; 800 troops)
- Army Rocket Unit (3 × companies; 150-220 troops)
- Machine gun battalions: (600 troops))
  - 1st Machine Gun Battalion (Captain Kawana)
  - 2nd Machine Gun Battalions (Captain Kawasaki)
- Anti-Tank battalions: (1,250 troops)
  - 8th Anti-Tank Battalion (Captain Shimizu)
  - 9th Anti-Tank Battalion (Major Okubo)
  - 10th Anti-Tank Battalion (Major Matsushita)
  - 11th Anti-Tank Battalion (Captain Node)
  - 12th Anti-Tank Battalion (Captain Hayauchi)
- Engineer units: (300 troops)
  - 1st Company, 1st Mixed Brigade Engineer Unit (Commander not known)
  - 5th Fortress Construction Duty Company (Commander not known)
  - 21st Well Drilling Unit (Commander not known)
  - Detachment, Shipping Engineers (Commander not known)
- Special machine cannon units: (250-300 troops)
  - 20th Special Machine Cannon Unit (with Naval Guard Force; 2nd Lieutenant Momozaki)
  - 21st Special Machine Cannon Unit (with Naval Guard Force; 2nd Lieutenant Kondo)
  - 43rd Special Machine Cannon Unit (with 109th Division Anti-Aircraft Artillery Battalion; 1st Lieutenant Tamara)
  - 44th Special Machine Cannon Unit (with 109th Division Anti-Aircraft Artillery Battalion; commander not known)

Navy

- Rear Admiral Rinosuke Ichimaru
- 27th Air Flotilla
- 2nd Air Attack Force
  - Naval Guard Force anti-aircraft batteries (2,400 troops; the four anti-aircraft defense units were disbanded and reorganized into the Iwo Jima Naval Guard Force prior to 19 February 1945)
    - 125th Anti-Aircraft Defense Unit (Lieutenant (jg) Tamura)
    - 132nd Anti-Aircraft Defense Unit (Ensign Okumura)
    - 149th Anti-Aircraft Defense Unit (Commander not known)
    - 141st Anti-Aircraft Defense Unit (Lieutenant (jg) Doi)
- Iwo Jima Naval Guard Force (Captain Inoue; formed before 19 February 1945)
- Naval Guard Force Coast Defense Batteries (640 troops)
- Nanpo Air Group Naval Land Force (Captain Inoue)
  - Southern Air Group (Naval Guard Force troops, construction personnel, technicians; 2,250 troops)
  - 204th Naval Construction Battalion (Lieutenant Iida; 1,410 troops)
  - Technical Air Personnel (320 troops)

== See also ==
Orders of battle involving United States Marine forces in the Pacific Theatre of World War II:

- Battle of Guadalcanal order of battle
- Battle of Tarawa opposing forces
- Battle of Saipan order of battle
- Guam (1944) order of battle
- Battle of Leyte opposing forces
- Battle of Peleliu opposing forces
- Okinawa ground order of battle

== Sources ==
- Clark, George B. (2006). The Six Marine Divisions in the Pacific: Every Campaign of World War II. Jefferson, North Carolina: McFarland and Co. ISBN 978-0-7864-2769-7.
- Morison, Samuel Eliot (1960). Victory in the Pacific, 1945. History of United States Naval Operations in World War II. Vol. XIV. Little, Brown and Co. LCCN 47-1571.
