= John A. Butler =

USMC Navy Cross recipient

John Augustus Butler
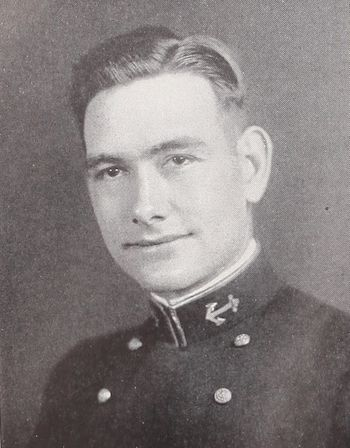
- Butler c. 1934
- Born: September 30, 1910; New Orleans, Louisiana, US
- Died: March 5, 1945 (aged 34); Iwo Jima, Japan
- Burial place: National Memorial Cemetery of the Pacific
- Military career
- Allegiance: United States
- Branch: United States Marine Corps
- Service years: 1934–1945
- Rank: Lieutenant Colonel
- Commands: 1st Battalion, 27th Marines
- Conflicts: World War II; Battle of Iwo Jima †
- Awards: Navy Cross; Purple Heart

John Augustus Butler (September 30, 1910 – March 5, 1945) was a highly decorated United States Marine Corps lieutenant colonel. He was killed in action during the Battle of Iwo Jima in World War II and was posthumously awarded the Navy Cross.

== Early life and career ==
John A. Butler was born on September 30, 1910, in New Orleans, Louisiana. After graduating from high school, he attended Loyola University for two years before he accepted an appointment to the United States Naval Academy at Annapolis, Maryland. Upon graduating with the class of 1934, Butler was commissioned as a second lieutenant in the Marine Corps. He then attended the Basic School at Philadelphia, Pennsylvania until April 1935.

Butler was then assigned to the Marine detachment aboard the USS Trenton. The Trenton was permanently based out of Panama with the Special Service Squadron. Butler quickly became fluent in Spanish and was often sent ashore to coordinate port calls. He also served aboard the USS Memphis and USS Omaha during this time.

In January 1936, Butler attended a course at the Marine barracks in Quantico, Virginia. He remained in Quantico as a staff member until the end of the year. In 1937, Butler was stationed at Washington, D.C., first with Headquarters Marine Corps and then with the Latin American Section in the Office of Naval Intelligence. In July 1938, Butler was assigned to 1st Battalion, 5th Marines in Quantico.

== World War II ==
=== Naval attaché ===
In February 1940, Butler was made a Naval attaché at the U.S. Embassy in Ciudad Trujillo, Dominican Republic. That May, Butler was promoted to captain. Butler was in the Dominican Republic when the United States entered World War II. The Dominican Republic sided with the Allies and Butler worked with the dictator, Rafael Trujillo, in tracking down and deporting German spies and sympathizers. By March 1943, Butler was promoted to lieutenant colonel.

Despite his success as a Naval attaché, Butler continually requested a combat assignment. His requests were finally approved and he attended the Command and Staff School in Quantico from October to December 1943.

=== 5th Marine Division ===
Upon graduating, Butler was assigned to the newly activated 5th Marine Division in San Diego. Arriving at his new unit in January 1944, he was originally made the executive officer of Colonel Thomas A. Wornham's 27th Marine Regiment. However, he was soon given command of 1st Battalion, 27th Marines. In August, the 27th Marine Regiment moved to Camp Tarawa, Hawaii. In January 1945, the division left Camp Tarawa, conducting mock amphibious landings on Maui before stopping for a brief liberty in Pearl Harbor. On January 26, Butler's battalion embarked for Iwo Jima aboard the USS Hansford.

==== Battle of Iwo Jima ====
On February 19, 1945, Butler led his battalion ashore with the fourth wave at Red Beach Two during the battle of Iwo Jima. Under heavy fire, Butler led his Marines 150 yards inland, setting up his battalion command post on top of a blockhouse which was occupied by the enemy. Butler then coordinated his men in assaulting Motoyama Airfield Number One. While the left assault company circled the southern edge of the airfield, the right assault company became pinned down by heavy fire. Butler moved forward from his command post to the base of the airfield, where he directed his right assault company in moving forward. Butler's leadership resulted in the capture of the southern portion of the airfield by the end of February 20.

On February 22, the 27th Marines were subjected to rain and artillery fire the entire day, before the regiment was placed in the division reserve. On February 27, the regiment rotated back to the front line, becoming the main assault force during the battle for Hill 362A. Butler led his battalion in a fierce battle for control of Hill 362A for the next two days. C Company advanced just short of the summit, taking heavy casualties. A Company relieved the battered C Company and repelled a Japanese counterattack. On March 1, the 27th Marines again rotated to the division reserve, and Hill 362A was eventually captured by the 26th and 28th Marines after another day of intense fighting.

On March 2, Butler was ordered to have his battalion provide defensive support for the 26th Marines. The next day, 1/27 was attached to the 26th Marines and participated in an assault on Hill 362B. On March 4, C Company took heavy casualties while advancing just 100 yards. The entire division was ordered to rest on the next day, as the combat effectiveness of the Marines was now less than 50 percent.

==== Death ====
On March 5, 1/27 was detached from the 26th Marines. At roughly 13:00 hours, Butler was riding in his jeep to the regiment command post when the vehicle was struck by a 47mm shell. While his driver and another passenger survived the blast, Butler was instantly killed. The regimental operations officer, Lieutenant Colonel Justin G. Duryea, assumed command of 1/27 after Butler's death. For his actions during the battle of Iwo Jima, Butler was posthumously awarded the Navy Cross.

== See also ==
- List of Navy Cross recipients for World War II
