= Joint assault signal company =

Joint service unit in the United States armed forces

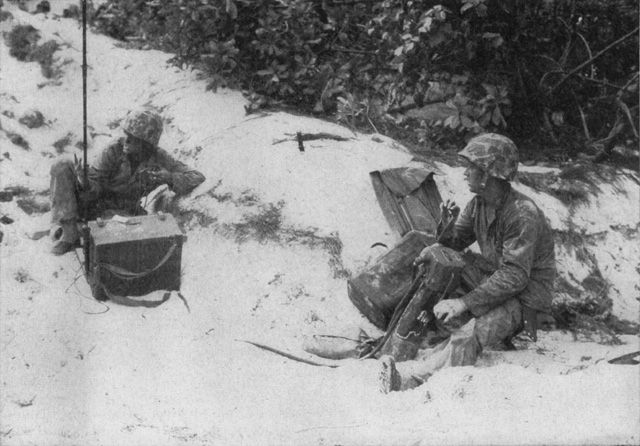
Members of the 1st JASCO on Saipan, 1944

A joint assault signal company (JASCO) was a joint service unit that provided ship to shore and air to ground communications to coordinate and control naval gunfire and close air support for American land forces during World War II. They were composed of specially trained officers and enlisted personnel from the Navy, Marines, and Army. The Army component was composed of Air Liaison Officers (now Forward Air Controllers) and enlisted communications technicians. JASCOs were created in the Pacific because previous small communication teams were ineffective and only served to clutter communications. After the costly Battle of Tarawa, the need for centralized command and control of air and naval fire support between the Navy, Marines, and Army was seen. Major General Alexander Vandegrift formed the Joint Assault Signal Companies based on his experiences in the Guadalcanal campaign. Navajo and other Native American code talkers were often attached to JASCOs.

== Background ==
The formation of JASCOs parallels the formation of US Army Pathfinder teams in the aftermath of the Battle of Sicily. Lacking guidance and control, Army paratroopers landed all over the island, far from their intended drop zones. Despite this, they managed to achieve most of their objectives due to the initiative and leadership of the officers and NCOs. The US Army sought to rectify the problem by creating their own Pathfinder units patterned after similar British units, which would jump in ahead of a parachute assault and mark the drop zones, providing terminal air guidance to the drop aircraft. JASCOs were a similar response to command and control deficiencies noted in the after action reports for the Battle of Guadalcanal and the Battle of Tarawa.

== Units ==
The first Joint Assault Signal Company (JASCO) was formed in October 1943 as a battalion-sized unit named the 1st Joint Assault Signal Company attached to the 4th Marine Division, under command of Lieutenant Colonel James G. Bishop Jr, Captain Murrary L. Thompson (Executive officer), and Warrant Officer William T. Farrar Jr (Adjutant).

JASCOs did not operate as a single unit but were composed of 13 detachments supplied to Army and Marine divisions, regiments, and battalions. Although JASCO units were first created for the United States Navy to coordinate ship-to-shore communications for naval gunfire and air support operations, they included United States Army personnel, Army pilots, and enlisted communication personnel. As the Pacific War advanced, the need for more JASCO units was realized, and units were created and attached to Marine divisions. By the time of invasion of the Philippines, the Army was creating its own JASCOs to support its infantry divisions. These JASCOs were primarily staffed by Army personnel, but had Navy personnel as well. Each JASCO was divided into a battalion shore and beach party communication section, a shore fire control section, and an air liaison section, with each section further subdivided into teams.

=== Marine Division Assignments ===
Each Marine division had their own JASCO as follows:

- 1st Joint Assault Signal Party, Signal Company – 1st Provisional Marine Brigade
- 1st JASCO – 4th Marine Division
- 2nd JASCO – 2nd Marine Division
- 3rd JASCO – 3rd Marine Division
- 4th JASCO – 1st Marine Division reorganized after Pelliu into 1st JASCO
- 5th JASCO – 5th Marine Division
- 6th JASCO – 6th Marine Division

=== Campaign credits ===
JASCOs took part in the following European and Pacific Theater operations:

==== US Marine Corps JASCOs ====
- 1st Joint Assault Signal Party: Guam
- 1st JASCO: Roi-Namur, Saipan, Tinian, Iwo Jima
- 2nd JASCO: Enewitok, Saipan, Tinian
- 3rd JASCO: Guam, Iwo Jima
- 4th JASCO: Peleliu, Okinawa
- 5th JASCO: Iwo Jima
- 6th JASCO: Okinawa

==== US Army JASCOs ====
- 1st Joint Assault Signal Party: Guam
- 4th JASCO: Ryukyus
- 6th JASCO: Ryukyus
- 71st JASCO: Leyte, Naples-Foggia (ground), Sicily
- 75th JASCO: Eastern Mandates (ground), Leyte, Luzon, New Guinea, Ryukyus
- 76th JASCO: Ryukyus
- 286th JASCO: Algeria-French Morocco, Naples-Foggia (ground), Normandy, Northern France, Rome-Arno, Sicily
- 292nd JASCO: Ryukyus, Western Pacific
- 293rd JASCO: Luzon, New Guinea, Normandy, Northern France
- 294th JASCO: Normandy, Northern France
- 295th JASCO: Eastern Mandates (ground), Luzon, Northern Solomons, Southern Philippines, Western Pacific (ground)
- 593rd JASCO: Bismarck Archipelago, Leyte, Luzon, Ryukyus
- 594th JASCO: Ryukyus

== Operations ==
=== Marshall Islands ===
The first JASCO operation involved the 1st JASCO attached to the 4th Marine Division under command of Major General Holland Smith's V Amphibious Corps during the Battle of Kwajalein in the Marshall Islands. The Marines landed on the island of Roi-Namur on 1 February and cleared the island by the next day. No JASCO casualties were incurred. Although their time in combat was short, the experience gained during the battle allowed JASCO to improve their tactics.

=== Mariana Islands ===
The next operation was during the capture of Tinian and Saipan in the Mariana Islands. The Battle of Saipan lasted from 15 June to 9 July 1944, and the Battle of Tinian lasted from 24 July to 1 August 1944. The battles cost JASCO 4 officers and 11 enlisted dead, 6 officers and 9 enlisted wounded, and 5 enlisted MIA. The communications teams of the 1st JASCO were key to coordinating the complex amphibious operation. On Tinian, Navajo code talkers were used only on a few occasions and proved unsatisfactory because of the time it took to decipher long encrypted communications.

On 24 August 1944, the 1st JASCO returned to Hawaii for refitting and training. The after action report for the 1st JASCO was critical of the Army component, stating that while the enlisted personnel were well trained, the officers provided were grounded pilots, and the qualifications of half of them "left much to be desired." The report also indicated a priority need for replacement personnel. There was such a loss of equipment, that the first two months of training back in Hawaii had to be limited to physical training, weapons training, and classroom work.

=== Iwo Jima ===
The following JASCO units took part in the Battle of Iwo Jima:

- 1st JASCO assigned 4th Marine Division
- 3rd JASCO assigned 3rd Marine Division
- 5th JASCO assigned 5th Marine Division

=== Okinawa ===
The following JASCO units took part in the Battle of Okinawa:

- 1st JASCO attached to 4th Marine Division
- 4th JASCO attached 1st Marine Division
- 6th JASCO attached 6th Marine Division
- 292nd JASCO attached 77th Infantry Division
- 593rd JASCO attached 96th Infantry Division
- 594th JASCO attached 27th Infantry Division
- 74th JASCO, attached 7th Infantry Division

=== Central Pacific Area ===
Two Army JASCOs supported the Central Pacific Area:

- 75th JASCO Army – southern half Kwajalein, Marshall Islands attached 7th Infantry Division (US Army)
- 295th JASCO Army – Kwajalein-Marshall Islands, Marianas and Guam – Marshall Islands attached 27th Infantry Division (US Army)

By the time of the Okinawa landing, the JASCO had improved its communications and transportation capabilities, with new equipment including radio jeeps.

Air Liaison Parties (ALPs) from the JASCOs attached to each division enabled the smooth functioning of coordinating agencies and front line direction of close air support from carrier aircraft and Tactical Air Force at 10th Army Headquarters.

=== Africa and Europe ===
In the African Campaign JASCO units were part of special engineer battalions, performing the same duties with a mix of Army and Navy personnel.

On 6 June 1944, there were three distinct JASCO units storming the beaches of Normandy. They were:

- 293rd JASCO
- 294th JASCO
- 296th JASCO

== Legacy ==
JASCO units were disbanded and their responsibility transferred to the US Navy with the signing of the National Security Act of 1947. In 1949, the Marine Corps began recreating JASCO capability under the ANGLICO designation. The United States Army created its own JASCO units for the European Theater of Operations. Their function has since been incorporated into the Signal Corps.
