= 1st Battalion, 28th Marines =

- Country: United States of America
- Branch: United States Marine Corps
- Type: Infantry battalion
- Role: Locate, close with and destroy the enemy with fire and maneuver
- Size: 1000
- Part of: Inactive
- Engagements: World War II: Battle of Iwo Jima; Vietnam War

The 1st Battalion, 28th Marines (1/28) is an inactive infantry battalion of the United States Marine Corps. They were part of the 28th Marine Regiment and 5th Marine Division and fought during the Battle of Iwo Jima in World War II.

== Iwo Jima ==
By the end of the campaign, 1/28 had suffered heavy casualties, especially among junior officers. In the line companies (A, B, and C), only two of twenty-two officers were neither killed nor wounded. This statistic excludes the replacement officers.

== Unit awards ==
- Presidential Unit Citation, 19-28 February 1945, Iwo Jima

== Notable former members ==
- William G. Harrell, recipient of the Medal of Honor
- Tony Stein, recipient of the Medal of Honor

== See also ==
- History of the United States Marine Corps
- List of United States Marine Corps battalions
