= 27th Marine Regiment (United States) =

Deactivated infantry regiment of the United States Marine Corps

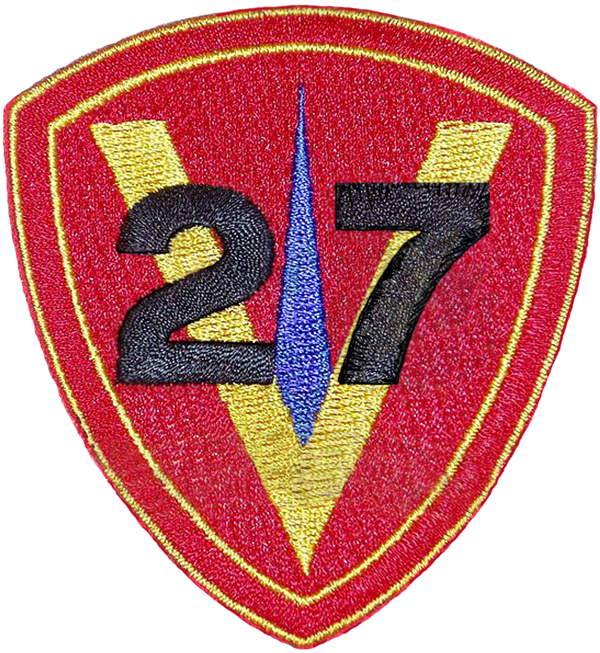
- 27th Marine Regiment emblem
- Active: 1944–46; 1966–69
- Country: United States
- Branch: United States Marine Corps
- Type: Infantry
- Part of: 5th Marine Division
- Engagements: World War II: Battle of Iwo Jima; Vietnam War: Operation Allen Brook

Commanders
- Notable commanders: Thomas A. Wornham

The 27th Marine Regiment (27th Marines) is an inactivated infantry regiment of the United States Marine Corps. They fought during the battle of Iwo Jima in World War II and again for a short time during the Vietnam War.

== Subordinate units ==
The regiment comprised three infantry battalions, a headquarters and service company, and a weapons company:

Battalions
Headquarters & Service Company
1st Battalion, 27th Marines (1/27)
2nd Battalion, 27th Marines (2/27)
3rd Battalion, 27th Marines (3/27)
Weapons Company

== History ==
=== World War II ===
The 27th Marine Regiment was activated on 10 January 1944, as a result of the massive increase in the Marine Corps during World War II. The regiment first saw action during the Battle of Iwo Jima. During the course of the battle they suffered 566 killed, 1,706 wounded, and had 4 Marines receive the Medal of Honor. After the surrender of Japan the regiment was inactivated on 10 January 1946.

=== Vietnam War ===
The 27th Marines was again reactivated during the Vietnam War on 1 January 1966, but was mainly used as a pool for new replacements before they went overseas. The 1st Battalion based at Marine Corps Air Station Kaneohe Bay, Hawaii was the only battalion with personnel assigned in 1966.

During 1967 the 2nd and 3rd Battalions stationed on the east coast of the U.S. were brought up to strength.

On 12 February 1968 in response to the Tet Offensive, President Lyndon B. Johnson authorized an increase in U.S. troop strength in South Vietnam and the 27th Marines was one of the units sent. On 10 and 12 February, the 1st Battalion, 27th Marines, at Hawaii had embarked on board the USS Vancouver, USS Bexar and the USS Washburn to participate in two landing exercises on Okinawa, but with the new orders the ships proceeded to Da Nang. Between 14 and 21 February, the rest of regimental landing team (RLT) 27 deployed by sea and air from Camp Pendleton to Da Nang. Military Airlift Command planes flew more than 3,300 men of the regiment from California to Vietnam. By 17 February, the 27th Marines headquarters, together with those of battalion landing teams (BLT) 2/27 and 3/27 opened their command posts at Da Nang. The forces arriving as part of RLT 27 also included personnel from the artillery battalion, 2nd Battalion, 13th Marines. On 21 February, the USS Thomaston departed Naval Base San Diego with the surface elements of the RLT, some 200 personnel and over 5,000 tons of equipment. By the end of the month, the 1st Battalion had joined the other two battalions of the regiment at Da Nang. By the end of February, the 2nd Battalion relieved the 3rd Battalion, 5th Marines and the 3rd Battalion relieved the 2nd Battalion, 3rd Marines in the southwest Da Nang tactical area of responsibility (TAOR). During March the 1/27th Marines remained in reserve while the other two battalions conducted over 2,900 small unit patrols throughout its TAOR resulting in about 310 contacts, 182 initiated by the Marines and the remainder by the Vietcong (VC). At the end of March 1/27th Marines was moved north to provide security of Route 1 between Huế and Phu Bai Combat Base and the protection of Tân Mỹ Base.

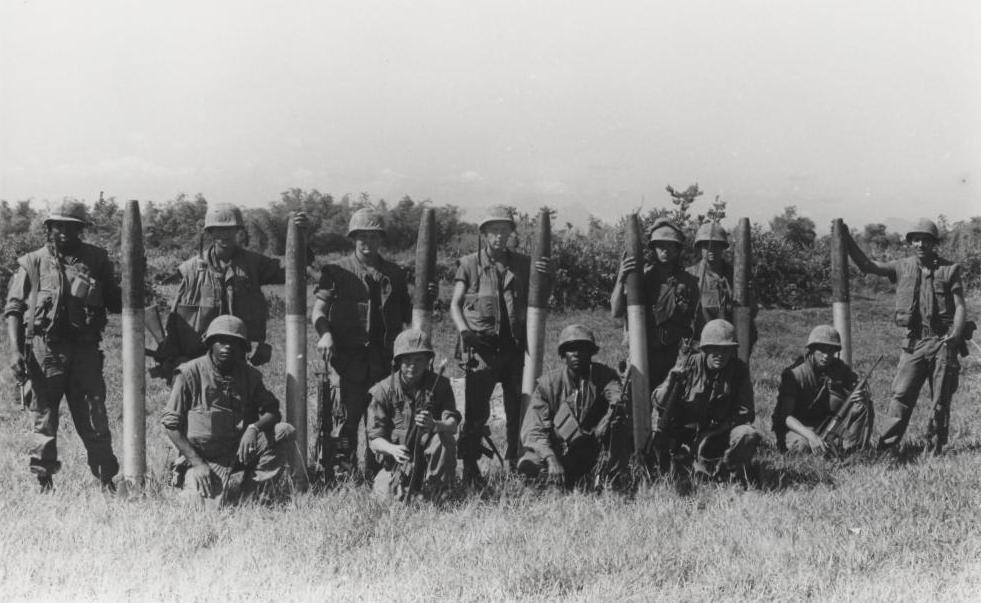
2nd Platoon, Company I, 3/27 Marines with captured 122mm rockets

On 5 May a seven-man ambush patrol from the 1st Battalion murdered five South Vietnamese civilians near Huế. Five of the seven Marines were convicted of murder.

On 13 May elements of the 3rd Battalion joined Operation Allen Brook. The entire regiment later joined the operation and assumed operational control until 3 August.

The deployment of the regiment overseas was only intended to be temporary and in March Johnson instructed that it was to return to the U.S. by 15 July, but this was delayed until September due to delays in the training of replacement United States Army forces. The deployment had put a severe strain on manpower in the Marine Corps.

While the regiment was preparing for its redeployment to the U.S. in August the VC launched their Phase III offensive and 1st Battalion participated in the defense of Danang Air Base while the 2nd Battalion participated in operations to cut off the retreating VC and People's Army of Vietnam (PAVN) forces.

By late August the 1st Marine Regiment had arrived in the Da Nang TAOR and it began to relieve the Regiment. On 12 September, the first planeload of Regiment Marines left for Okinawa and on 17 September the last of BLT 1/27 arrived in Hawaii.

A homecoming parade was presented as a Memorial Ceremony downtown San Diego to the lives the regiment had given in South Vietnam. The unit was then reassigned to Camp Pendleton within the area of the base called Camp Margarita or the 33 Area.

== Notable former members ==
- John Basilone, served with machine guns during World War II
- John A. Butler, served as Commanding Officer of 1st Battalion during the battle of Iwo Jima
- Jack Chevigny, served as Liaison Officer of H&S Company, during the battle of Iwo Jima
- Jack Lummus, served with F Company, 2nd Battalion, 27th Marines
- Donn J. Robertson, served as Commanding Officer of 3rd Battalion during the battle of Iwo Jima
- Thomas A. Wornham, served as Commanding Officer during the battle of Iwo Jima

== See also ==
- List of United States Marine Corps regiments
