= William G. Harrell =

United States Marine Corps Medal of Honor recipient

William George Harrell
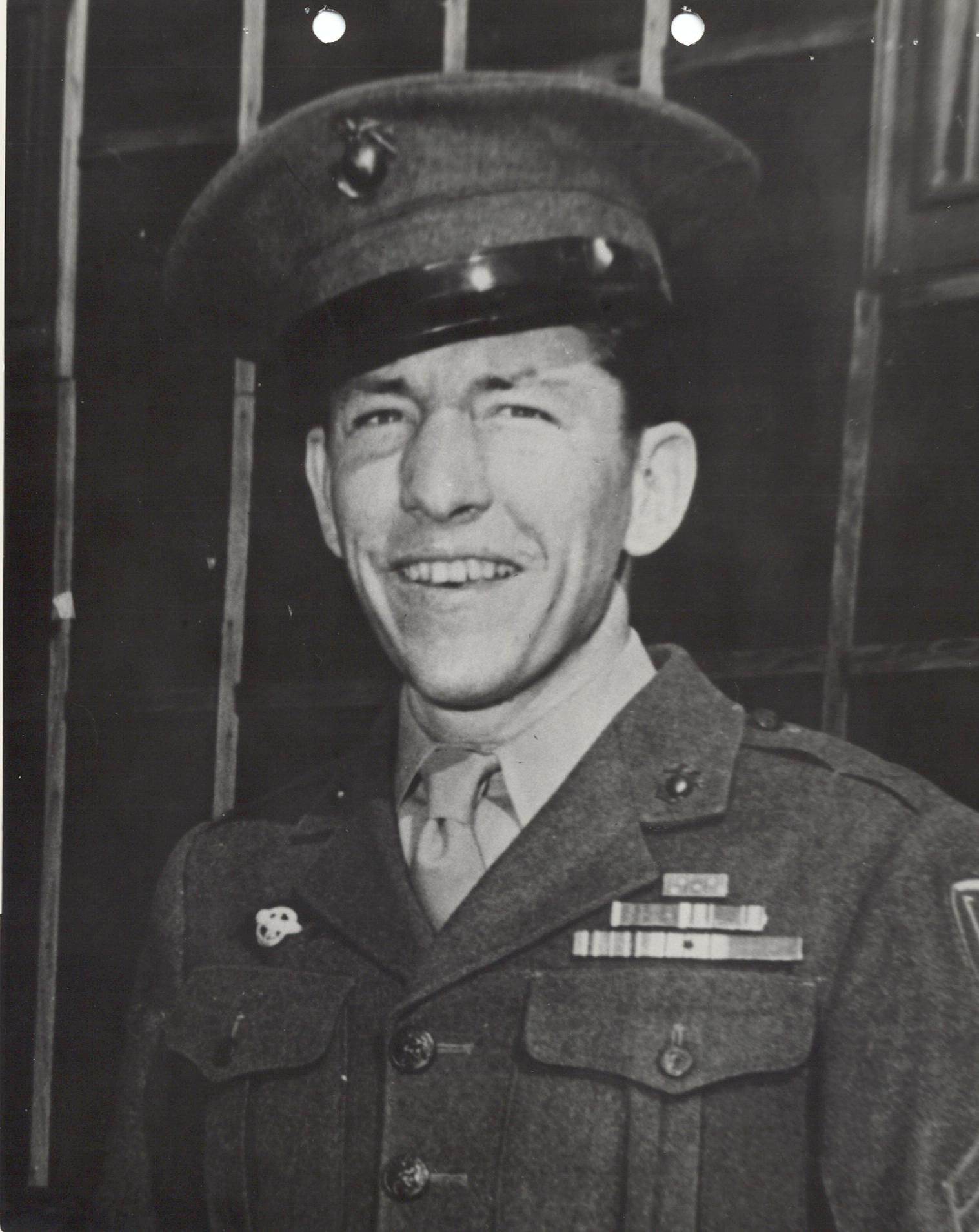
- Born: June 16, 1922; Rio Grande City, Texas
- Died: August 9, 1964 (aged 42); San Antonio, Texas
- Burial place: Fort Sam Houston National Cemetery, San Antonio, Texas
- Military career
- Allegiance: United States of America
- Branch: United States Marine Corps
- Service years: 1942–1946
- Rank: Sergeant
- Unit: 1st Battalion, 28th Marines
- Conflicts: World War II; Battle of Iwo Jima
- Awards: Medal of Honor; Purple Heart
- Other work: Chief of the Prosthetics Division, Veterans Administration, San Antonio

William George Harrell (June 16, 1922 – August 9, 1964) was a United States Marine who was awarded his nation's highest military honor – the Medal of Honor – for his heroic actions in the Battle of Iwo Jima.

== Early years ==
William Harrell was born in Rio Grande City, Texas, on June 26, 1922, and later moved to Mercedes, Texas. He attended high school in Mercedes, graduating in 1939, and then went on to Texas A&M University for two years prior to his enlistment in the United States Marine Corps on July 3, 1942, in Harlingen, Texas.

== Marine Corps service ==
Completing his recruit training at Marine Corps Recruit Depot San Diego, California, he was temporarily in the 1st Guard Company at that base, prior to his transfer to Headquarters and Service Company, 2nd Battalion, Camp Elliott, San Diego, California, in September 1942. He was promoted to private first class upon his arrival at Camp Elliott, and while there was later advanced to corporal.

Following completion of the Basic Rocket Course, Cpl Harrell departed for overseas duty in February 1943 with Company A, 1st Battalion, 28th Marines, 5th Marine Division, as an armorer. He first served in Hawaii, then went on to Saipan then to Iwo Jima.

Sgt Harrell earned the Medal of Honor during the Iwo Jima campaign for continuing to halt a Japanese advance toward his Command Post although suffering from the loss of both hands and several saber cuts on his legs. On March 3, 1945, Sgt Harrell and his friend Pfc Andrew J. Carter, Jr., dug in for the night in a long narrow two-man foxhole on Iwo Jima, on a little ridge 20 yards forward of the depression where the company command post was established. Beyond the foxhole the ridge fell off into a ravine which was in Japanese territory. Because of their nearness to the enemy, the two men took turns standing one-hour watches throughout the night while the other slept.

An attack by the Japanese was repulsed, but Pfc Carter's weapon jammed and he returned to the command post to obtain another. While he was gone, the enemy managed to get a grenade in the foxhole, which exploded, blowing off Sgt Harrell's left hand.

Pfc Carter returned just as the Japanese were swarming up the foxhole and together he and Sgt Harrell drove them off. During this assault Pfc Carter's new rifle also jammed, which forced Carter to repulse the attackers with an Arisaka bayonet. Thinking he was dying due to the severity of his wounds and saber cuts suffered in the last repulse, Sgt Harrell ordered Pfc Carter, also seriously wounded, to retire to safety.

Pfc Carter left, but only to get another rifle and stretcher-bearers. During his absence, two Japanese charged the foxhole, setting off another grenade. As Sgt Harrell attempted to push it out of the hole, it exploded, tearing off his right hand, but also killing the attacking Japanese. Pfc Carter returned to Sgt Harrell and remained at his side until daybreak. They were surrounded by twelve dead Japanese, each Marine having killed at least five. Pfc Carter would be awarded the Navy Cross for this action, the United States Naval Service's second-highest military decoration. Sgt Harrell was evacuated and treated at various field hospitals before he arrived in the United States, he was a patient at the Bethesda Naval Hospital, Bethesda, Maryland, while awaiting the presentation of the Medal of Honor.

He was presented the nation's highest military decoration by President Harry S. Truman at the White House on Friday, October 5, 1945. Sgt Harrell was discharged from the Marine Corps at his present rank in February 1946 because of disability resulting from his wounds.

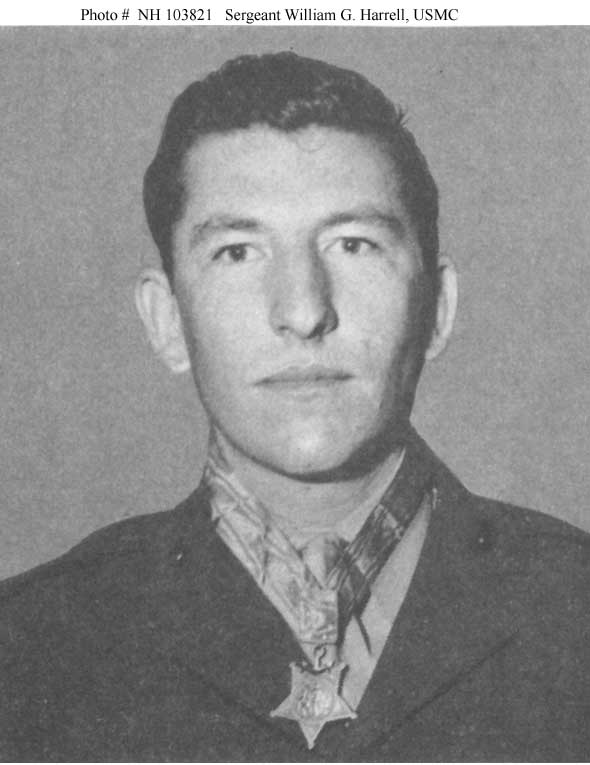
Portrait of Harrell with his Medal of Honor

== Final days ==
After the war, Harrell worked for the Veteran's Administration. He specialized in helping other amputees. He married and had children. Sergeant Harrell died on August 9, 1964, in San Antonio, Texas, and was laid to rest in Fort Sam Houston National Cemetery, San Antonio.

The tragic circumstances surrounding Harrell's death remains a mystery. On the evening of August 8, 1964, Harrell had been at a party with friends. Sometime after midnight on August 9, in his own residence, Harrell shot and killed his friends, Edward and Geraldine Zumwalt, and then turned the gun on himself. The bodies were discovered the following morning by Harrell's family when they returned from an out-of-town trip. The motivation for the killings was never determined.

== Medal of Honor citation ==
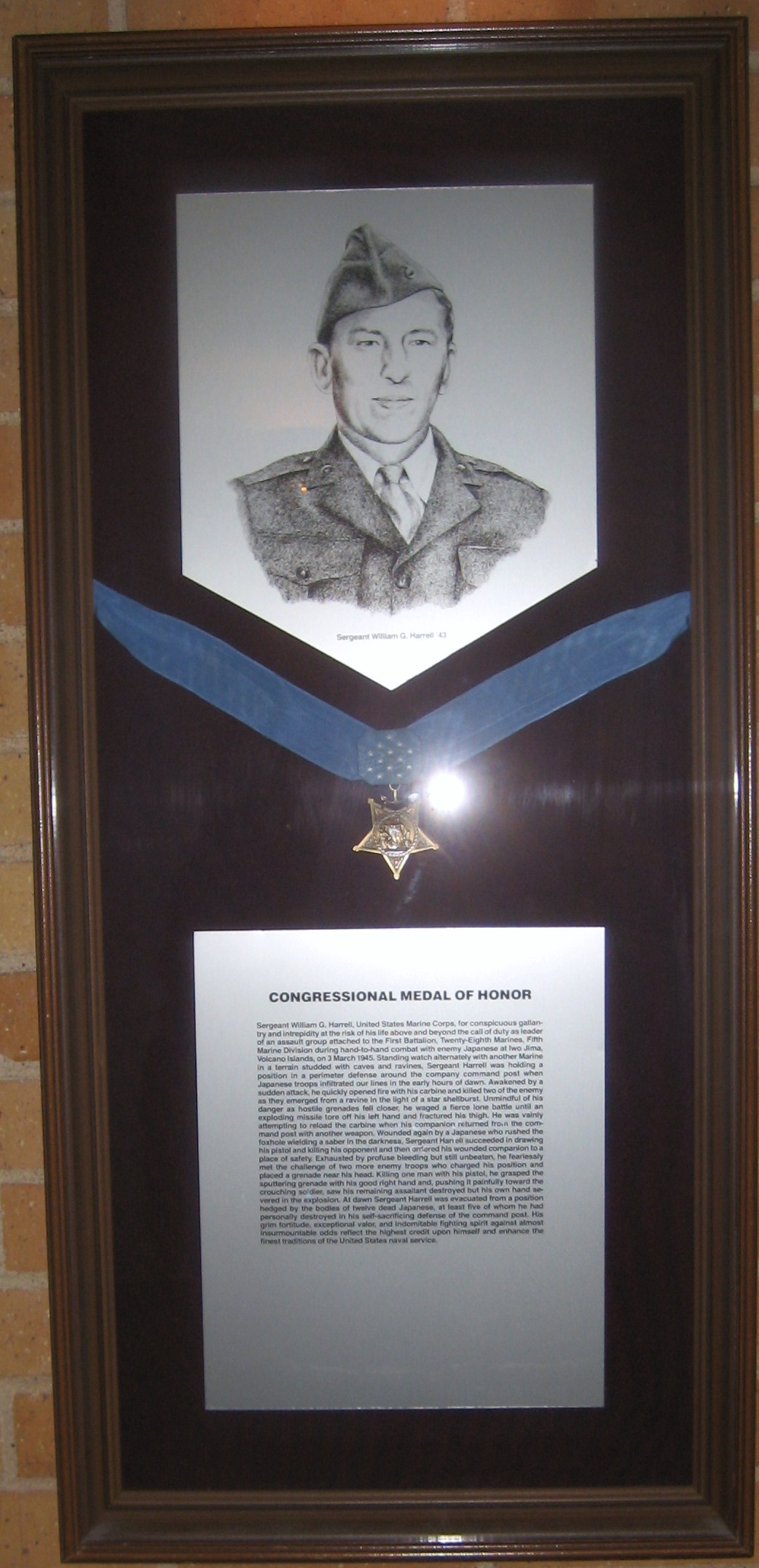
William G. Harrell and a specimen Medal of Honor on display at Texas A&M University

The President of the United States takes pleasure in presenting the MEDAL OF HONOR to

SERGEANT WILLIAM G. HARRELL
UNITED STATES MARINE CORPS

for service as set forth in the following CITATION:

For conspicuous gallantry and intrepidity at the risk of his life above and beyond the call of duty as Leader of an Assault Group, serving with the First Battalion, Twenty-Eight Marines, Fifth Marine Division, during hand- to-hand combat with enemy Japanese at Iwo Jima, Volcano Islands, on March 3, 1945. Standing watch alternately with another Marine in a terrain studded with caves and ravines, Sergeant Harrell was holding a position in a perimeter defense around the company command post when Japanese troops infiltrated our lines in the early hours of dawn. Awakened by a sudden attack, he quickly opened fire with his carbine and killed two of the enemy as they emerged from a ravine in the light of a star-shell burst. Unmindful of his danger as hostile grenades fell closer, he waged a fierce lone battle until an exploding missile tore off his left hand and fractured his thigh; he was attempting to reload the carbine when his companion returned from the command post with another weapon. Wounded again by a Japanese who rushed the foxhole wielding a saber in the darkness, Sergeant Harrell succeeded in drawing his pistol and killing his opponent and then ordered his wounded companion to a place of safety. Exhausted by profuse bleeding but still unbeaten, he fearlessly met the challenge of two more enemy troops who charged his position and placed a grenade near his head. Killing one man with his pistol, he grasped the sputtering grenade with his good right hand and, pushing it painfully toward the crouching soldier, saw his remaining assailant destroyed but his own hand severed in the explosion. At dawn Sergeant Harrell was evacuated from a position hedged by the bodies of twelve dead Japanese, at least five of whom he had personally destroyed in his self-sacrificing defense of the command post. His grim fortitude exceptional valor and indomitable fighting spirit against almost insurmountable odds reflect the highest credit upon himself and enhance the finest traditions of the United States Naval Service.

/S/ HARRY S. TRUMAN

== Awards and decorations ==

1st row	Medal of Honor		Purple Heart
2nd row	Combat Action Ribbon	Presidential Unit Citation	Marine Corps Good Conduct Medal
3rd row	American Campaign Medal	Asiatic-Pacific Campaign Medal with one campaign star	World War II Victory Medal

== See also ==
- List of Medal of Honor recipients
- List of Medal of Honor recipients for World War II
- List of Medal of Honor recipients for the Battle of Iwo Jima
