= Thomas A. Wornham =

U.S. Marine Corps Lieutenant General

Thomas Andrews Wornham
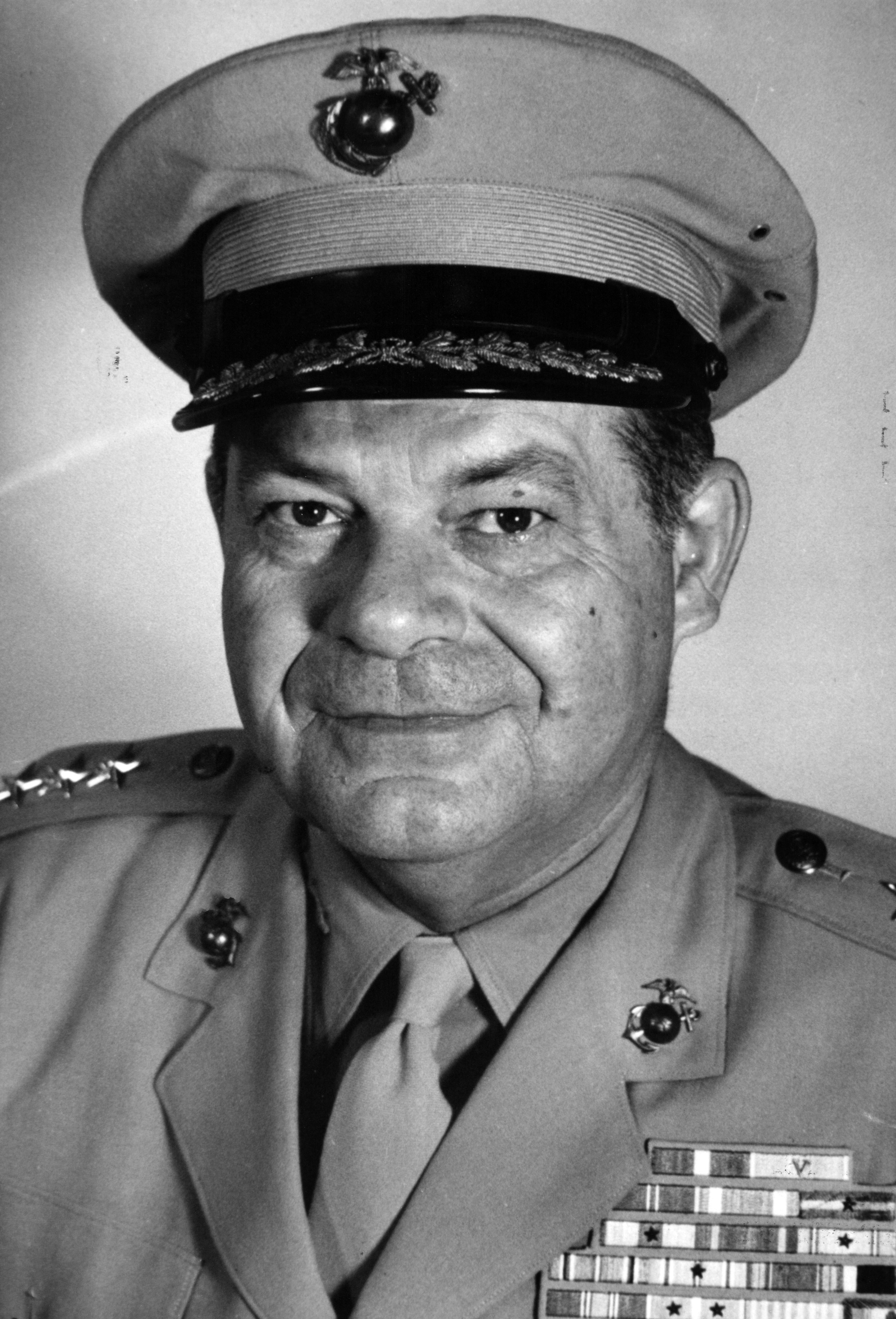
- Wornham as lieutenant general, USMC
- Born: December 12, 1903; Rensselaer, New York, US
- Died: December 17, 1984 (aged 81); San Diego, California, US
- Military career
- Allegiance: United States
- Branch: United States Marine Corps
- Service years: 1926–1961
- Rank: Lieutenant general
- Service number: 0-4079
- Commands: Fleet Marine Force, Pacific; MCRD San Diego; 3rd Marine Division; 27th Marine Regiment; 1st Marine Regiment
- Conflicts: Yangtze Patrol; Haitian Campaign; World War II; Battle of Iwo Jima; Korean War; Battle of the Punchbowl; Battle of Inje
- Awards: Navy Cross; Navy Distinguished Service Medal; Legion of Merit; Bronze Star Medal; Navy Commendation Medal

Thomas Andrews Wornham (December 12, 1903 – December 17, 1984) was a highly decorated officer of the United States Marine Corps with the rank of lieutenant general. He is most noted for his service as commanding officer of the 27th Marine Regiment during the Battle of Iwo Jima or as commanding officer of the 1st Marine Regiment during the Korean War.

== Early career ==
Thomas A. Wornham was born on December 12, 1903, in Rensselaer, New York. After the graduation from the high school, he attended the United States Naval Academy in Annapolis, Maryland, and graduated with the rank of second lieutenant in the Marine Corps on June 3, 1926.

Wornham was subsequently transferred to the Marine barracks within Philadelphia Navy Yard and attended the Field Officer's Course at local Basic school.

He was ordered for his first expeditionary duty in April 1927, when he was assigned to the Marine Barracks Shanghai, China. After his return to the United States, Wornham was assigned to the Marine detachment within summer camp of President Calvin Coolidge in Criglersville, Virginia, in November 1929. After five months of service there, he was assigned to the 1st Brigade of Marines and sailed for Haiti in March 1930. While served there, he was promoted to the rank of first lieutenant in March 1932.

Wornham returned to the United States in June 1933 and later attended Infantry School at Fort Benning, Georgia. Upon the graduation in June 1936, he was appointed instructor at Marine Corps School in Quantico, Virginia. Shortly thereafter, he was promoted to the rank of captain in August 1936. Wornham served in this capacity until September 1939.

== World War II ==
Captain Wornham was subsequently assigned to the Marine detachment aboard the light cruiser USS Helena and participated in the patrol voyage in the Caribbean. He was promoted to the rank of major in May 1941 and transferred to the Headquarters Marine Corps in Washington, D.C., where he served in the Personnel Division under Brigadier General Littleton W. T. Waller Jr. command. During his time at Headquarters Marine Corps, Wornham was promoted to the rank of lieutenant colonel in August 1942 and later decorated with the Navy Commendation Medal for his distinguished service there.

He served in this capacity until January 1944, when he was transferred to the Camp Pendleton, California to assume command of newly activated 27th Marine Regiment. Wornham supervised the formation and further training of the regiment and after promotion to colonel in June 1944, he sailed with the 27th Marine Regiment for Hawaii. His unit was subsequently assigned to the 5th Marine Division under Major General Keller E. Rockey and began preparing for the Iwo Jima operation.

On 19 February 1945, Colonel Wornham landed with the first waves of his regiment on Iwo Jima. He personally participated in the reconnaissance of the terrain under heavy mortar and small-arms fire and when one of his battalion was halted by enemy's fire, Wornham rallied his men to renew the attack and inflicted heavy losses on the Japanese. For his gallantry in action, he was decorated with the Navy Cross.

== Later career ==
Following the Japanese surrender in August 1945, Wornham commanded his regiment during the occupation duties in Japan until he was ordered back to the United States in December 1945. For his service in Japan, Wornham received the Bronze Star Medal. He was subsequently assigned to the Office of the Deputy Chief of Naval Operations for Personnel in Washington, D.C., as Marine Corps liaison officer.

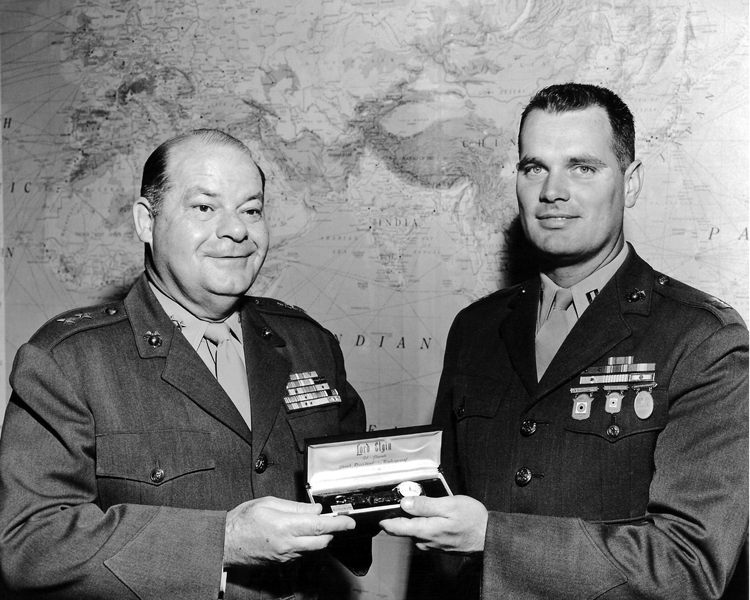
Thomas A. Wornham (MCRD San Diego) decorating William W. McMillan with an Elgin Wrist Watch for National Rifle and Pistol Matches 1957

Wornham served in this capacity only until September 1947, when he was assigned to the Naval Amphibious Base Little Creek, Virginia as deputy chief of staff and officer in charge of Troop Training Unit, Amphibious Training Command, Atlantic Fleet. He was subsequently appointed chief of staff of that unit in January 1948. Wornham served in that capacity until July 1949, when he was assigned to the senior course at Naval War College. He graduated in June 1950 and was appointed director of the Senior School within Marine Corps School at Quantico base.

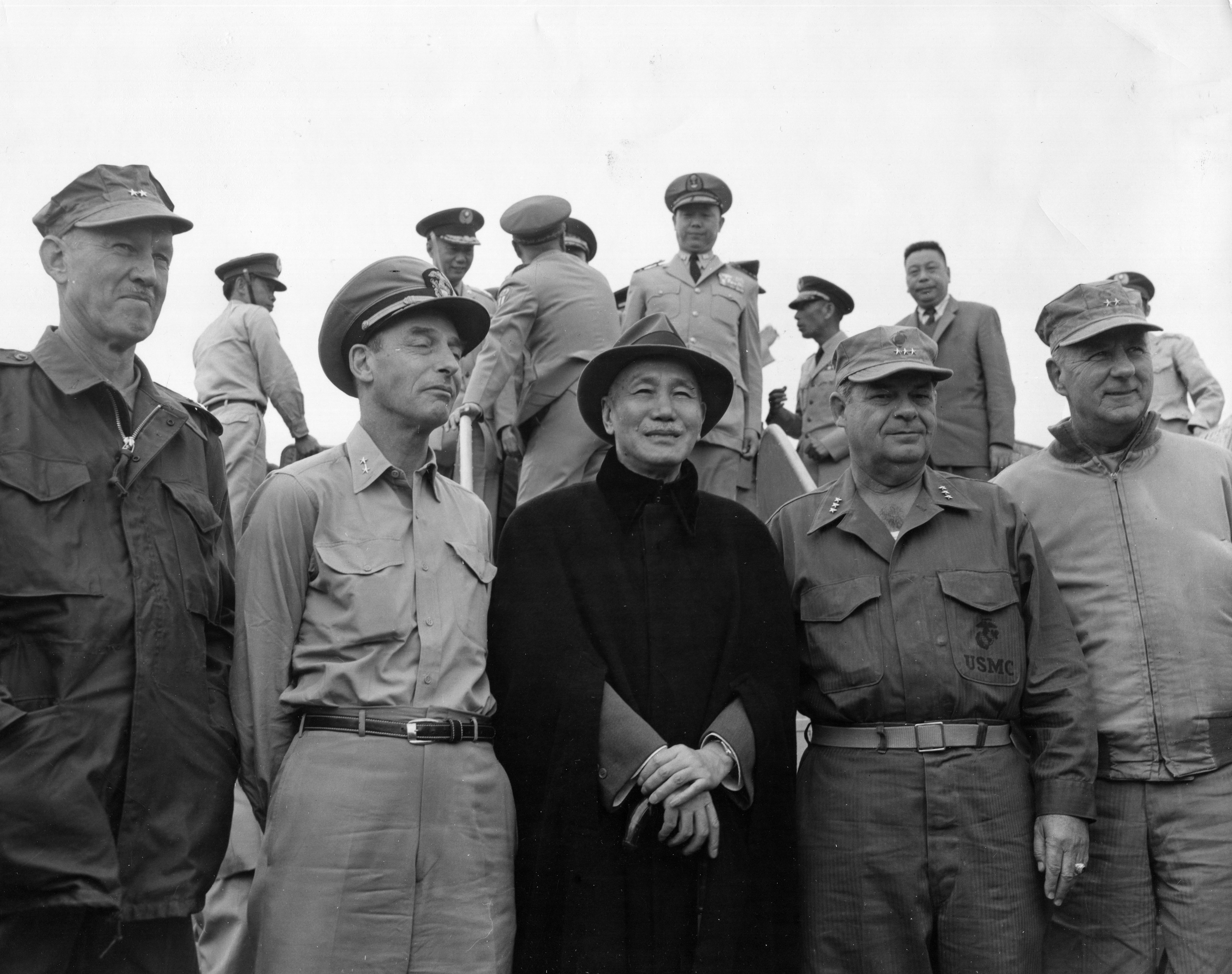
The Visit of Chiang Kai-shek during the fleet exercise on March 27, 1960. From left to right: MG Richard C. Mangrum (CG, 1st MAW), RADM Charles O. Triebel (Commander, Amphibious Group ONE), Chiang Kai-shek, Wornham (CG, FMFPac) and MG Robert B. Luckey (CG, 3rd Marine Division).

During the Korean War, Wornham was transferred to the 1st Marine Regiment, where he relieved Colonel Wilburt S. Brown in July 1951. The regiment participated in combat at East, Central and Western fronts where Colonel Wornham distinguished himself during the fighting in Inje region. He was subsequently decorated with the Legion of Merit with Combat "V". He remained in command of the regiment until the beginning of October 1951, when he was succeeded by Colonel Sidney S. Wade. He was subsequently appointed chief of staff of Fleet Marine Force, Pacific.

Colonel Wornham returned to Washington, D.C., in February 1952 and was assigned to Headquarters Marine Corps as assistant chief of staff for operations and training. While serving in this capacity, he was promoted to the rank of brigadier general in July 1952.

Wornham was promoted to the rank of major general in May 1955 and subsequently relieved Major General James P. Riseley as commanding general of the 3rd Marine Division stationed at Camp Courtney, Okinawa in July 1955. Wornham commanded 3rd Division during the defense duties of the Far Eastern area until the end of July 1956, when he was relieved by Major General Victor H. Krulak.

Major General Wornham almost immediately returned to the United States and was appointed commanding general of Marine Corps Recruit Depot San Diego, California. His new task was to train new recruits, which were subsequently assigned to other Marine units.

His final assignment came in October 1959, when he was appointed commanding general of the Fleet Marine Force, Pacific, the largest maritime landing force in the world. Wornham was promoted to the rank of lieutenant general the next month.

For his distinguished service in this capacity, he was decorated with the Navy Distinguished Service Medal.

Wornham was relieved by Lieutenant General Alan Shapley on March 31, 1961, and subsequently retired from the Marine Corps the following day.

== Life in retirement ==
Wornham retired with his wife to San Diego and was appointed to the San Diego Harbor Commission in early 1962. His task was to control and disposition of 1,800 acres of tidelands. He was appointed general manager of the Tri-Hospital Building Fund, the multimillion-dollar drive to provide funds for the expansion of Mercy, Sharp and Scripps hospitals.

Wornham died on December 17, 1984, and his ashes were scattered at sea on his own request.

== Decorations ==
Here is the ribbon bar of Lieutenant General Thomas A. Wornham:

1st row	Navy Cross			
2nd row	Navy Distinguished Service Medal	Legion of Merit with Combat "V"	Bronze Star Medal	Navy Commendation Medal
3rd row	Navy Presidential Unit Citation with one star	Marine Corps Expeditionary Medal with one star	Yangtze Service Medal	American Defense Service Medal with Base Clasp
4th row	American Campaign Medal	Asiatic-Pacific Campaign Medal with one 3/16 inch service star	World War II Victory Medal	Navy Occupation Service Medal
5th row	National Defense Service Medal with service star	Korean Service Medal with two 3/16 inch service stars	United Nations Korea Medal	Korean Presidential Unit Citation

=== Navy Cross citation ===
Citation:

The President of the United States of America takes pleasure in presenting the Navy Cross to Colonel Thomas Andrews Wornham (MCSN: 0-4079), United States Marine Corps, for extraordinary heroism as Commanding Officer of the Twenty-Seventh Marines, FIFTH Marine Division, in action against enemy Japanese forces on Iwo Jima, Volcano Islands, from 19 February to 27 March 1945. Landing with the assault waves on extremely difficult fire-swept beaches, Colonel Wornham led his combat team through heavy hostile fire to establish the initial beachhead in his sector. Serving gallantly throughout this entire operation, he made continuous reconnaissance of the terrain in his zone of action and exposed himself to heavy fire in front-line positions to encourage his men. Passing through an area infested with snipers on 12 March, he went to one of his battalions held up by strong enemy resistance and, despite intense mortar and small-arms fire, rallied his men to renew the attack and advance the front lines while inflicting heavy losses on the Japanese. His indomitable fighting spirit, aggressive leadership and devotion to duty were in keeping with the highest traditions of the United States Naval Service.

Military offices
Preceded by Vernon E. Megee	Commanding General of the Fleet Marine Force Pacific; 30 October 1959 - 31 March 1961	Succeeded by Alan Shapley
Preceded by John C. McQueen	Commanding General of Marine Corps Recruit Depot San Diego; 26 July 1956 – 26 October 1959	Succeeded by Bruno Hochmuth
Preceded by James P. Riseley	Commanding General of the 3rd Marine Division; 1 July 1955 – 26 July 1956	Succeeded by Victor H. Krulak
Preceded by Wilburt S. Brown	Commanding Officer of the 1st Marine Regiment; 18 July 1951 – 11 October 1951	Succeeded by Sidney S. Wade
