= Richard Kraus =

Richard Kraus may refer to:

- Richard E. Kraus (1925–1944), United States Marine and Medal of Honor recipient
  - USS Richard E. Kraus, a Gearing-class destroyer of the United States Navy
- Dick Kraus (1937–2019), Massachusetts educator and politician

== See also ==
- Richard M. Krause (1925–2015), American physician, microbiologist, and immunologist
