= CHPL =

CHPL may refer to:

- CHPL-FM, Canadian radio station
- Cincinnati and Hamilton County Public Library, Ohio, US
- Columbia Heights Public Library, Minnesota, US
