= James D. La Belle =

United States Marine Corps Medal of Honor recipient (1925–1945)

James Dennis La Belle
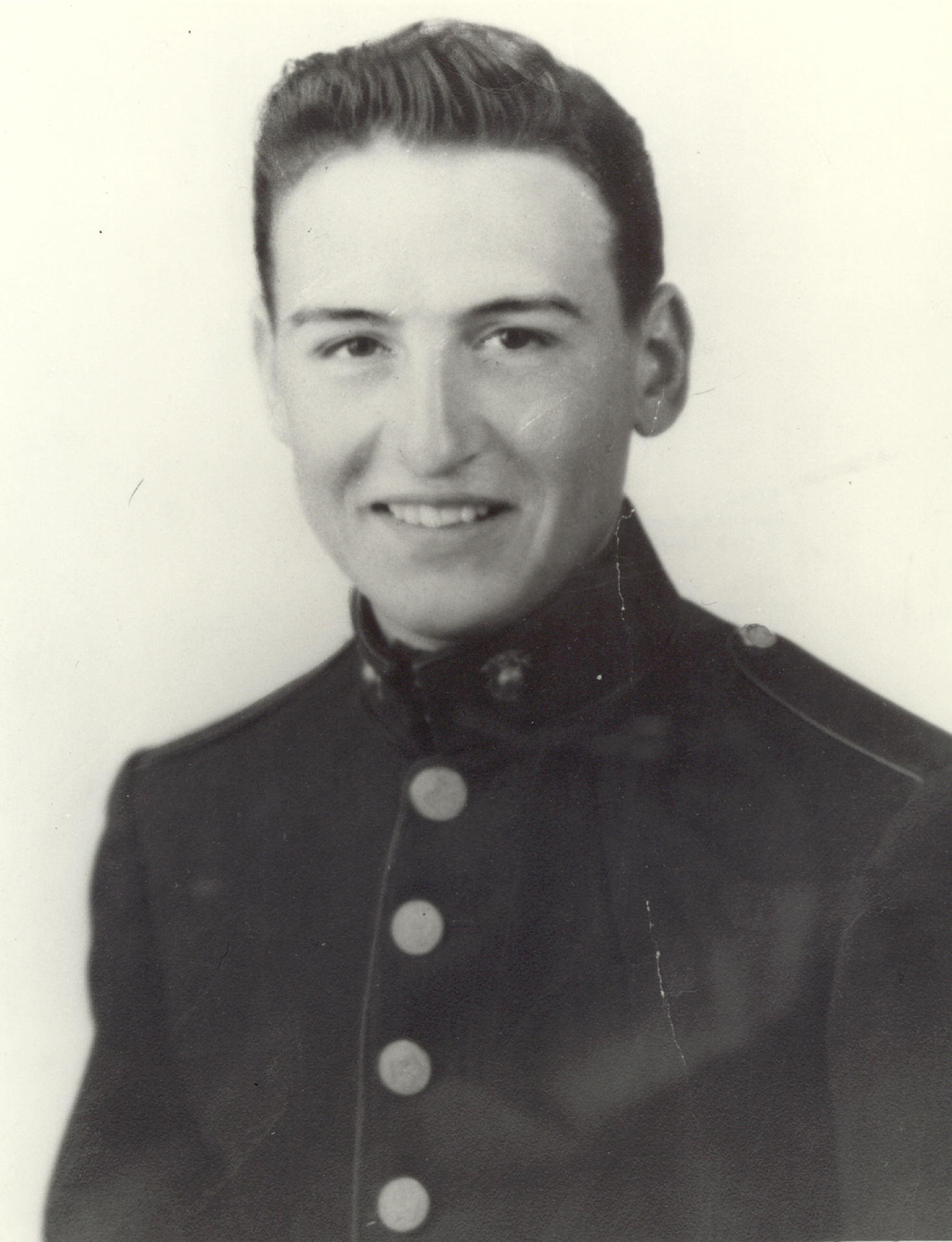
- James D. La Belle, Medal of Honor recipient
- Born: November 22, 1925; Columbia Heights, Minnesota
- Died: March 8, 1945 (aged 19); Iwo Jima, Volcano Islands, Japanese Empire
- Burial place: Fort Snelling National Cemetery, Fort Snelling, Minnesota
- Military career
- Allegiance: United States of America
- Branch: United States Marine Corps
- Service years: 1943–1945
- Rank: Private First Class
- Units: 27th Marine Regiment, 5th Marine Division
- Conflicts: World War II; Battle of Iwo Jima †
- Awards: Medal of Honor; Purple Heart

Private First Class James Dennis La Belle (November 22, 1925 – March 8, 1945) enlisted in the United States Marine Corps Reserve on November 18, 1943. Fifteen months later, in his first and last battle, he heroically sacrificed his life at Iwo Jima and was posthumously awarded the Medal of Honor, the highest military honor awarded by the United States.

== Early years ==
James La Belle was born in Columbia Heights, Minnesota on November 22, 1925. He attended grammar school in his neighborhood in Minneapolis and, in his spare time, played basketball and baseball. His spare time favorite was the raising of homing pigeons. At Columbia Heights High School he starred on the basketball, baseball and boxing teams, while following a vocational course in woodwork and metalwork. During summer vacations he worked as an apprentice acetylene welder for a local air conditioning corporation.

== Marine Corps service ==
At age 17, with his mother's permission, La Belle enlisted in the United States Marine Corps Reserve in Minneapolis. Recruit training at the MCRD San Diego, California, followed. After completing boot camp, he went to Camp Pendleton, California, where he qualified in the intensive combat training course before embarking for overseas. On June 30, 1944, he joined the regimental Weapons Company, 27th Marines, 5th Marine Division. The following August he sailed on board the USS George F. Elliott, bound for Hilo, Hawaii, and eventually the lava ash shores of Iwo Jima.

At Camp Tarawa, a Marine camp in Hawaii near Hilo, the regimental Weapons Company engaged in more training preparatory to actual combat.

On February 19, 1945, after aerial and naval forces had pounded its desolate surface for many days, the island of Iwo Jima felt the sting of the invading Marine amphibious forces. One of thousands, PFC La Belle fought continuously from the initial landing until March 8, 1945, when he was killed in action.

His mother was presented the Medal of Honor by BGen William E. Riley, then Director of Marine Corps Public Information, in ceremonies on July 21, 1946, in Minneapolis.

Private First Class La Belle's remains were returned to the United States in late 1948, and were reinterred in Fort Snelling National Cemetery.

== Medal of Honor citation ==
The President of the United States takes pride in presenting the MEDAL OF HONOR posthumously to

PRIVATE FIRST CLASS JAMES D. LA BELLE
UNITED STATES MARINE CORPS RESERVE

for service as set forth in the following CITATION:

For conspicuous gallantry and intrepidity at the risk of his life above and beyond the call of duty while serving with the Weapons Company, twenty-seventh Marines, Fifth Marine Division, in action against enemy Japanese forces during the seizure of Iwo Jima in the Volcano Islands, 8 March 1945. Filling a gap in the front lines during a critical phase of the battle, Private First Class LaBelle had dug into a foxhole with two other Marines and grimly aware of the enemy's persistent attempts to blast a way through our lines with hand grenades, applied himself with steady concentration to maintaining a sharply vigilant watch during the hazardous night hours. Suddenly a hostile grenade landed beyond reach in his foxhole. Quickly estimating the situation, he determined to save the others if possible, shouted a warning and instantly dived on the missile, absorbing the exploding charge in his own body and thereby protecting his comrades from serious injury. Stouthearted and indomitable, he had unhesitatingly relinquished his own chance of survival that his fellow Marines might carry on the relentless fight against a fanatic enemy and, his dauntless courage, cool decision and valiant spirit of self-sacrifice in the face of certain death reflect the highest credit upon Private First Class LaBelle and the United States Naval Service. He gallantly gave his life in the service of his country.

/S/ HARRY S. TRUMAN

== Awards and decorations ==

1st row	Medal of Honor		
2nd row	Purple Heart	Combat Action Ribbon	Presidential Unit Citation
3rd row	American Campaign Medal	Asiatic-Pacific Campaign Medal with one campaign star	World War II Victory Medal

== Memorial ==
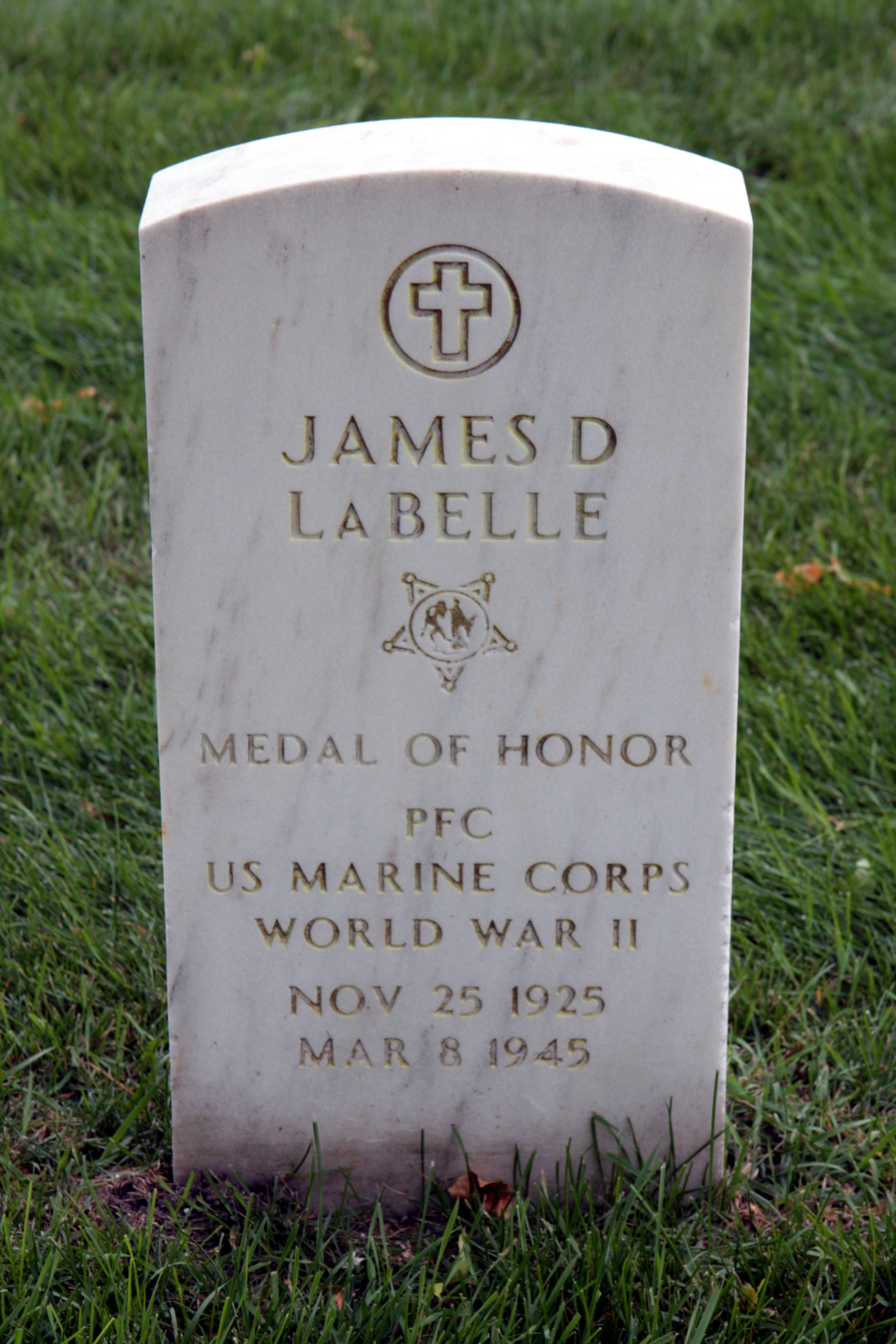
James D La Belle headstone in Fort Snelling National Cemetery

James D. La Belle is one of three Minnesota Medal of Honor recipients from the Northeast Twin Cities who are named on the Anoka County Veteran's memorial at Bunker Hills Anoka County Park in Coon Rapids, Minnesota. The other two are Richard E. Kraus and Richard K. Sorenson.

A municipal park in Columbia Heights, Minnesota is named in his honor.

LaBelle has been honored into Columbia Heights Public Schools' Alumni of Distinction in 2016. There is also a memorial for him near Columbia Heights High School.

== See also ==
- List of Medal of Honor recipients
- List of Medal of Honor recipients for World War II
- List of Medal of Honor recipients for the Battle of Iwo Jima
