= Robert J. Pruden =

United States Army soldier

Robert Joseph Pruden
- Army Medal of Honor
- Born: September 9, 1949; Saint Paul, Minnesota, US
- Died: November 20, 1969 (aged 20); Quang Ngai Province, Republic of Vietnam
- Burial place: Fort Snelling National Cemetery, Minneapolis, Minnesota
- Military career
- Allegiance: United States of America
- Branch: United States Army
- Service years: 1967–1969
- Rank: Staff Sergeant
- Units: 75th Ranger Infantry Regiment (Airborne), Americal Division
- Conflicts: Vietnam War †
- Awards: Medal of Honor; Purple Heart

Robert Joseph Pruden (September 9, 1949 – November 20, 1969) was a United States Army soldier and a recipient of the United States military's highest decoration—the Medal of Honor—for his actions in the Vietnam War.

== Biography ==
Pruden joined the Army from Minneapolis, Minnesota in 1967, and by the time of his death was serving as a staff sergeant in the 75th Ranger Infantry Regiment (Airborne), Americal Division. On that day, in Quang Ngai Province of the Republic of Vietnam, Pruden was killed in a firefight with enemy forces. For his actions during the battle, he was posthumously awarded the Medal of Honor on November 20, 1969.

Pruden, aged 20 at his death, was buried in Fort Snelling National Cemetery, Minneapolis, Minnesota.

== Medal of Honor citation ==
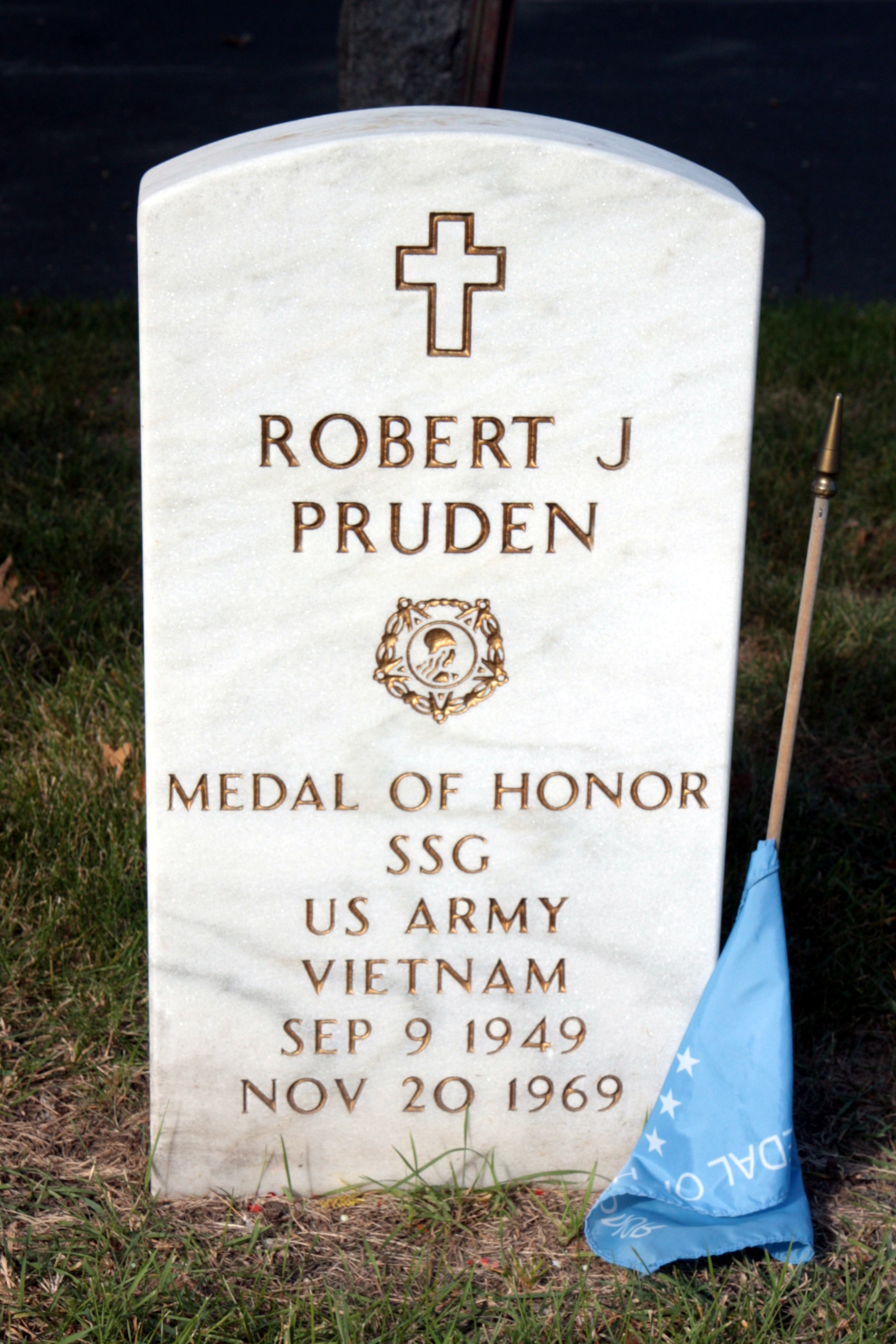
Pruden's grave marker at Fort Snelling National Cemetery

Staff Sergeant Pruden's official Medal of Honor citation reads:

For conspicuous gallantry and intrepidity in action at the risk of his life above and beyond the call of duty. S/Sgt. Pruden, Company G, distinguished himself while serving as a reconnaissance team leader during an ambush mission. The 6-man team was inserted by helicopter into enemy-controlled territory to establish an ambush position and to obtain information concerning enemy movements. As the team moved into the preplanned area, S/Sgt. Pruden deployed his men into 2 groups on the opposite sides of a well used trail. As the groups were establishing their defensive positions, 1 member of the team was trapped in the open by the heavy fire from an enemy squad. Realizing that the ambush position had been compromised, S/Sgt. Pruden directed his team to open fire on the enemy force. Immediately, the team came under heavy fire from a second enemy element. S/Sgt. Pruden, with full knowledge of the extreme danger involved, left his concealed position and, firing as he ran, advanced toward the enemy to draw the hostile fire. He was seriously wounded twice but continued his attack until he fell for a third time, in front of the enemy positions. S/Sgt. Pruden's actions resulted in several enemy casualties and withdrawal of the remaining enemy force. Although grievously wounded, he directed his men into defensive positions and called for evacuation helicopters, which safely withdrew the members of the team. S/Sgt. Pruden's outstanding courage, selfless concern for the welfare of his men, and intrepidity in action at the cost of his life were in keeping with the highest traditions of the military service and reflect great credit upon himself, his unit, and the U.S. Army.

== See also ==
- List of Medal of Honor recipients
- List of Medal of Honor recipients for the Vietnam War
