= Columbia Heights, Minnesota =

City in Minnesota, United States

Columbia Heights
- City
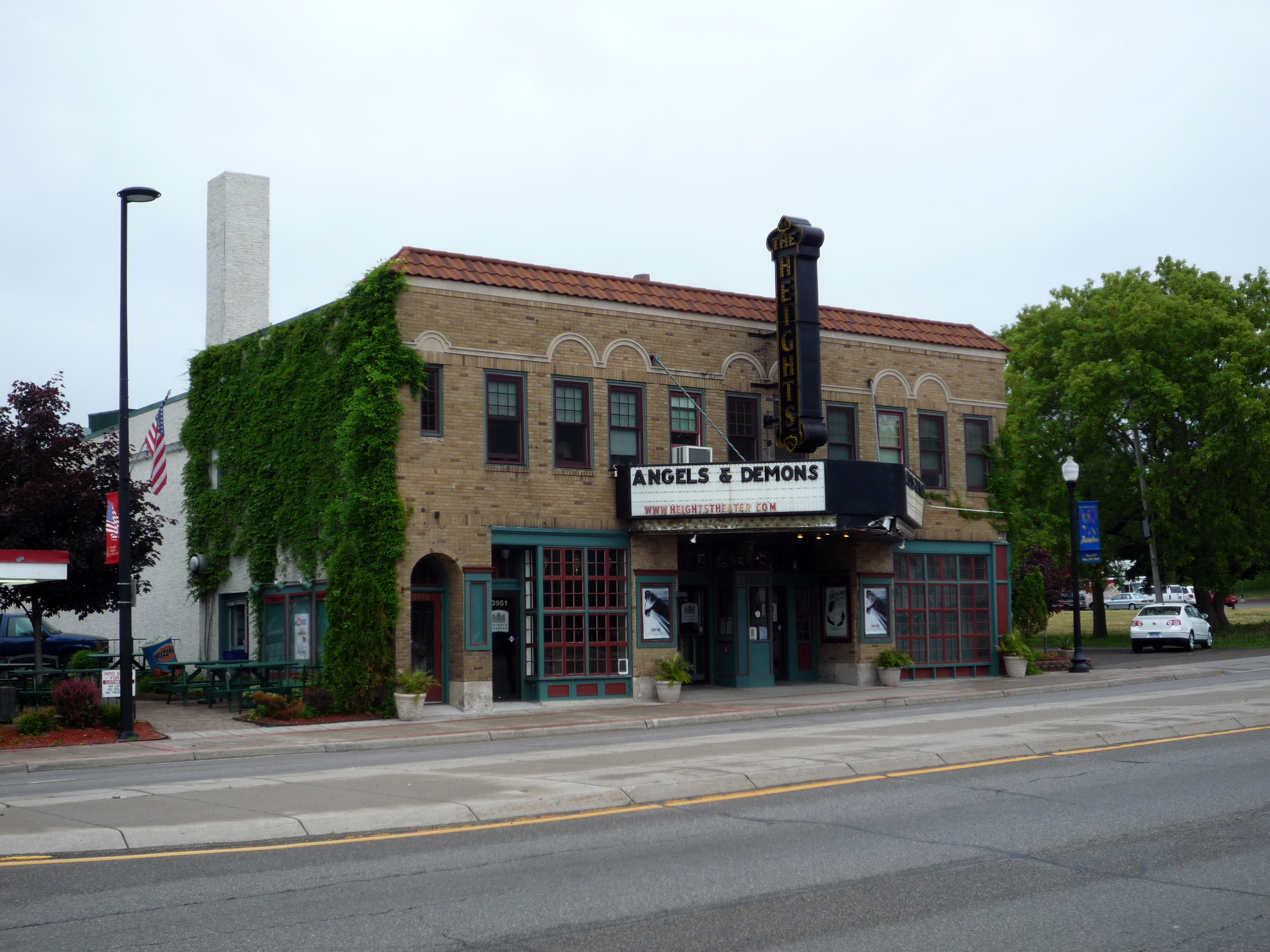
- The Heights Theater is a local landmark
- Nicknames: CoHi, Heights
- Interactive map of Columbia Heights
- Coordinates: 45°02′54″N 93°15′12″W
- Country: United States
- State: Minnesota
- County: Anoka
- Formed as a village: March 14, 1898
- Incorporated as a city: July 21, 1921

Government
  - Mayor: Amáda Márquez Simula
  - City Manager: Aaron Chirpich

Area
  - Total: 3.52 sq mi (9.11 km^{2})
  - Land: 3.41 sq mi (8.83 km^{2})
  - Water: 0.11 sq mi (0.28 km^{2}) 3.13%
- Elevation: 912 ft (278 m)

Population (2020)
  - Total: 21,973
  - Estimate (2022): 22,243
  - Density: 6,447.9/sq mi (2,489.55/km^{2})
- Time zone: UTC-6 (Central (CST))
  - Summer (DST): UTC-5 (CDT)
- ZIP code: 55421
- Area code: 763
- FIPS code: 27-12700
- GNIS feature ID: 2393607
- Website: columbiaheightsmn.gov

Columbia Heights is a city in Anoka County, Minnesota, United States. The population was 21,973 at the 2020 census.

Minnesota State Highways 47 (University Avenue) and 65 (Central Avenue) are two of the main routes in the city.

Columbia Heights is a first-ring northern suburb of Minneapolis, which borders it on the south. Its downtown district is centered at the intersection of 40th Avenue NE and Central Avenue, and includes the Heights Theater, county offices, the Public Library, and a variety of businesses. Central Avenue forms a commercial district along its length. More businesses also line University Avenue.

== Geography ==
According to the United States Census Bureau, the city has a total area of 3.52 square miles (9.12 km^{2}), of which 3.41 square miles (8.83 km^{2}) is land and 0.11 square miles (0.28 km^{2}) is water.

Columbia Heights is bordered by the city of Fridley to the north and west; New Brighton and Saint Anthony to the east; and Minneapolis to the south.

The city of Hilltop is entirely enclosed within the city.

Columbia Heights has a hilly terrain and features one of the highest points in Hennepin, Ramsey, and Anoka Counties along Stinson Boulevard between Fairway Drive and 45th Avenue NE/County Road E. There are five lakes in the city, which include Sullivan Lake, Highland Lake, Silver Lake, Hart Lake, and LaBelle Pond.

The city park system resides in mostly low lying and former swampland areas that was unsuitable for building. Huset Park is the main park in the city. Prestemon, Gauvitte and McKenna Parks were all named for members of the first city council in 1921. Ava Ostrander, first woman elected to the council in 1924, also has a park named for her. Kordiak Park is an Anoka County park in the city named after former County Commissioner Albert A. Kordiak. Other parks include Edgemoor, La Belle, Lomianki, Keyes, Sullivan, Ramsdell, and Hilltop.

== History ==
Columbia Heights was formed as a village on March 14, 1898, when it separated from the former Fridley Township. On July 21, 1921, the Charter of the City of Columbia Heights was adopted and the city was formed.

A Polish flag and white eagle are on the sign marking the border between Columbia Heights and Minneapolis, visible when entering Columbia Heights on Central Avenue, in celebration of the suburb's early roots as a Polish–American community. In 1991, Columbia Heights joined Sister Cities International and selected Łomianki, Poland as its Sister City. In 1944, a plane of Allied flyers was shot down during the Warsaw uprising, near Łomianki. The brother of a longtime Columbia Heights resident was on that mission. In 1987, the people of Łomianki erected a monument in memory of the American flyers who lost their lives. Because of this personal connection Łomianki was selected as the Sister City.

Abraham Lincoln's funeral car was bought by Thomas Lowry who restored it and featured it at a number of exhibitions throughout the country. When not in use, it was stored in Columbia Heights but was destroyed by a fire on March 18, 1911.

In 2016, Columbia Heights was honored with the All-American City Award according to the National Civic League.

In 2023, Columbia Heights formed a second Sister City with Galdogob, Somalia for its growing and significant Somali American population.

== Education ==
Columbia Heights is served by public schools, private schools, and charter schools.

All residents are in the Columbia Heights Public School District (Independent School District 13).

=== Independent School District 13 ===
- Columbia Heights High School (CHHS): grades 9–12
- Columbia Academy (CA): grades 6–8
- Highland Elementary: grades K–5
- Valley View Elementary: grades K–5
- North Park Elementary: grades K–5
- Early Childhood Programs: Birth–5 years

=== NE Metro Intermediate District 916 ===
- ALC West Campus: grades 7–12

=== Private schools ===
- Immaculate Conception Catholic School: grades K–8
- Little Voyageurs Montessori School: grades PreK–K

=== Charter schools ===
- Academy of Bioscience: grades 5–8
- Bultum Academy: grades PreK - 8

=== Higher education ===
NEI College of Technology was located in Columbia Heights until it merged with Dunwoody College of Technology in 2003. The college building was demolished in November 2004.

== Notable people ==
- John Alt, former Kansas City Chiefs NFL and University of Iowa football player, was raised and went to school in Columbia Heights.
- Earl Bakken, inventor of the first external, battery-operated, transistorized, wearable artificial pacemaker, founder of Medtronic.
- Don Carlson, professional basketball player.
- Jalue Dorje, the eighth reincarnation of the Tibetan lama Terchen Taksham Rinpoche
- James D. La Belle, Medal of Honor recipient, was raised and went to school in Columbia Heights.
- Pat Proft, screenwriter and movie producer, was raised and went to school in Columbia Heights.
- Henry Scholberg, librarian and bibliographer.
- Edward J. Tomczyk, Minnesota state representative.

== Demographics ==
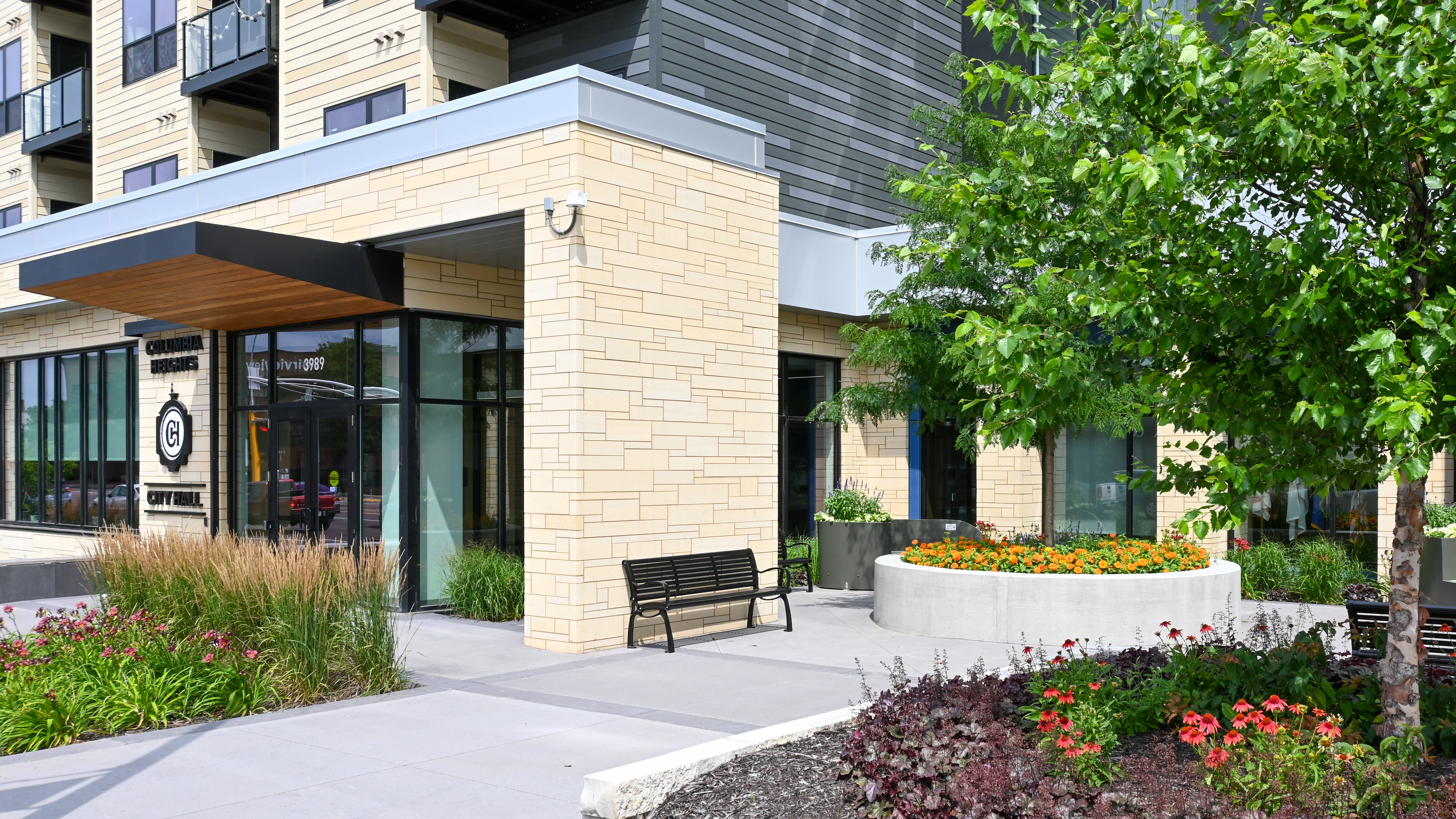
Columbia Heights City Hall

Historical population
Census	Pop.	Note	%±
1900	123		—
1910	590		379.7%
1920	2,968		403.1%
1930	5,613		89.1%
1940	6,035		7.5%
1950	8,175		35.5%
1960	17,533		114.5%
1970	23,997		36.9%
1980	20,029		−16.5%
1990	18,910		−5.6%
2000	18,520		−2.1%
2010	19,496		5.3%
2020	21,973		12.7%
2022 (est.)	22,243		1.2%
U.S. Decennial Census; 2020 Census

=== 2020 census ===
As of the 2020 census, Columbia Heights had a population of 21,973. The median age was 36.9 years. 23.2% of residents were under the age of 18 and 15.0% of residents were 65 years of age or older. For every 100 females there were 98.4 males, and for every 100 females age 18 and over there were 96.2 males age 18 and over.

100.0% of residents lived in urban areas, while 0.0% lived in rural areas.

There were 8,777 households in Columbia Heights, of which 27.8% had children under the age of 18 living in them. Of all households, 35.7% were married-couple households, 24.0% were households with a male householder and no spouse or partner present, and 31.9% were households with a female householder and no spouse or partner present. About 35.3% of all households were made up of individuals and 14.1% had someone living alone who was 65 years of age or older.

There were 9,227 housing units, of which 4.9% were vacant. The homeowner vacancy rate was 1.0% and the rental vacancy rate was 6.4%.

Racial composition as of the 2020 census
Race	Number	Percent
White	11,820	53.8%
Black or African American	4,755	21.6%
American Indian and Alaska Native	376	1.7%
Asian	1,183	5.4%
Native Hawaiian and Other Pacific Islander	15	0.1%
Some other race	1,999	9.1%
Two or more races	1,825	8.3%
Hispanic or Latino (of any race)	3,246	14.8%

=== 2010 census ===
As of the census of 2010, there were 19,496 people, 7,926 households, and 4,558 families residing in the city. The population density was 5,717.3 inhabitants per square mile (2,207.5/km^{2}). There were 8,584 housing units at an average density of 2,517.3 units per square mile (971.9 units/km^{2}). The racial makeup of the city was 69.7% White, 13.5% African American, 1.5% Native American, 4.8% Asian, 0.1% Pacific Islander, 6.2% from other races, and 4.3% from two or more races. Hispanic or Latino of any race were 11.9% of the population.

There were 7,926 households, of which 27.7% had children under the age of 18 living with them, 38.5% were married couples living together, 13.0% had a female householder with no husband present, 6.0% had a male householder with no wife present, and 42.5% were non-families. 34.5% of all households were made up of individuals, and 13.4% had someone living alone who was 65 years of age or older. The average household size was 2.44 and the average family size was 3.15.

The median age in the city was 36.9 years. 22.9% of residents were under the age of 18; 8.1% were between the ages of 18 and 24; 29.2% were from 25 to 44; 24.5% were from 45 to 64; and 15.5% were 65 years of age or older. The gender makeup of the city was 48.5% male and 51.5% female.

=== 2000 census ===
As of the census of 2000, there were 18,520 people, 8,033 households, and 4,731 families residing in the city. The population density was 5,368.7 inhabitants per square mile (2,072.9/km^{2}). There were 8,151 housing units at an average density of 2,362.9 units per square mile (912.3 units/km^{2}). The racial makeup of the city was 87.39% White, 3.62% African American, 1.64% Native American, 3.46% Asian, 0.01% Pacific Islander, 1.30% from other races, and 2.59% from two or more races. Hispanic or Latino of any race were 3.15% of the population.

There were 8,033 households, out of which 23.8% had children under the age of 18 living with them, 43.2% were married couples living together, 11.0% had a female householder with no husband present, and 41.1% were non-families. 34.0% of all households were made up of individuals, and 15.2% had someone living alone who was 65 years of age or older. The average household size was 2.29 and the average family size was 2.93.

In the city, the age distribution of the population shows 20.8% under the age of 18, 8.6% from 18 to 24, 30.0% from 25 to 44, 21.9% from 45 to 64, and 18.7% who were 65 years of age or older. The median age was 39 years. For every 100 females, there were 92.3 males. For every 100 females age 18 and over, there were 90.1 males.

The median income for a household in the city was $40,562, and the median income for a family was $50,610. Males had a median income of $35,092 versus $28,993 for females. The per capita income for the city was $21,368. About 3.9% of families and 6.4% of the population were below the poverty line, including 8.6% of those under age 18 and 5.6% of those age 65 or over.
