= Donald Rudolph =

United States Army Medal of Honor recipient (1921–2006)

Donald Eugene Rudolph Sr.
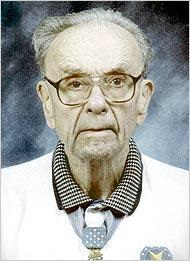
- SGT Donald Rudolph
- Born: February 21, 1921; South Haven, Minnesota, US
- Died: May 25, 2006 (aged 85); Grand Rapids, Minnesota, US
- Burial place: Fort Snelling National Cemetery, Minneapolis, Minnesota
- Military career
- Allegiance: United States of America
- Branch: United States Army
- Service years: 1941–1963
- Rank: Second Lieutenant
- Units: 2nd Battalion, 20th Infantry Regiment, 6th Infantry Division
- Conflicts: World War II; Korean War
- Awards: Medal of Honor; Purple Heart
- Other work: Veterans Administration

Donald Eugene Rudolph Sr. (February 21, 1921 – May 25, 2006) was an American soldier who received his country's highest military honor, the Medal of Honor, in World War II.

== Biography ==
He was awarded the medal while serving as a technical sergeant and acting as leader of his platoon on Luzon island in the northern Philippines; his actions took place on February 5, 1945.

While giving first aid to wounded men on the battlefield, Rudolph noticed that his unit was pinned down by Japanese gunfire from a ditch. Crawling to the ditch, using his rifle and grenades to protect himself, he then killed three enemy soldiers concealed there. He then continued to work his way across open ground to a line of pillboxes that were also firing and immobilising his company.

He threw a grenade into the firing slit in the first of the pillboxes, charged toward it and threw another grenade into the structure, killing the enemy machine gunners and silencing their fire. After ordering several riflemen to cover his advance, he proceeded to attack and neutralise seven further pillboxes in quick succession.

Later, when an enemy tank attacked his platoon, he advanced under covering fire, opened its hatch and dropped a white phosphorus grenade inside, killing the crew and negating its threat. His medal citation concludes that through "his outstanding heroism, superb courage, and leadership, and complete disregard for his own safety, [...] Rudolph cleared a path for an advance which culminated in one of the most decisive victories of the Philippine campaign.".

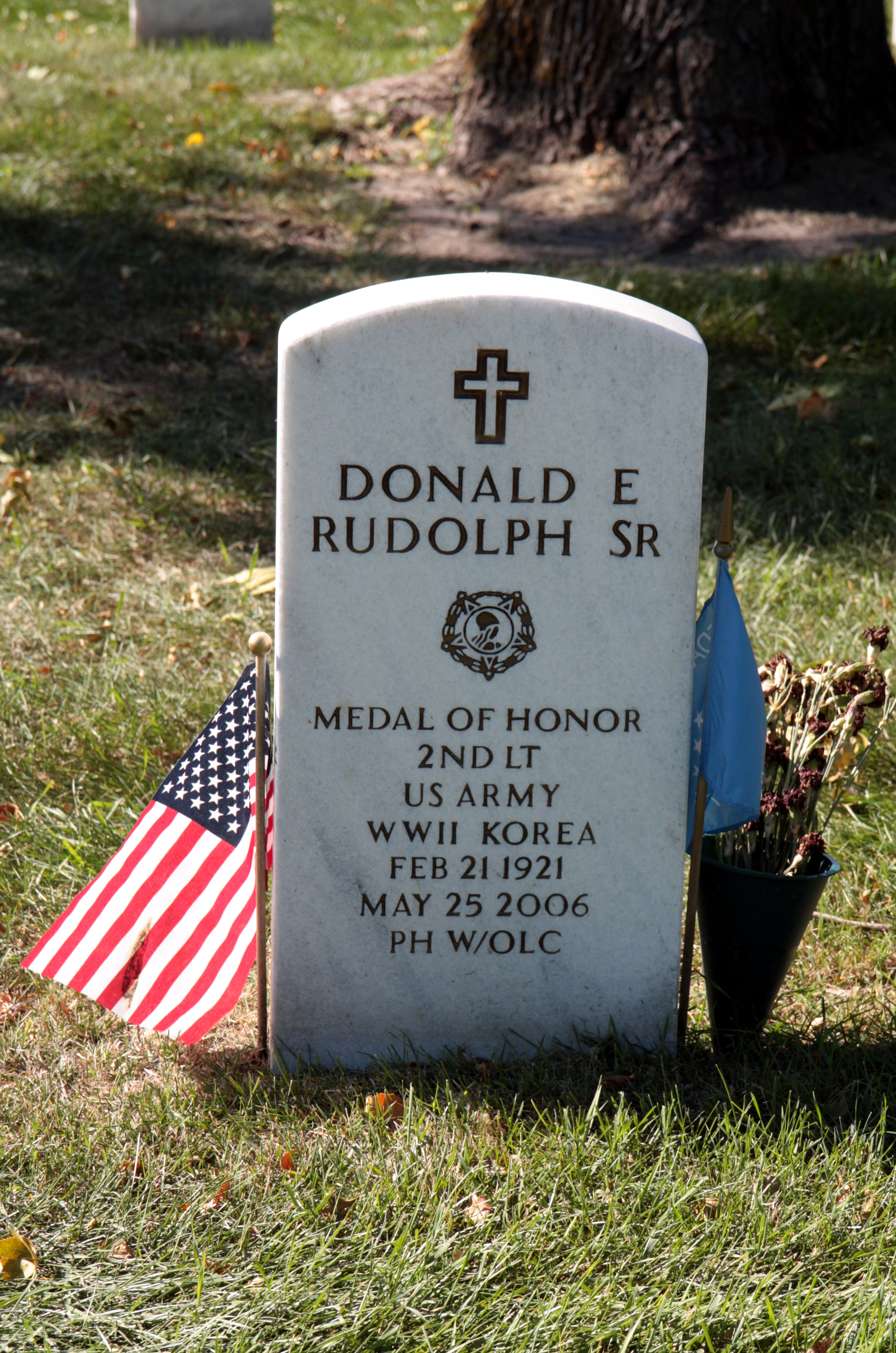
Donald E Rudolph Sr headstone in Fort Snelling National Cemetery

He was promoted to Second Lieutenant after the battle, and was presented with the medal on August 23, 1945, by President Harry S. Truman. He continued his army career in the reserves until 1963, then worked in the Veterans Administration until his retirement in 1976.

Rudolph died from complications of Alzheimer's disease on May 25, 2006, in Grand Rapids, Minnesota. He is buried at Fort Snelling National Cemetery Minneapolis, Minnesota.

Highway 7 north from US Highway 169 in Taconite, Minnesota to Bigfork, Minnesota is known as the Donald Rudolph Medal of Honor Scenic Byway. A commemorative site is available several miles up the highway.

== Awards and Decorations ==

Badge	Combat Infantryman Badge		
1st row	Medal of Honor		
	Bronze Star Medal Retroactively Awarded, 1947	Purple Heart	Army Good Conduct Medal
2nd row	American Defense Service Medal	American Campaign Medal	Asiatic-Pacific Campaign Medal with Arrowhead Device and 2 Campaign stars
3rd row	World War II Victory Medal	National Defense Service Medal with 1 Oak leaf cluster	Philippine Liberation Medal
Unit awards	Presidential Unit Citation		Philippine Presidential Unit Citation

6th Infantry Division Insignia

== See also ==
- List of Medal of Honor recipients
- List of Medal of Honor recipients for World War II
