= Columbia Heights Public Library =

Library in Minnesota, United States

- 45°2′26.9″N 93°15′1.23″W
- Location: Columbia Heights and Anoka County, Minnesota, United States
- Type: Public
- Established: December 3, 1928

Collection
- Size: 69,702

Access and use
- Circulation: 120,705
- Population served: 19,496

Other information
- Budget: $798,375
- Director: Renee Dougherty (acting)
- Employees: 22
- Website: www.chplmn.org

The Columbia Heights Public Library has served the City of Columbia Heights since 1928. The Library is at 3939 Central Ave, Columbia Heights, Anoka County, Minnesota, United States. Columbia Heights is a first ring suburb of Minneapolis and serves the greater communities of Anoka, Hennepin and Ramsey Counties. The Columbia Heights Public Library is a city-owned library funded by a city library levy. It is one of five city owned and operated libraries in the Metropolitan Library Service Agency (MELSA) including Bayport, South St. Paul, Saint Paul, and Stillwater.

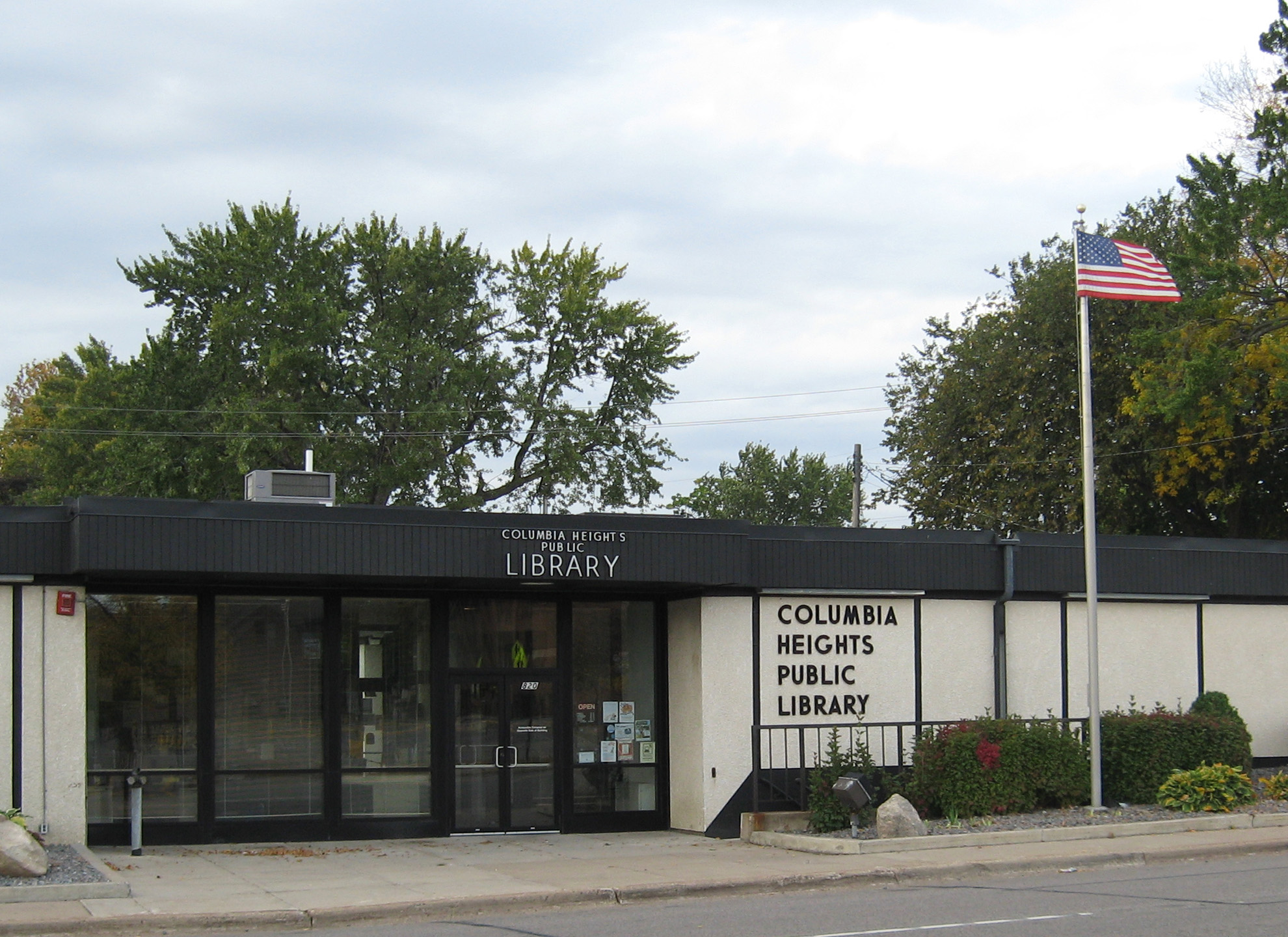
CHPL 2011

== History ==
The Columbia Heights Public Library opened its doors for the first time on December 3, 1928, at 3949 Central Ave N.E., on the main level of the Heights Theater, and later moved to the second floor.

CHPL 1928

The previous month the Silver Lake School Mothers' Club, with President Harriet Blythe, decided the City of Columbia Heights needed a public library since it was opening its first public high school. Members of the club canvassed the neighborhoods on foot with children's wagons to solicit donations of books, magazines, and furniture. On November 17, 1928, Margaret Thomas, a high school teacher, agreed to head the first Library Board. In 1938, the library moved to the second floor of a building at 4002 Central Ave. The library moved to 828 40th Ave, and became the "War Information Center" in 1941.

CHPL 1941

The library, located in a rented building at 838 40th Ave N.E., was recognized by the City Council as a department of the city in 1952, when it celebrated its 25th anniversary.

CHPL 1953

The Library moved in 1960 to 820 40th Ave NE, and the first professional librarian was hired. In 1966, the Library obtained an LSCA (Library Services and Construction Act) grant and a Civil Defense grant to fund an addition to the original building. The building housed the library on the first floor and the City Civil Defense program in the lower level. In 1971, the Library negotiated to join the newly created MELSA through a contract with the Anoka County Library. The contract provided reciprocal borrowing and returns, and inter-library loans. In 1971, the Civil Defense area of the building was taken over by the library and remodeled to house the Children's Department and activity room. In 1979, The Friends of the Library were reorganized after a hiatus of several years, with Helen Merrick as the president. The Columbia Heights Friends are individuals and families who support services and programs at the library. The Friends provide financial support for materials and services, and host special library events.

Over the next several years the library made technological advances with a materials security system installed in 1984, automation of the circulation system in 1987, an online public catalog in 1992, public Internet access provided in 1997 (graphics available in 2000), and a web-based catalog activated in 1998. In 1994, the building was brought up to full ADA compliance by installing an elevator, handicapped accessible restroom, ADA compliant signage and furniture. The ADA compliance project utilized CDBG (Community Development Block Grant) funds. The membrane roofing was replaced with a built-up tar and shingle product, and all computer wiring was upgraded to category 5 cable in 1999. In 2001, the public access terminals were replaced with PCs and the circulation terminals were replaced in 2002. In 2009, the Library received a Gates Online Opportunity Hardware grant from the Bill and Melinda Gates Foundation for public use computers. Also in 2009, the Library received a "Picturing America" grant from the National Endowment for the Arts which included photographic reproductions of famous American works of art, an After School Community Learning Grant for programing, a 21st Century grant for programing, and a Dollar General literacy Foundation grant for materials. In 2016, the library moved into a newly-constructed building at 3939 Central Avenue Northeast. The building was designed by HGA Architects and built by Ebert Construction.

== Library Groups ==
=== The Columbia Heights Library Board ===
The Library Board was established in 1928 as the governing body to supervise policy, programs, budget, the physical library, and staffing.

=== The Friends of the Library ===
The Columbia Heights Friends of the Library are individuals and families who support the library through the provision of materials, equipment, and volunteer time.

=== The Library Foundation ===
The Columbia Heights Library Foundation is a non-profit organization created in 2001 and their mission is “to generate financial support for enhancement of library facilities and services through community partnerships.”
