= Fort Snelling National Cemetery =

Veterans cemetery in Hennepin County, Minnesota

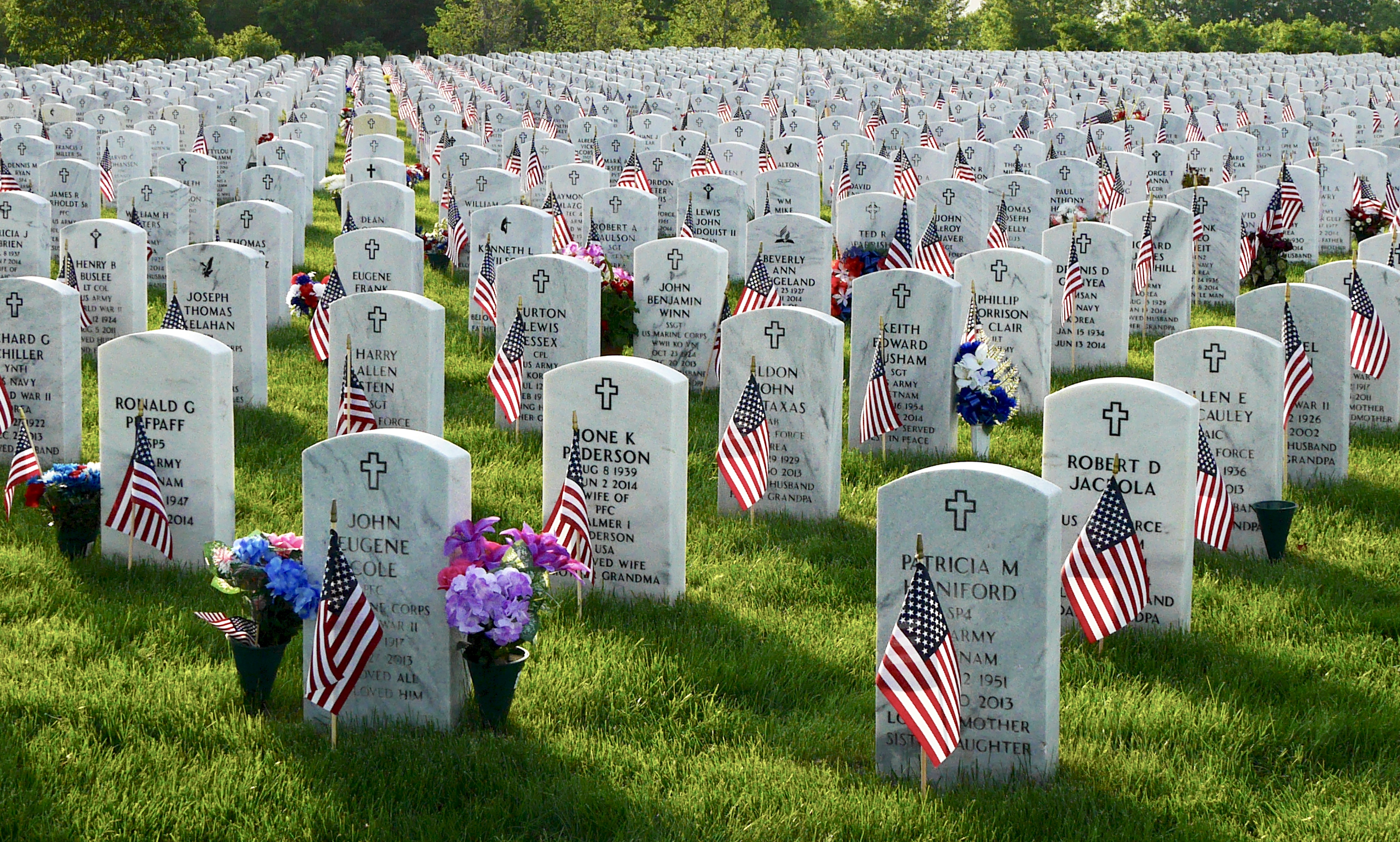
- Memorial Day 2018 at Fort Snelling National Cemetery
- Interactive map of Fort Snelling National Cemetery

Details
- Established: 1939
- Location: Fort Snelling Unorganized Territory, Minnesota
- Country: United States
- Coordinates: 44°52′15″N 93°13′11″W
- Type: Public
- Size: 436.3 acres (176.6 ha)
- No. of graves: >260,000
- Website: Official
- Find a Grave: Fort Snelling National Cemetery

Fort Snelling National Cemetery is a United States National Cemetery located in the Fort Snelling Unorganized Territory adjacent to the historic fort and Minneapolis–Saint Paul International Airport. It is the only National Cemetery in Minnesota. Administered by the United States Department of Veterans Affairs, it covers 436.3 acres (176.6 ha), and as of June, 2024 had over 260,000 interments. It was listed on the National Register of Historic Places in 2016.

== History ==
Fort Snelling was a frontier fort first established in 1819. Its original purpose was to keep the peace on what was then the western frontier. During the American Civil War it served as a recruiting camp area for Minnesota volunteers. The cemetery was officially established in 1870.

In 1937, the citizens of St. Paul petitioned Congress to construct a National Cemetery in the area. Members of veterans groups, such as the Veterans of Foreign Wars, Disabled American Veterans, Jewish War Veterans, and the American Legion, worked together to establish the national military cemetery. The effort began with Theresa Ericksen, who fell on the ice in 1935 when visiting with other veterans. F.W. Pederson, who was commandant of the Veterans home in which Ericksen lived, asked Ericksen where she would like to be buried. Ericksen replied, "In the old post cemetery at Fort Snelling." Through letters to Ernest Lundeen and others, they came up with the idea of a Minnesota national cemetery. A committee was formed made up of veterans, including Ericksen. Soon, cemetery construction began.

Two years later, the new plot was dedicated, and the burials from the original post cemetery were moved to it. In 1960, the Fort Snelling Air Force Station transferred 146 acres (59 ha) to the cemetery; another 177 acres (0.72 km^{2}) were acquired in 1961, expanding the cemetery to its current size.

There was a tradition of placing a flag on every grave on Memorial Day, but as the cemetery grew, the staff was forced to stop. In 2017, the nonprofit Flags for Fort Snelling revived the tradition; volunteers placed 200,000 memorial flags in 2019.

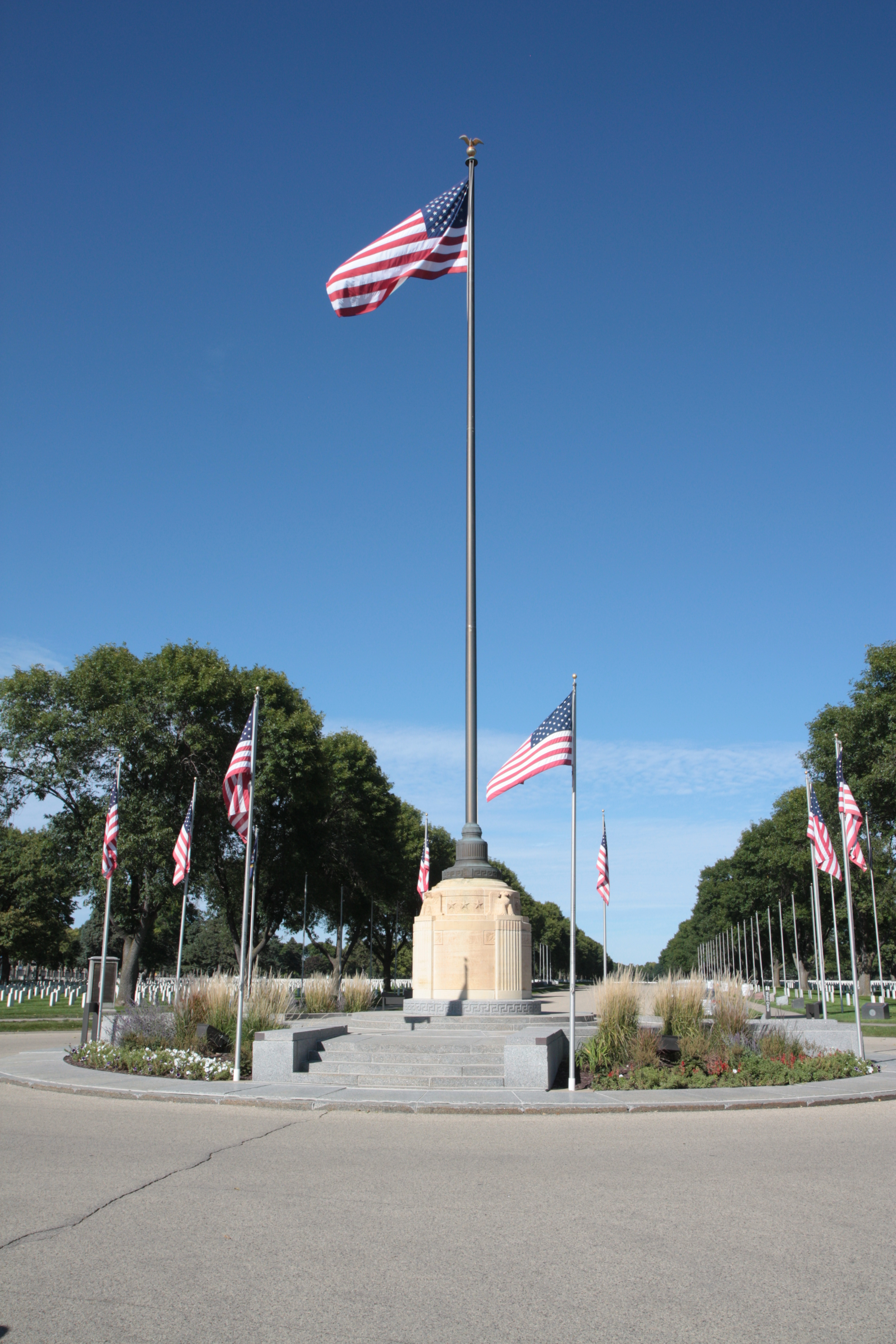
Flag Posts at Fort Snelling National Cemetery

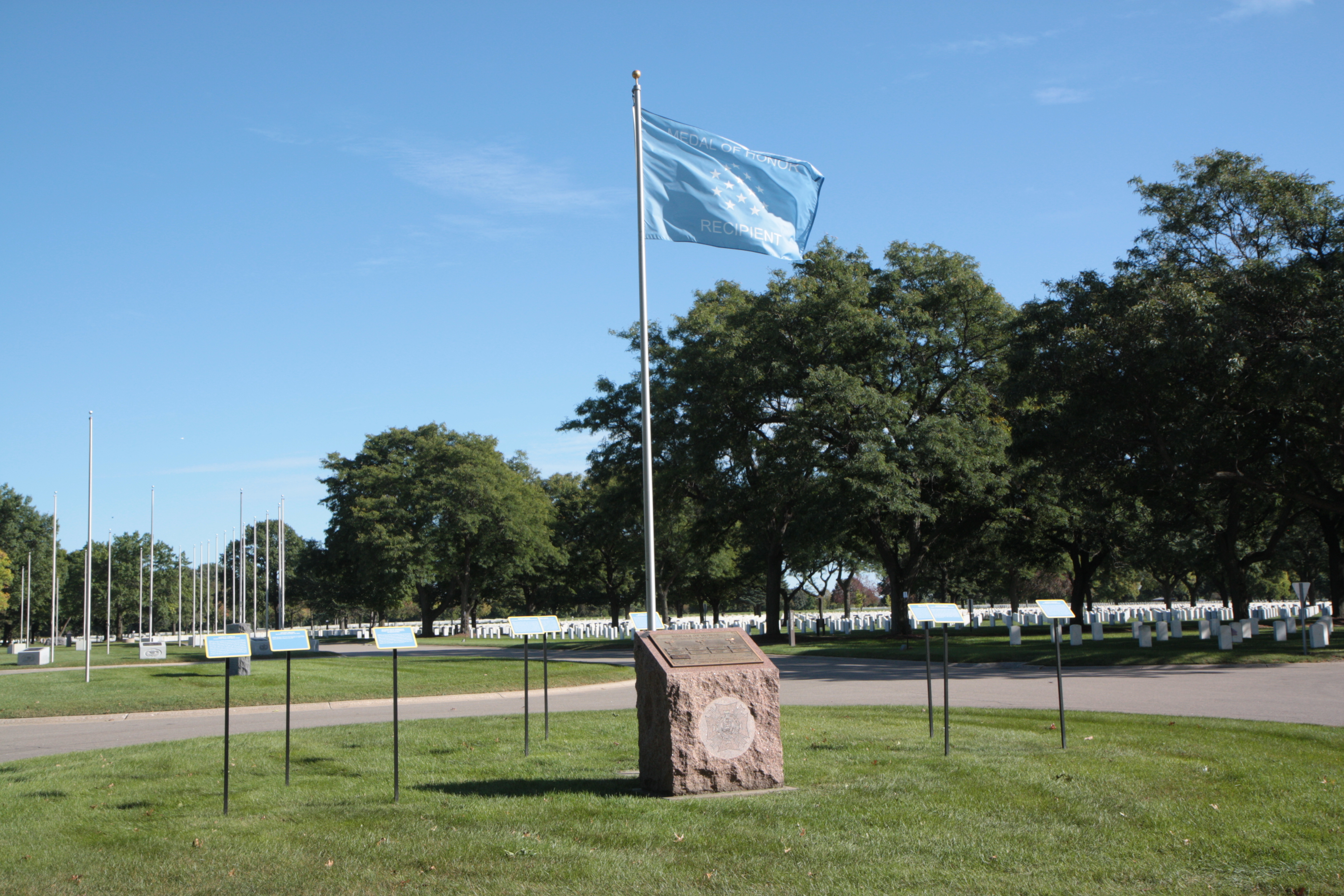
Medal of Honor Flag Post

== Notable interments ==
=== Medal of Honor recipients ===
- Second Lieutenant Donald E. Rudolph Sr., US Army, Medal of Honor recipient for action in the Battle of Luzon in World War II
- Captain Richard E. Fleming, USMC, for action at Midway in World War II (cenotaph, body was not recovered)
- Private First Class Richard E. Kraus, USMC, for action at Peleliu in World War II
- Private First Class James D. LaBelle, USMC, for action at the Battle of Iwo Jima during World War II
- Captain Arlo Olson, US Army, for action in Italy during World War II
- Staff Sergeant Robert J. Pruden, US Army, for action in the Vietnam War
- First Lieutenant Richard Keith Sorenson, USMC, for action on Kwajalein during World War II
- Captain George H. Mallon, US Army, for actions in France during World War I
- Machinist Mate First Class Oscar F. Nelson, US Navy, for heroism aboard the USS Bennington during peacetime

=== Other ===
- Johnny Blanchard, baseball player
- Thomas Edward Burnett Jr, United Airlines Flight 93 passenger
- Bob Casey, baseball announcer
- Theresa Ericksen, U.S. army nurse and influential in the founding of the cemetery
- Mark H. Gehan, Minnesota state representative, mayor of Saint Paul
- Frank Eugene Hook, US Congressman
- Jim Klobuchar, Minnesota journalist and author
- Dr. C. Walton Lillehei, pioneer of modern open-heart surgery
- Corporal Charles W. Lindberg, last surviving member of the Marines who raised the flag on Iwo Jima during World War II
- Ernest Lundeen, US Congressman and Senator
- John Mariucci, hockey coach, member of the United States Hockey Hall of Fame
- Private Tracie McBride, rape and murder victim
- Hal Scott, sports announcer
- Bruce P. Smith, football player, 1941 Heisman Trophy winner
- Herbert J. Suerth, Replacement member of Easy Company 2/506th PIR, 101st Airborne Division, Band of Brothers
- David C. Sutherland III, game artist
- Major Tim Vakoc, US Army Chaplain mortally wounded in Mosul during the Iraq War
- John Clay Walker, American journalist, tortured and murdered in Mexico by members of the Guadalajara Cartel
- George J. Weiss, Jr., Presidential Citizens Medal recipient, founder of the Fort Snelling Memorial Rifle Squad

The cemetery contains one British Commonwealth war grave, of a Royal Canadian Air Force airman of World War II.
