= Minnesota Nurses Association =

American trade union

The Minnesota Nurses Association (MNA) is a labor union representing 22,000 registered nurses in the U.S. state of Minnesota. MNA represents the majority of bedside nurses in the state of Minnesota, as well as nurses in Wisconsin and Iowa. They are affiliated with National Nurses United, a national nurses union promoting guaranteed nurse-to-patient staffing ratios and single payer healthcare.

== Early history ==
The Minnesota Nurses Association began as the Ramsey County Graduate Nurses' Association (RCGNA) in 1898, founded by Theresa Ericksen and eight other nurses. The goal of the organization, which was the United States' first centralized nurse registry, was to "advance the standing and best interests of graduates [...] and to place the profession of nursing on the highest plane obtainable." The RCGNA was selective in who they allowed to become members. The membership had meetings where they shared best practices and presented papers, served as mentors to each other, and had access to a private library of major nursing journals. They also developed their own publications, which were distributed to training schools. In five years, there were 120 dues-paying members.

In 1903, the RCGNA sought to raise the professional standards of nursing in Minnesota through collective action, lobbying for a state registration system. This resulted in the Minnesota State Graduate Nurses’ Association (MSGNA), aiming for “the advancement of the nurses’ profession […] including the furtherance of the efficient care of the sick.” The MSGNA did not portray themselves as a trade union, and argued that their work was about raising standards of care. They turned to the legislature to achieve this goal.

In 1906, the MSGNA drafted a state registration bill, setting standards of who could use the title "registered nurse." Standards would be overseen by a State Examiners Board. The bill passed in 1907, and was signed into law by Governor John A. Johnson. Beginning in 1910, only nurses with board-approved training were eligible for registration in the MSGNA.

During World War I, nurses worked to support the nation's war efforts, with at least 90 members serving overseas. They also worked to support nurses during the 1918 influenza epidemic. Many associations, including the RCGNA consolidated into the Minnesota State Registered Nurses Association during this time.

== Strikes ==
On June 10, 2010, the MNA staged a one-day walkout strike to protest wage freezes and pension decreases, and to advocate for guaranteed nurse-to-patient staffing ratios. The MNA said it was the largest nurses strike in United States history, with more than 12,000 union members involved. On the morning of September 12, 2022, the MNA started staging a three-day strike involving around 15,000 nurses working in Minnesota across 16 hospitals over staffing shortages, being overworked, and low wages, making it the largest strike of nurses in the private sector in American history.
