= Edward J. Tomczyk =

American politician

Edward J. Tomczyk (December 13, 1917 – November 11, 1969) was an American politician.

Tomczyk was born in Columbia Heights, Minnesota and went to the public, parochial, and vocational schools. He took extension courses at the University of Minnesota and went to law school. Tomczyk lived in Minneapolis, Minnesota and worked for the Hennepin County Highway Department. Tomczyk was elected in a special election on March 19, 1947, to the Minnesota House of Representatives and was a Democrat. He served until his death in 1969. Tomczyk died at St. Mary's Hospital in Minneapolis after suffering a heart attack at his home.
