= Theresa Ericksen =

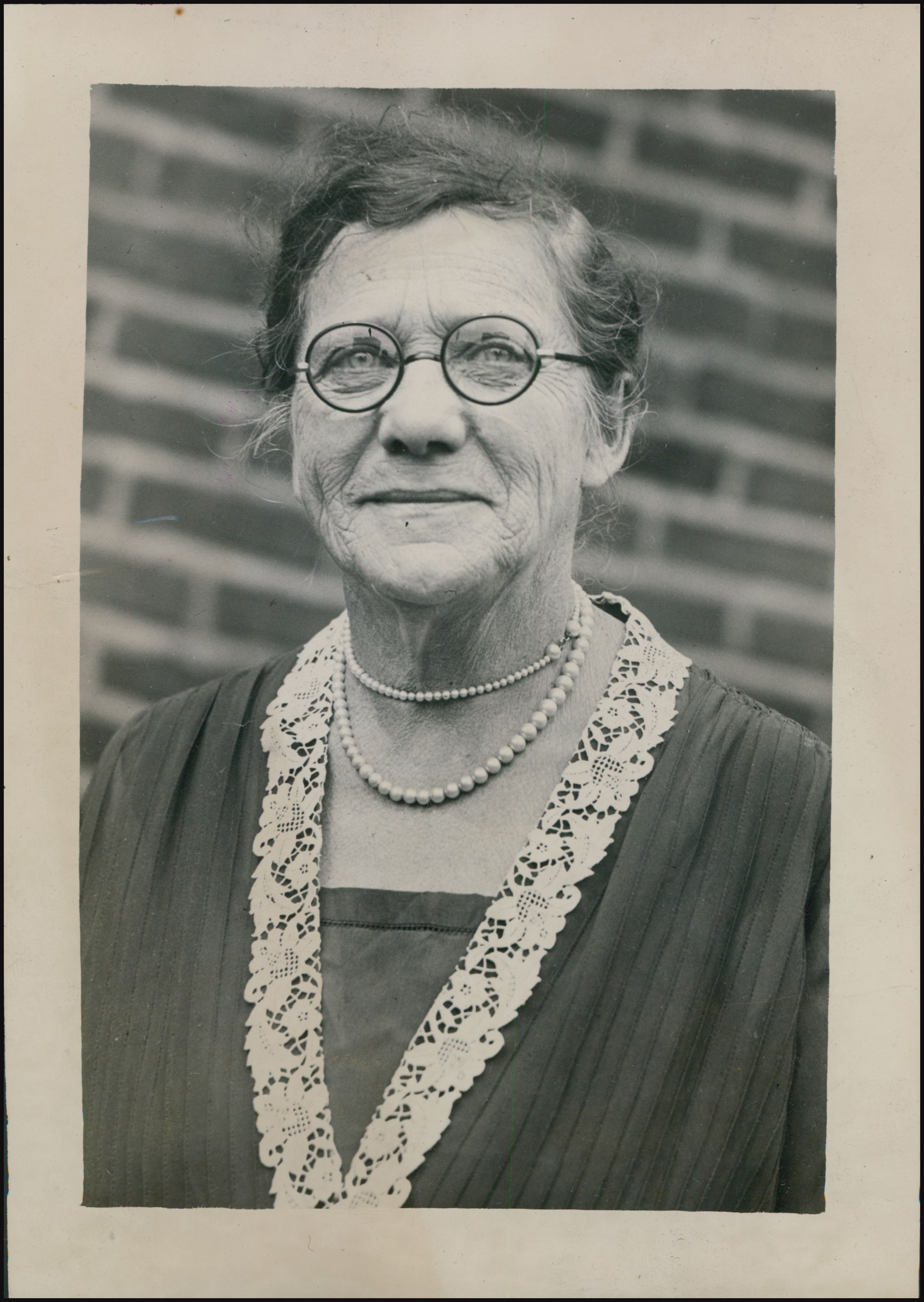
- Born: June 13, 1867; Oslo, Norway
- Died: August 31, 1943 (aged 76)
- Resting place: Fort Snelling National Cemetery
- Occupation: Nurse
- Years active: 1898-1933

Theresa Ericksen (1867–1943) was an U.S. Army Nurse who served in the Philippines-American War and World War I. She was a founder of the Minnesota Nurses Association. Late in her life, she requested to be buried at Fort Snelling Military Cemetery, which then only served active service members attached to the post. Her request led to the creation of Minnesota's first national cemetery.

== Life and career ==
Born in Oslo, Norway in 1867 and orphaned at age six, Ericksen grew up with her aunt and uncle, as well as her Norway-based grandmother. With her aunt and uncle, she traveled around the world, including to China and Japan. She moved to Minnesota with other family following the death of her grandmother.

Ericksen attended St. Paul's Northwestern Hospital's School of Nursing, graduating in 1894. Several years later, in 1898, she and seven other nurses formed the Ramsey County Nurses Association, which would go on to become the Minnesota Nurses Association. It was the first centralized nurse registry in the United States, and they wanted "to place the profession of nursing on the highest plane obtainable.”

Also in 1898, a new and committed citizen, Ericksen volunteered as a contract nurse for the U.S. Army. She first served at the Sternberg Army Hospital in Georgia, before volunteering to support Minnesota's 13th Volunteer Regiment in the Philippines-American War. She was a Regular Army Nurse, and the regiment's only female member. She was nicknamed "our little Minnesota nurse" by the soldiers. She remained in the Philippines for an extended time due to a shortage of nurses, this time wit the 17th Infantry Regiment. Following her return to the United States, she volunteered for service as a dietician in 1904, and worked at the Army hospital in Manila for another year.

She returned to the U.S. in 1907 due to an inflamed knee. Arthur Gillette developed his first jointed-steel knee brace for her. In 1918, Ericksen served as Anoka County's Public Health Nurse and as the high school nurse for the city of Anoka. However, when America became involved in World War I, Ericksen once-again was involved, this time with the American Red Cross. She treated casualties behind the lines near Chateau-Thierry, worked at an orphanage and an army hospital caring for flu-stricken soldiers, and returned home in 1919.

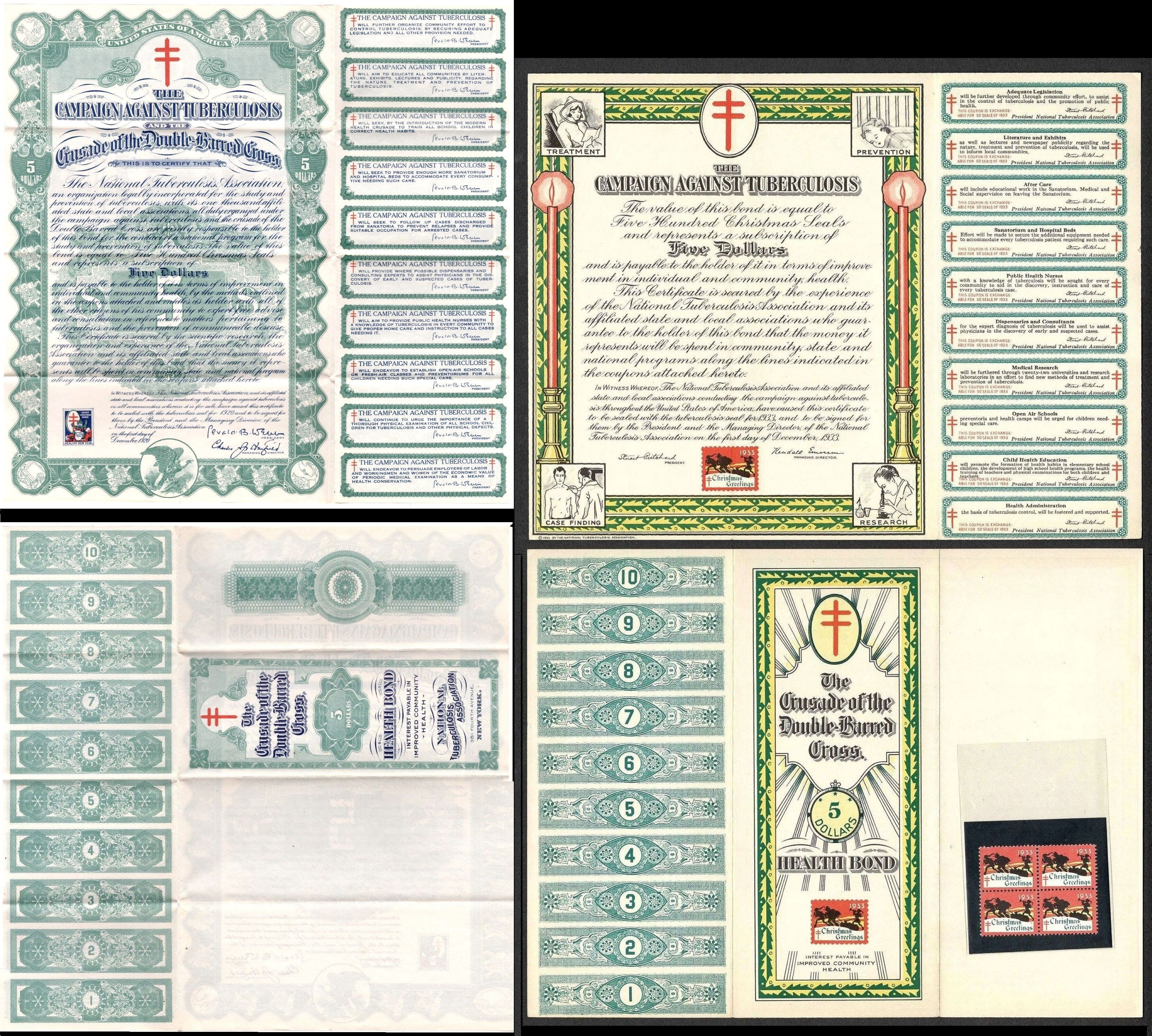
Examples of 1920 and 1933 Christmas Seal bonds which raised funds to fight tuberculosis. Ericksen received an award for her work selling Christmas Seals.

Back in the Twin Cities area, Ericksen worked to fight tuberculosis in what she called her "fourth war". She advocated for purchasing Christmas Seals to fund research to find a cure for tuberculosis, and received an award for her work in 1936. She was the first woman to receive the award, which was the Distinguished Service Medal from the Minnesota Public Health Association. It was presented to her by the Mayo brothers.

From 1926 to 1936, Ericksen served as superintendent for the Pleasant Day Nursery in St. Paul. She also advocated for servicemen who were debilitated from gas injuries and could not work or care for their families, many of whom had been denied benefits from the government. She was involved with veterans groups as well, including the United States War Veterans, the American Legion, and the Veterans of Foreign Wars.

In 1926, Ericksen moved into the Minneapolis Veterans Home and received her state veterans bonus. In 1933, Ericksen was injured on an icy walkway and could no longer work. Her friend F.W. Pederson asked where she wished to be buried; Ericksen responded Fort Snelling Military Cemetery. Pederson took the issue to Minnesota state representatives, who helped to lobby for the creation of Minnesota's first national cemetery. Ericksen was an advocate throughout the process, and served on the committee which founded the national cemetery. She attended the cemetery's dedication day.

Ericksen died on August 31, 1943. She was buried at Fort Snelling National Cemetery to taps and a twenty-one gun salute.
