= Heights Theater =

Movie theater in Columbia Heights, Minnesota, United States

Coordinates: 45.03977°N 93.24699°W

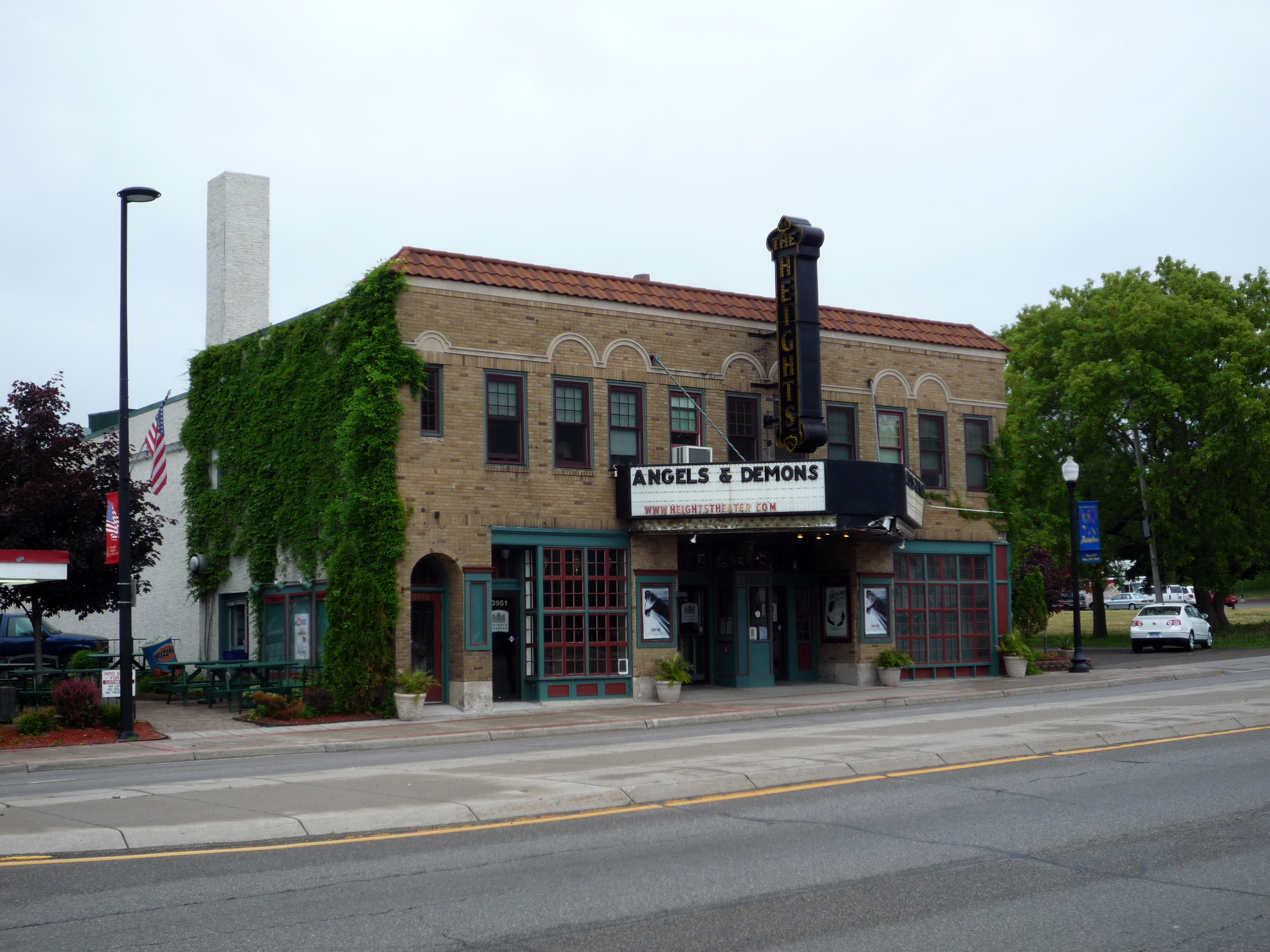
- Interactive map of Heights Theater
- Address: 3951 Central Ave NE, Columbia Heights
- Type: Indoor movie theater

Construction
- Built: 1926
- Renovated: 1990s

Website
- heightstheater.com

The Heights Theater is a historic theater in Columbia Heights, Minnesota. The theater touts itself as "the Twin Cities' longest continuously operated show house."

== Location ==
It is located at 3951 Central Avenue N.E. in Columbia Heights, two blocks north of the Minneapolis border.

== History ==
The theater was built in the Beaux Arts style in 1926. According to the theater's website, "The Heights has survived at least three fires, one bombing and 'The Big Blow of 1949' when a Fridley tornado twisted the tower sign." The Heights Theater originally ran vaudeville acts as well as first-run movies.

During the 1980s and early 1990s, the theater was left in disarray though it remained open. It ran late-run movies at a discount price. The City of Columbia Heights supposedly recommended the theater to be condemned. Tom Letness and David John Holmgren purchased the theater in 1998. The two men, who also owned the neighboring Dairy Queen, finished renovations at The Heights in the mid-1990s.

They reintroduced a Wurlitzer pipe organ courtesy of local radio station WCCO-AM. The renovation also included the addition of "antique chandeliers are suspended from the ceiling restored with 2600 Egyptian lead crystals", as well as new carpet, remodeled bathrooms and a new lobby. The outside of the theater was renovated thanks to the theater's original blueprints that were discovered by the University of Minnesota.

Today the theater runs first-run films as well as special events. The Heights Theater also adorns the street light banners that welcome people to Columbia Heights.
