= Richard E. Kraus =

American soldier

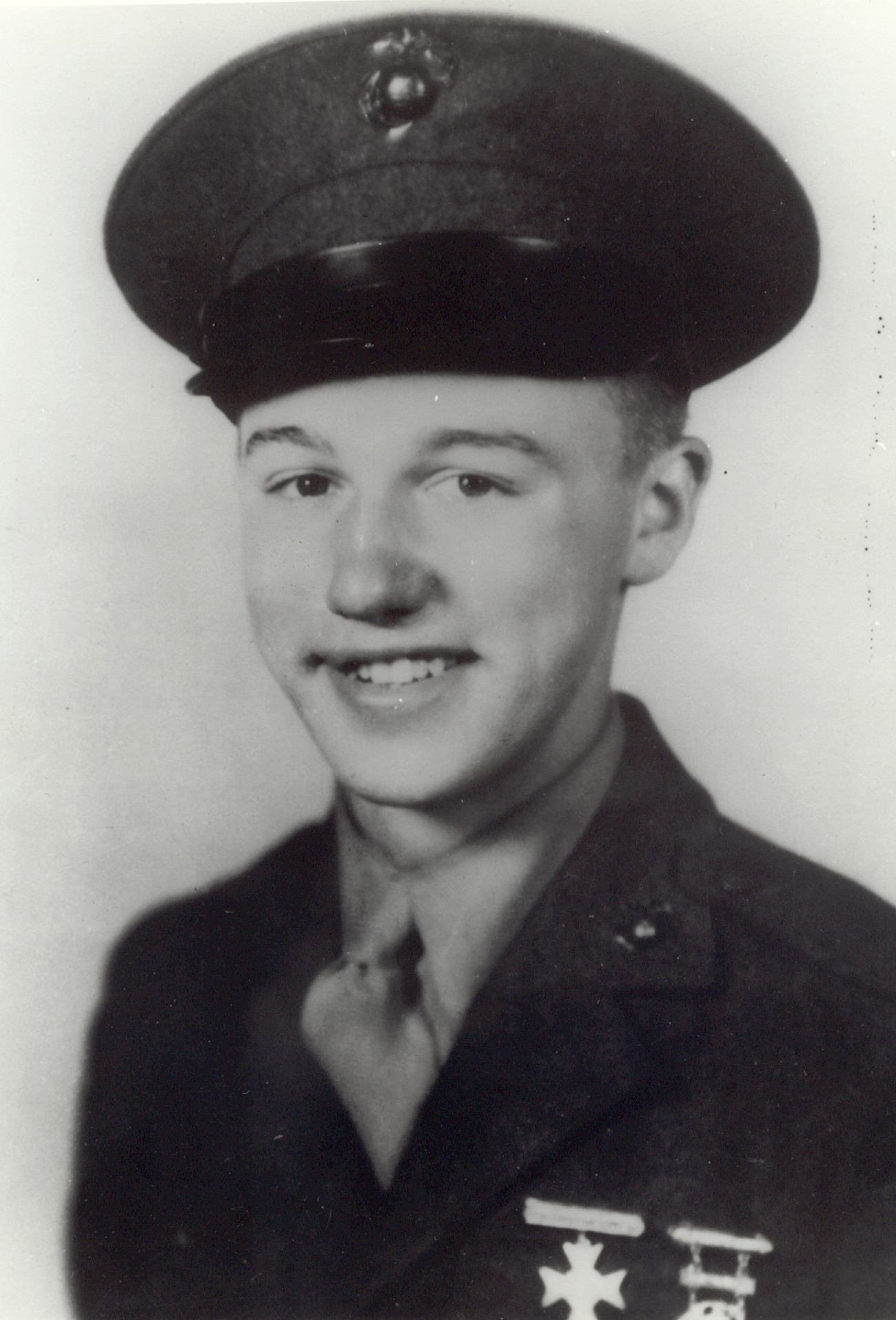
- Pfc. Richard E. Kraus, U.S. Marine Corps
- Born: November 24, 1925; Chicago, Illinois, US
- Died: October 3, 1944 (aged 18); Peleliu, Palau Islands
- Burial place: Ft. Snelling National Cemetery, Fort Snelling, Minnesota
- Military career
- Allegiance: United States
- Branch: United States Marine Corps
- Service years: 1943–1944
- Rank: Private First Class
- Units: 8th Amphibian Tractor Battalion, 1st Marine Division (Reinforced)
- Conflicts: World War II: Battle of Peleliu
- Awards: Medal of Honor; Purple Heart

Richard Edward Kraus (November 24, 1925 – October 3, 1944) was a United States Marine who was killed in action in World War II during the Battle of Peleliu on October 3, 1944. He posthumously received the Medal of Honor, the highest military honor awarded by the United States. He threw himself on a Japanese grenade to save his comrades.

== Biography ==
Kraus was born in Chicago on November 24, 1925. At age seven, his family moved to Minneapolis, Minnesota, where he attended Edison High School. He was inducted into the United States Marine Corps on his 18th birthday, after previously trying to enlist.

In July 1944, his unit shipped out for service in the Pacific Theatre and arrived at Pavuvu Island on August 20 and began preparing there for the invasion of Peleliu. On October 3, he was serving as an amphibian tractor driver with a detachment of the 8th Amphibian Tractor Battalion, attached to the 1st Marine Division since the September 15 D-Day landings on Peleliu. Kraus and three companions had accepted a volunteer mission that day to evacuate a wounded Marine from the front lines. As the group made their way forward, they were met by an intense barrage of enemy hand grenades, which forced them to take cover and abandon their mission.

While returning to the rear, the stretcher party observed two men approaching them who they believed were fellow Marines. Upon challenging the pair, they proved to be Japanese soldiers, and one of them responded by throwing a hand grenade into the midst of the group. Kraus hurled himself on top of the grenade and absorbed the blast, saving the lives of his three comrades.

Kraus had been overseas for three months at the time of the Peleliu battle, which was his first campaign. He was initially buried in the U.S. Armed Forces Cemetery on Peleliu, Palau Islands. In 1948, his remains were reinterred at his parents' request in Fort Snelling National Cemetery, Fort Snelling, Minnesota.

== Medal of Honor citation ==
Kraus's Medal of Honor citation reads:

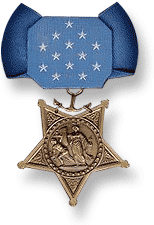

The President of the United States takes pride in presenting the MEDAL OF HONOR posthumously to

PRIVATE FIRST CLASS RICHARD E. KRAUS
UNITED STATES MARINE CORPS RESERVE

for service as set forth in the following

CITATION:

For conspicuous gallantry and intrepidity at the risk of his life above and beyond the call of duty while serving with the Eighth Amphibian Tractor Battalion, Third Amphibious Corps, Fleet Marine Force, in action against enemy Japanese forces on Peleliu, Palau Islands, on 5 October 1944. Unhesitatingly volunteering for the extremely hazardous mission of evacuating a wounded comrade from the front lines, Private First Class Kraus and three companions courageously made their way forward and successfully penetrated the lines for some distance before the enemy opened with an intense, devastating barrage of hand grenades which forced the stretcher party to take cover and subsequently abandon the mission. While returning to the rear, they observed two men approaching who appeared to be Marines and immediately demanded the password. When, instead of answering, one of the two Japanese threw a hand grenade into the midst of the group, Private First Class Kraus heroically flung himself upon the grenade and, covering it with his body, absorbed the full impact of the explosion and was instantly killed. By his prompt action and great personal valor in the face of almost certain death, he saved the lives of his three companions, and his loyal spirit of self-sacrifice reflects the highest credit upon himself and the United States Naval Service. He gallantly gave his life for his comrades.

/S/ HARRY S. TRUMAN

== Awards and decorations ==

1st row	Medal of Honor		
2nd row	Purple Heart	Combat Action Ribbon	Presidential Unit Citation
3rd row	American Campaign Medal	Asiatic-Pacific Campaign Medal with one campaign star	World War II Victory Medal

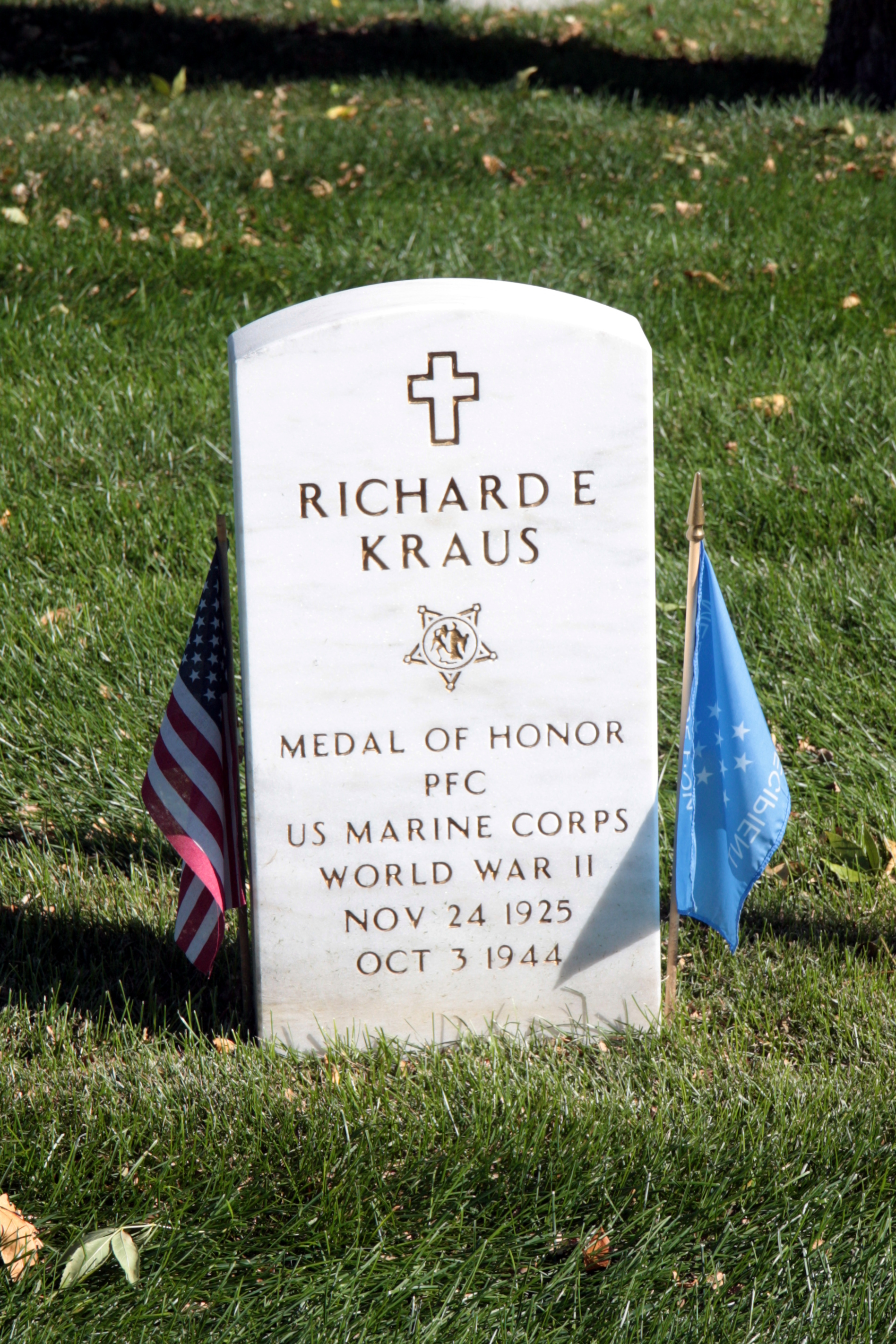
Richard E Kraus headstone in Fort Snelling National Cemetery

== Honors ==
- Richard E. Kraus is one of three Minnesota Medal of Honor recipients from the Northeast Twin Cities who are named on the Anoka County Veteran's Memorial at Bunker Hills Anoka County Park in Coon Rapids, Minnesota.
- The United States Navy destroyer USS Richard E. Kraus (DD-849) was named after him in 1945.
- The Assault Amphibian Schools Battalion at Marine Corps Base Camp Pendleton was named and dedicated in his memory.
- Kraus-Hartig VFW Post 6587 in Spring Lake Park, Minnesota, is named after him and another WWII casualty.

== See also ==
- List of Medal of Honor recipients
- List of Medal of Honor recipients for World War II
