= Truman Kimbro =

United States Army soldier (1919–1944)

Truman Carol Kimbro
- Born: May 27, 1919; Madisonville, Texas, US
- Died: December 19, 1944 (aged 25); Büllingen, Belgium
- Burial place: Henri-Chapelle American Cemetery, Liège, Belgium
- Military career
- Allegiance: United States of America
- Branch: United States Army
- Service years: 1941–1944
- Rank: Technician Fourth Grade
- Units: 2nd Engineer Combat Battalion, 2nd Infantry Division
- Conflicts: World War II
- Awards: Medal of Honor; Purple Heart

Truman Carol Kimbro (May 27, 1919 – December 19, 1944) was a United States Army soldier and a recipient of the United States military's highest decoration—the Medal of Honor—for his actions in World War II.

== Biography ==
Kimbro was drafted into the Army from Houston, Texas in December 1941, just a few days before the attack on Pearl Harbor. By December 19, 1944, he was serving as a technician fourth grade in Company C, 2nd Engineer Combat Battalion, 2nd Infantry Division. On that day, he was assigned to lead a squad in the mining of a crossroads near Rocherath, Belgium. Finding that the area was covered by enemy forces, he left his men in a protected position and went forward alone. Although wounded on his approach, he continued on his mission and successfully laid mines across the road before being killed by enemy fire. For these actions, he was posthumously awarded the Medal of Honor five months later, on May 24, 1945.

Kimbro was buried at the Henri-Chapelle American Cemetery in Henri-Chapelle, Belgium. His grave can be located in Plot F Row 6 Grave 28.

== Medal of Honor citation ==
Technician Fourth Grade Kimbro's official Medal of Honor citation reads:

On 19 December 1944, as scout, he led a squad assigned to the mission of mining a vital crossroads near Rocherath, Belgium. At the first attempt to reach the objective, he discovered it was occupied by an enemy tank and at least 20 infantrymen. Driven back by withering fire, Technician 4th Grade Kimbro made 2 more attempts to lead his squad to the crossroads but all approaches were covered by intense enemy fire. Although warned by our own infantrymen of the great danger involved, he left his squad in a protected place and, laden with mines, crawled alone toward the crossroads. When nearing his objective he was severely wounded, but he continued to drag himself forward and laid his mines across the road. As he tried to crawl from the objective his body was riddled with rifle and machinegun fire. The mines laid by his act of indomitable courage delayed the advance of enemy armor and prevented the rear of our withdrawing columns from being attacked by the enemy.

== Awards and decorations ==

1st row	Medal of Honor		
2nd row	Purple Heart	Army Good Conduct Medal	American Defense Service Medal
2nd row	American Campaign Medal	European–African–Middle Eastern Campaign Medal with one campaign star	World War II Victory Medal

== Honored in ship naming ==
The U.S. Army ship USAT Sgt. Truman Kimbro which served in the Pacific Ocean at the end of World War II was named in his honor.

== See also ==
- List of Medal of Honor recipients
- List of Medal of Honor recipients for World War II
