= Grain d'Orge Brewery =

Brewery in Hombourg, Belgium

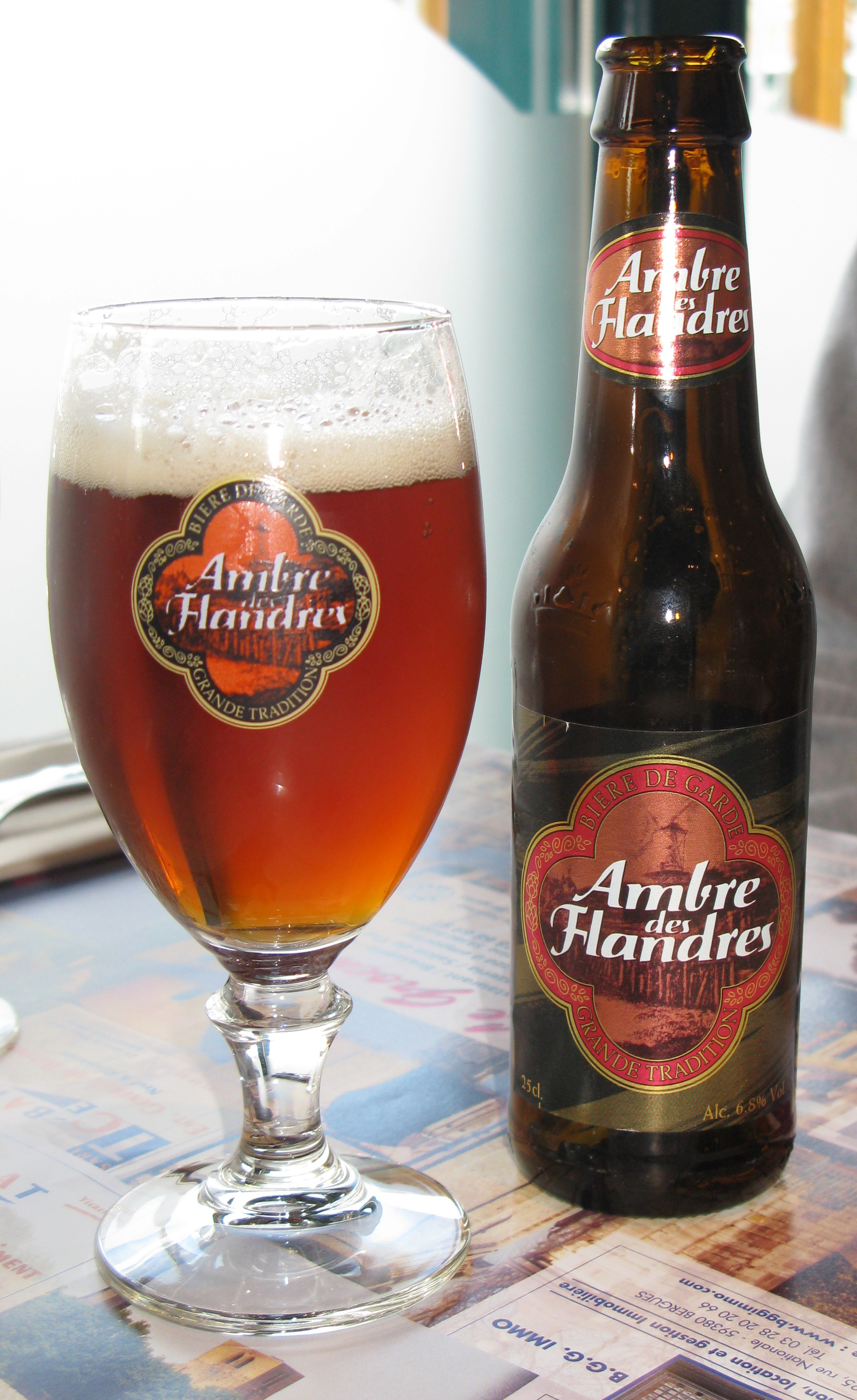
- Interactive map of Grain d'Orge Brewery
- Type: Microbrewery
- Location: Hombourg, Wallonia, Belgium
- Coordinates: 50°45′12.72″N 6°1′16.53″E
- Opened: 1997
- Annual production volume: 4,000 hl (2017)
- Website: grain-dorge.com

Grain d'Orge Brewery "Brasserie du Grain d’Orge" is a microbrewery in the village of Hombourg in Wallonia, Belgium. The Wallonia tourist board has given the pub and brewery the label "Bistrot de Terroir" (quality label), which distinguishes the "cafés typiques de Wallonie" that provide a warm welcoming atmosphere ("vous garantit un accueil convivial") and the quality of an authentic establishment and the authentic experience.

== History ==
In 1997, owner and brewmaster Benoît Johnen, reopened the local café of his native village Hombourg, and turned it into a micro brewery where small batches of beer were produced. In 2000, he launched a major overhaul of the building, creating a spacious annex that could hold the brewing equipment bought form the breweries ‘La Magonnette’ and ‘Ruwet’, which resulted in a first brew in 2002.

In 2007, 750Hl of beer were produced and in 2008, he it was decided that the location was becoming a major obstacle to further development. The family farm is chosen as the location of choice. The building of the former garage GjCars was converted to storage and the stables were converted to a brewing hall, spacious and well within the standards required.

Over the years the production has grown and new beers have been created to diversify the assortment : la Canaille, la Grelotte, The Pom and also l’Esprit d’Orge, a liquor based on an eau-de-vie derived from beer in collaboration with a local distillery. In 2017, the total production is 4000Hl.

== 3 Schténg ==
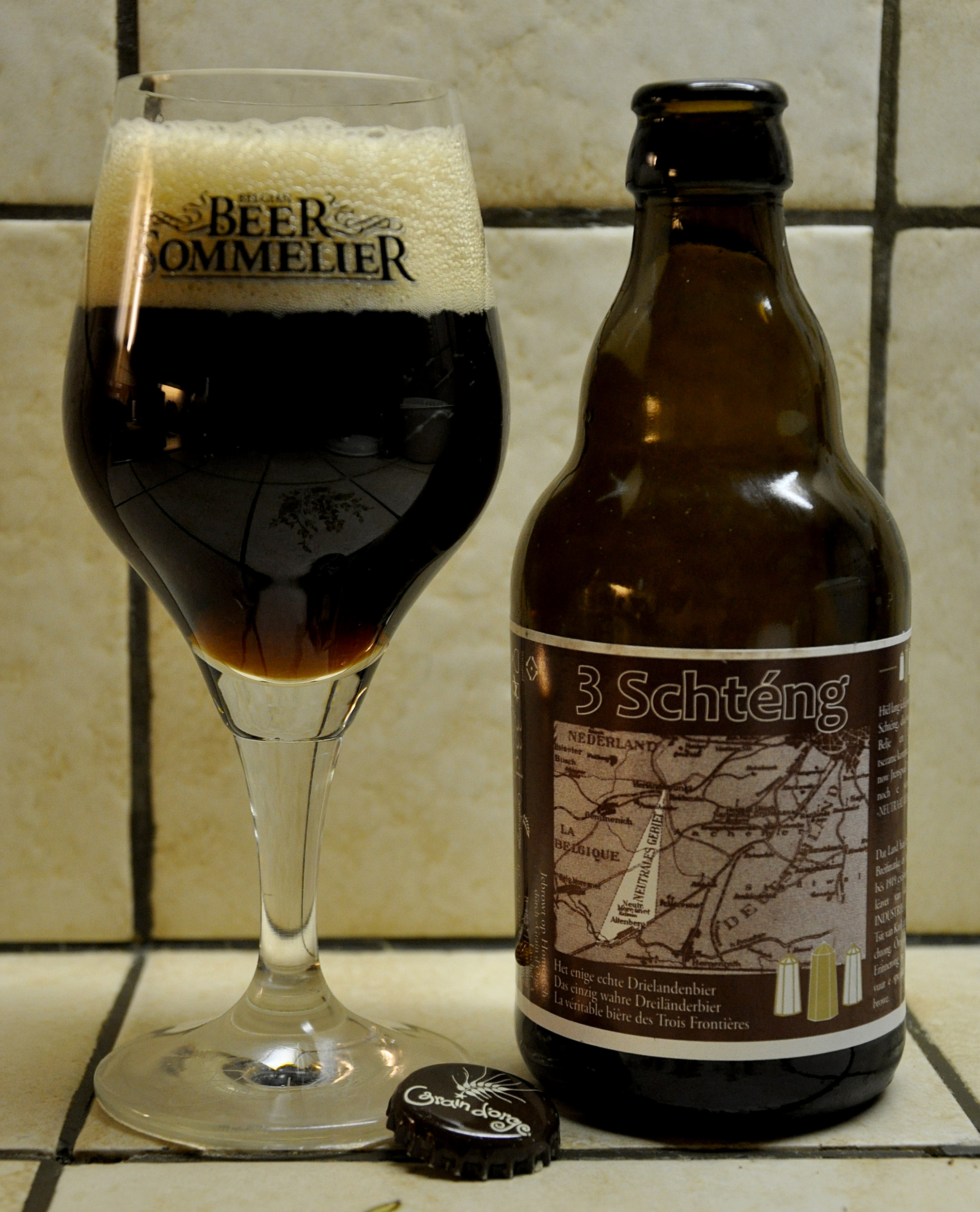

3 Schténg is a traditional dark brown sour beer (Flemish Old Brown) with an abv of 6%, produced using the top fermentation process. It was introduced in 2002.

The name 3 Schténg is Platdiets, a Limburgish dialect, which translates as "Three stones" (Drie stenen), which refers to the three border marking stones at the tripoint of Vaalserberg on the Dutch-Belgian-German border, a tourist attraction in the community of Gemmenich. On the tripoint a panoramic tower with restaurant has been built, the DrieLaenderpunkt Aussichtsturm or Baudewijntoren. The beer is produced for the restaurant in this tower.
