= Hombourg, Belgium =

Hombourg Homburg
- Village
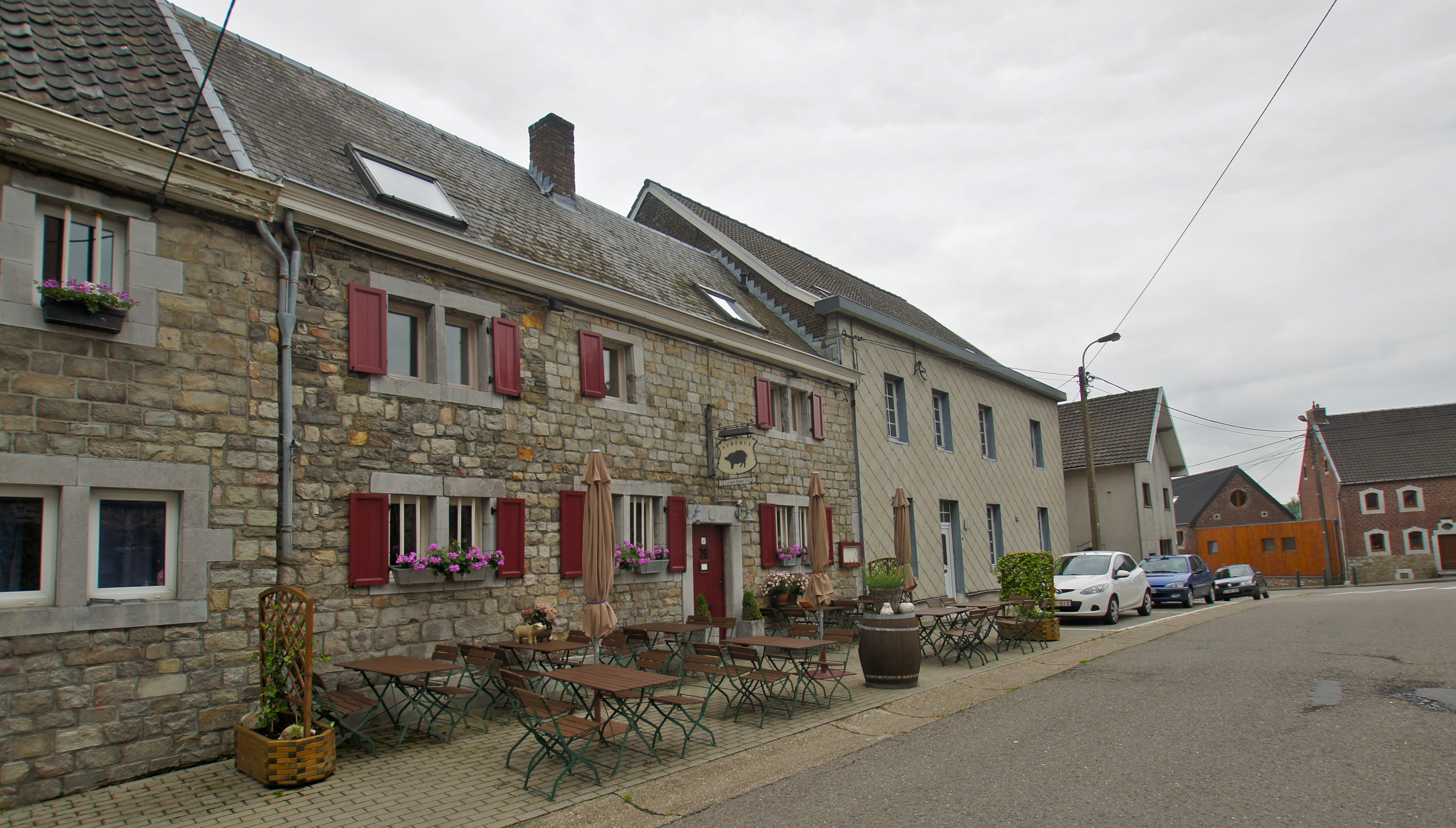

- Location in Belgium
- Coordinates: 50°43′23″N 5°55′14″E
- Country: Belgium
- Region: Wallonia
- Province: Liège
- Municipality: Plombières
- Time zone: CET

Hombourg (French pronunciation: [ɔ̃buʁ]; German: Homburg; Dutch: Homburg; Limburgish: (op) Homerech; Walloon: Hôbâr) is a village of Wallonia and a district of the municipality of Plombières, located in the province of Liège, Belgium.

== History ==
=== Origins ===
The existence of Hombourg is first recorded in 1070, as the settlement of "Hunborc". As early as 1124, the chapter of St. Peter's Collegiate Church in Liège owned property in Homburg ("Homborgh") and established a court of justice.

=== Duchy of Limburg ===
Homburg was part of the Duchy of Limburg. In 1286, the castle of Vilhenru (now Vieljaeren) was destroyed by Duke John I of Brabant as part of the war of succession of the Duchy of Limburg which he seized after the Battle of Worringen in 1288.

The parish of Homburg was created from the earlier parish of Teuven; the church building at Homburg dates from the 13th century, but records demonstrate the existence of the parish before that time.

The seigneurie hautaine of the towns of Homburg and Rémersdael was first granted by the King of Spain between 1560 and 1615 to Henri de Ghoer, Lord of Vieljaeren, and in 1648 to Winand and Jean-Henri d'Eynatten d'Obsinnich. Count Frederick of Eynatten sold it in 1721 to the Baroness of Hochsteden, wife of Baron Christian of Furstenberg.

=== From 1794 to the present day ===
After the second invasion of French troops in 1794, although the former Hombourg administration was suppressed, the region did not submit to the new regime and awaited the return of the Austrians. An uprising broke out and led to the conjuration du Bois-Rouge at Rémersdael on 8 February 1799, which was betrayed and led to the execution of several conspirators, including a Hombourgeois.

In 1850, 85 inhabitants of Rémersdael requested the foundation of their submunicipality, and the Monitor of 12 December 1852 published a decree separating Rémersdael from Homburg.

In the second half of the 19th century and until the First World War, the road network, municipal and school buildings were the subject of new developments and, in 1895, the Liège-Plombières railway line with a railway station in Hombourg was inaugurated. On the night of 3-4 August 1914, the army blew up the head of the Laschet tunnel in Homburg. This was the first tangible sign of the First World War in Belgium.

During the interwar period, the Homburg barracks and the Homburg Dairy, built near the station, allowed the area to develop.

During the Second World War, Homburg was annexed by the Third Reich, but most young men from the town went into hiding to avoid being conscripted to the German Army.

== Languages ==
Since the time of the French invasions the Meuse-Rhenish dialect has been widely spoken in Hombourg.

The local dialect was used in administrative documents until the 16th century, when it was supplanted by "Bromesch", the language of government of the Spanish and Austrian Netherlands. In religious matters, German has been in common use from the 18th century onwards.

In the 19th century until 1910, linguistic censuses record a great number of different languages spoken by the residents of Hombourg, although some languages may have been recorded incorrectly due to the ignorance of local dialects by those carrying out the survey. The censuses of 1920 and 1930 show an increasing dominance of the French language. From 1919 the area's schools taught in French instead of German, and French also became the primary ecclesiastical language after the Second World War.

Administratively, the commune has been French since 1794 (except from 1940 to 1944). At the establishment of the language areas and facilities in 1962, Hombourg adopted French is its official language for administrative purposes, in common with its 8 neighbouring municipalities. In schools, the language of instruction is French, with study of German and Dutch from the third year of primary school.

Currently, about 85% of the population is French-speaking, 7% German-speaking, and 8% Dutch-speaking. About half of the French-speaking population (but mainly the age groups over 40) also know the local dialect.

== Traditions ==
Following a procession in which a statue of the Virgin was abandoned at the roadside by the bearers of the secular (1591) Society of Saint-Brice, the parish priest founded a "Society of St. Joseph" especially to carry this statue. The village was then divided between supporters of the Society of Saint-Brice ("Brices") and the Society of St. Joseph ("Joupes").

These rivalries were reflected both at the corporate level (shooting and amenity society, youth, harmony society, theatre society) and at the level of political parties in the local council.

Attempts at conciliation took place in 1914 and from 1964 to 1970 each time at the instigation of the mayor, but the rivalries continued for over a century. Today, the tension has fallen and only a friendly spirit of competition remains between the level two groups. The Hombourgeois now toast to the health of their tradition with their local craft beers, the "Joup" (brown) and the "Brice" (blonde).

== Demography ==
In 1856, shortly after its separation from Rémersdael, the population of Homburg was 1,127. It rose to 1,476 in 1910, falling back to 1,402 in 1920 and rising again to 1,602 in 1947. The population gradually declined to 1,279 in 1987, then rose to 1,405 in 1992 and stabilized at that figure since then.

== Monuments and Curiosities ==
=== The American Cemetery of Henri-Chapelle ===
The 23 hectare American Cemetery of Henri-Chapelle, has nearly 8,000 graves of American soldiers and allies who fell mainly during the Battle of Aachen and the von Rundstedt offensive in the Ardennes.

This cemetery initially counted two cemeteries, one American with 16,000 graves and another, a German with 9,000 graves, before being remodelled in 1960 after the repatriation of many bodies and the transfer of the German cemetery to Lommel. The new flowered and tree-lined cemetery, a mausoleum with a map museum tracing the Allied advance, were inaugurated in 1960 by General Eisenhower. The American Battle Monuments Commission maintains the entire site.

The name of the cemetery "Henri-Chapelle" is related to the geographical proximity of this village but it is entirely located on the territory of the former municipality of Homburg.

=== The castles of Vieljaeren and Berlieren ===
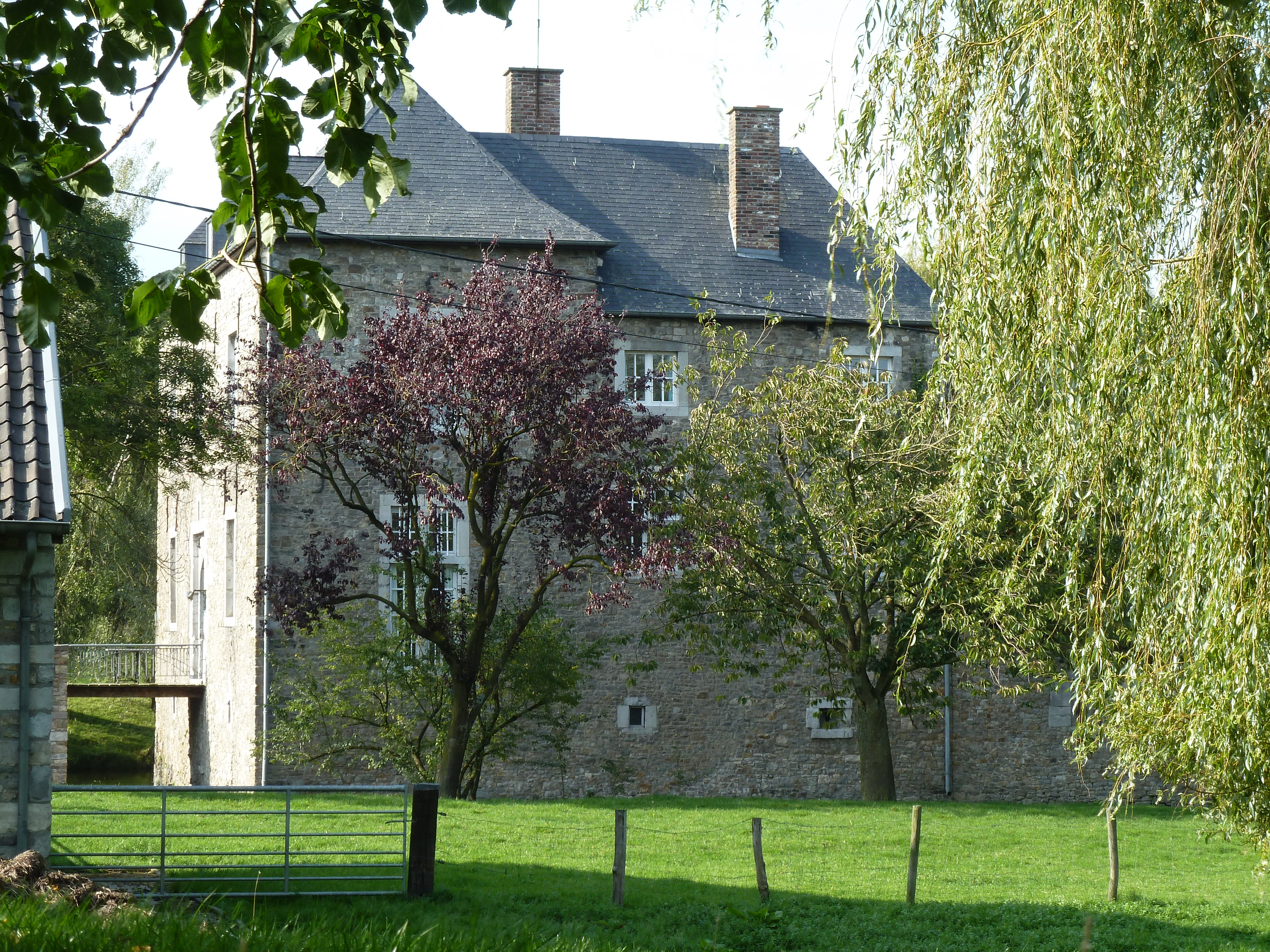
Vieljaeren Castle

Berlieren Castle is first mentioned in 1124. Used as a castle farm until 2007, its porch dates back to the 17th century. Since 2008, Berlieren Castle has been fully renovated, with the provision of housing, cottages, guest rooms, banqueting hall and seminar centre for conferences, weddings or other events.

Vieljaeren Castle is first mentioned in 1286 (when it was destroyed by John I of Brabant). It has retained its medieval character and is surrounded by moats.
