= List of protected heritage sites in Welkenraedt =

This table shows an overview of the protected heritage sites in the Walloon town Welkenraedt. This list is part of Belgium's national heritage.

Object	Year/architect	Town/section	Address	Coordinates	Number^{?}	Image
Ensemble of the votive chapel "Croix de Pierre" to "Trinity" and the three elm trees ^{(nl)} ^{(fr)}		Welkenraedt	Chaussée de Liège	50.673706°N 5.910690°E	63084-CLT-0002-01 Info	Ensemble van de votiefkapel "Croix de Pierre" te "Trinité" en de drie olmen
Church of Saint-Georges ^{(nl)} ^{(fr)}		Welkenraedt		50.676412°N 5.931825°E	63084-CLT-0003-01 Info	Kerk Saint-Georges
Chapel of Saint-Roch: facades and roofs ^{(nl)} ^{(fr)}		Welkenraedt	rue de Verviers	50.668112°N 5.919794°E	63084-CLT-0004-01 Info	Kapel Saint-Roch: gevels en daken
House: old quartermaster (facades, gables and roofs), retaining walls, stairs and paving of the southern terrace ^{(nl)} ^{(fr)}		Welkenraedt	chaussée de Liège n° 59	50.664394°N 5.904052°E	63084-CLT-0005-01 Info	Huis: oude kwartiermeester (gevels, puntgevels en daken), keermuren, trappen en bestrating van het zuidelijke terras
House: walls and roofs ^{(nl)} ^{(fr)}		Welkenraedt	place des combattants n° 21	50.661194°N 5.972198°E	63084-CLT-0006-01 Info	Huis: gevels en daken
Bos van Hees (partly) ^{(nl)} ^{(fr)}		Welkenraedt		50.689603°N 5.934686°E	63084-CLT-0007-01 Info	Bos van Hees (deels)
Castle Baelen ^{(nl)} ^{(fr)}		Welkenraedt	rue du Château de Ruyff, n° 68	50.673218°N 5.955406°E	63084-CLT-0009-01 Info	Kasteel Baelen
Public pump iron ^{(nl)} ^{(fr)}		Welkenraedt	n° 48 en 50	50.676833°N 5.928615°E	63084-CLT-0010-01 Info	Openbare ijzeren pomp
Castle Ruyff ^{(nl)} ^{(fr)}		Welkenraedt	rue Saint-Vincent n°71:	50.674114°N 5.950970°E	63084-CLT-0013-01 Info	Kasteel Ruyff
Cast iron pump from the 19th and 20th centuries ^{(nl)} ^{(fr)}		Welkenraedt	rue Nishaye, voor n° 30	50.676772°N 5.933614°E	63084-CLT-0014-01 Info	Gietijzeren pomp uit de 19e en 20e eeuw
pump ^{(nl)} ^{(fr)}		Welkenraedt	rue Nishaye n° 42	50.676506°N 5.934236°E	63084-CLT-0015-01 Info	Pomp

== See also ==
- List of protected heritage sites in Liège (province)
- Welkenraedt
