= Welkenraedt =

Municipality in Liège Province, Wallonia, Belgium

Welkenraedt Welkenrote (Walloon)
- Municipality
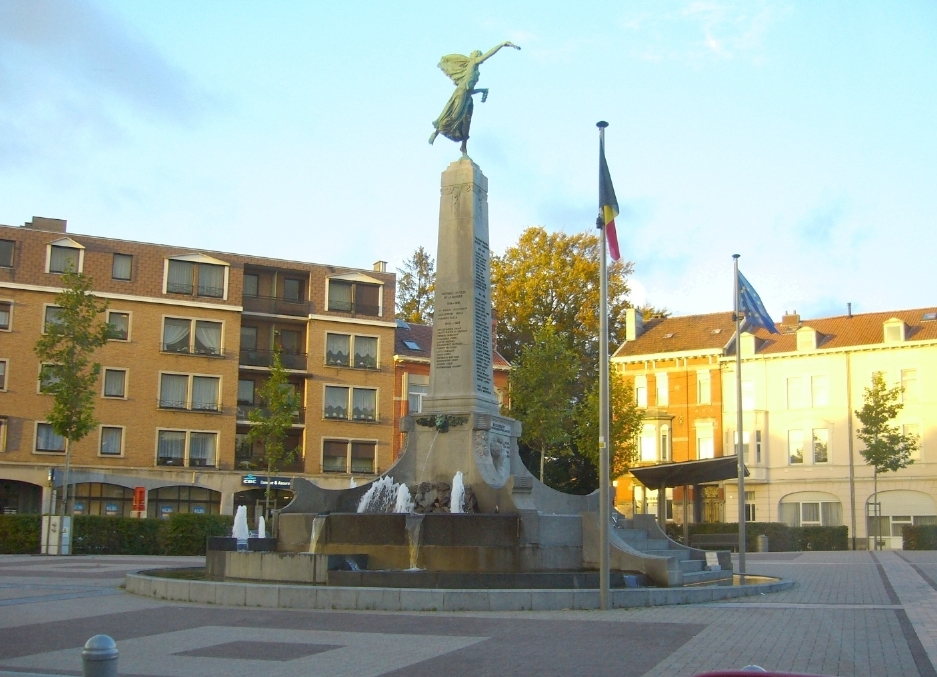

- Flag Coat of arms

- Location of Welkenraedt in the province of Liège
- Interactive map of Welkenraedt
- Location in Belgium
- Coordinates: 50°39′N 05°58′E
- Country: Belgium
- Community: French Community
- Region: Wallonia
- Province: Liège
- Arrondissement: Verviers

Government
  - Mayor: Jean-Luc Nix (MR)
  - Governing party: LB - Plus

Area
  - Total: 24.72 km^{2} (9.54 sq mi)

Population (2018-01-01)
  - Total: 9,920
  - Density: 401/km^{2} (1,040/sq mi)
- Postal codes: 4840–4841
- NIS code: 63084
- Area codes: 087
- Website: www.welkenraedt.be

Welkenraedt (French pronunciation: [wɛlkənʁat]; Ripuarian: Wälekete; Walloon: Welkenrote) is a municipality of Wallonia located in the province of Liège, Belgium.

On January 1, 2018, Welkenraedt had a total population of 9,920. The total area is 24.47 km^{2} which gives a population density of 405 inhabitants per km^{2}.

The municipality consists of the following districts: Henri-Chapelle and Welkenraedt.

== American Cemetery and Memorial ==
The town and former municipality of Henri-Chapelle is home to the Henri-Chapelle American Cemetery and Memorial which contains the graves of 7,992 members of the American military who died in World War II.

== Gallery ==
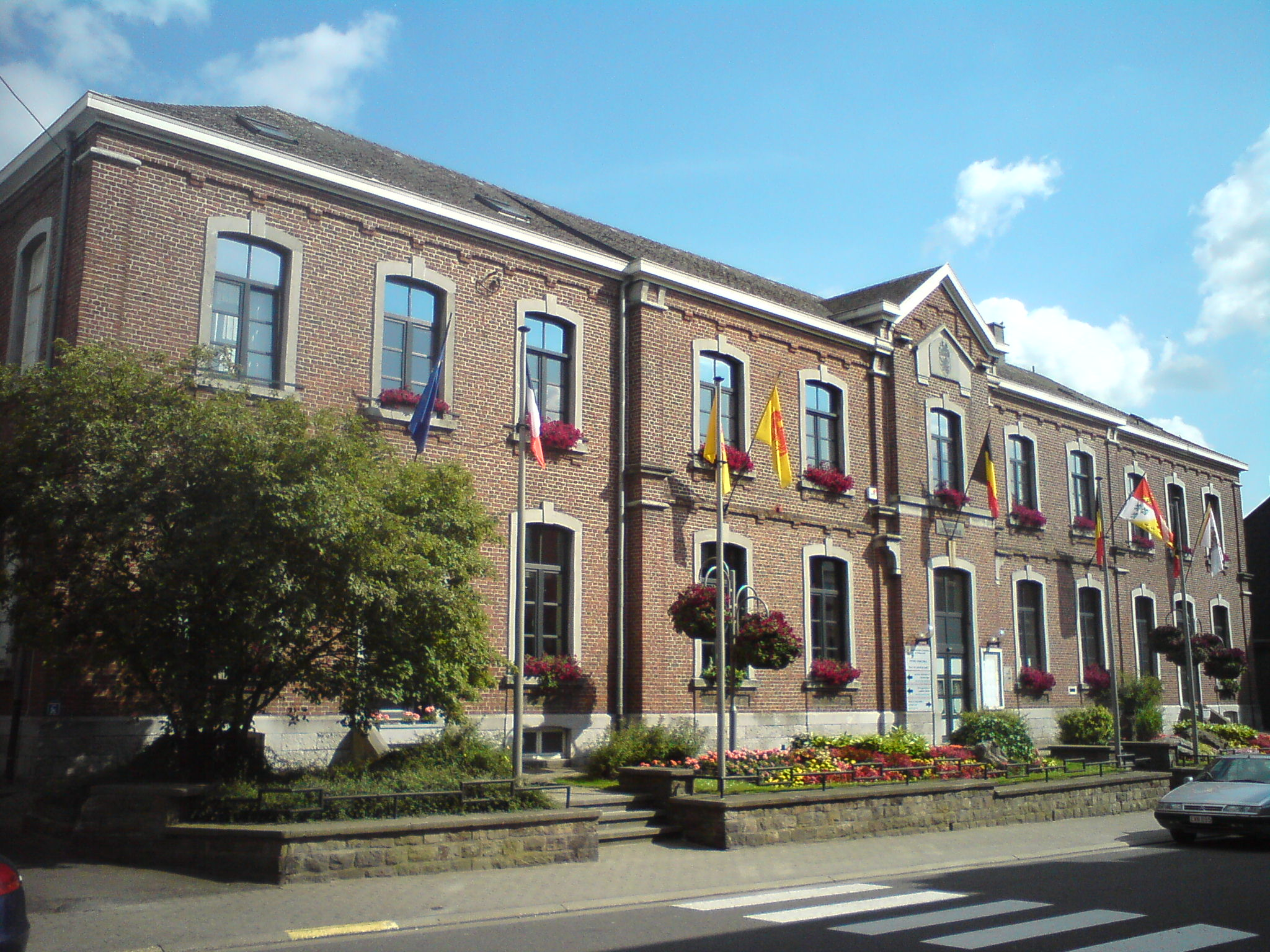
Town hall

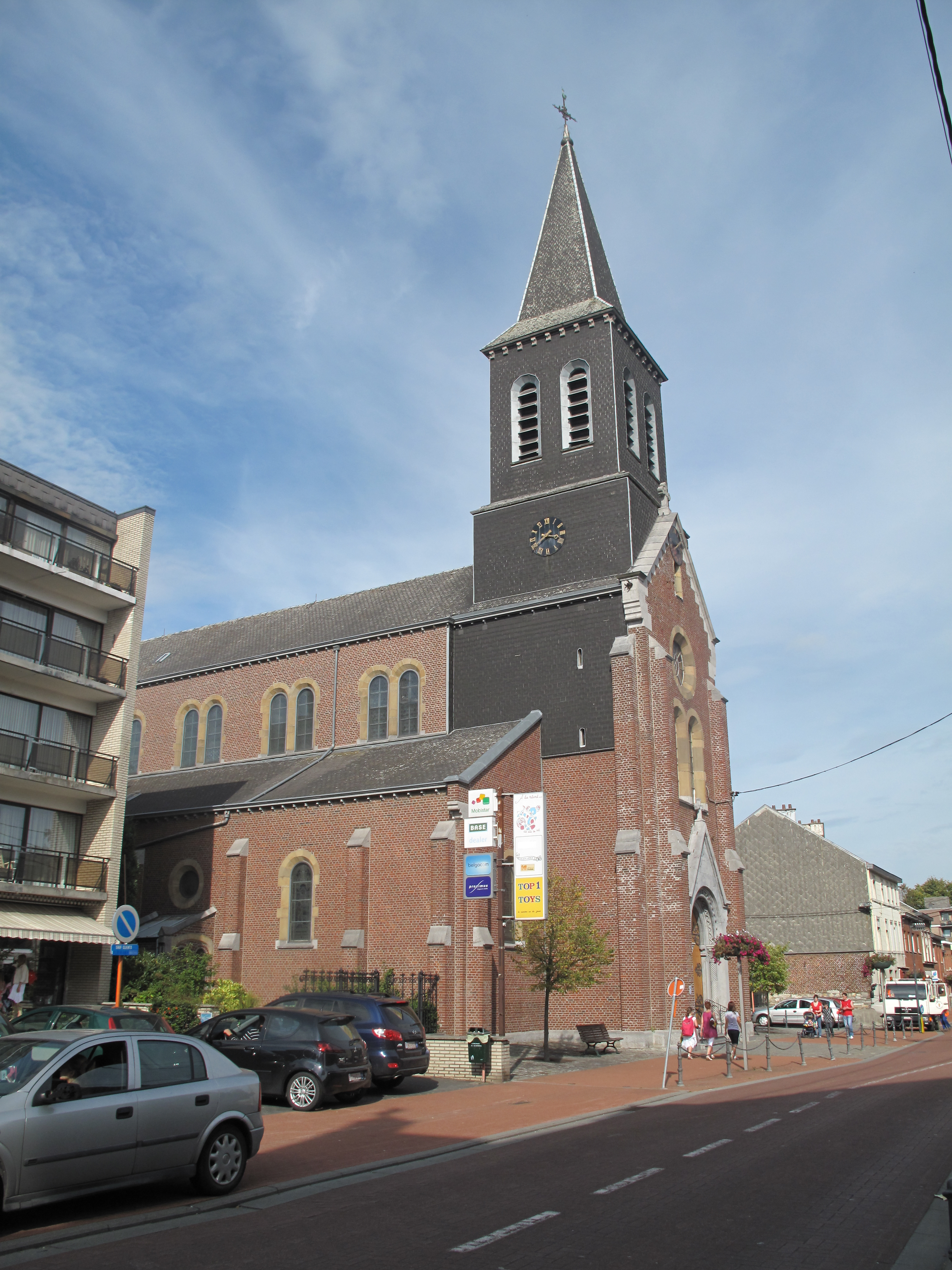
Church

== Twin towns ==
- Nove, Italy
- Epfig, France

== See also ==
- List of protected heritage sites in Welkenraedt
