= USS Castle =

Gearing-class destroyer

History

United States
- Name: USS Castle
- Namesake: Guy W. S. Castle
- Builder: Federal Shipbuilding and Drydock Company, Newark, New Jersey
- Laid down: 11 July 1945
- Completed: Never
- Commissioned: Never
- Stricken: 2 November 1954
- Identification: DD-720
- Fate: Sold incomplete for scrapping 29 August 1955
- Notes: Construction suspended when 60.3% complete

General characteristics
- Class & type: Gearing-class destroyer
- Displacement: 2,425 long tons (2,464 t) (standard); 3,460 long tons (3,520 t) (full)
- Length: 390 ft 6 in (119.0 m) (overall)
- Beam: 40 ft 10 in (12.45 m)
- Draft: 14 ft 4 in (4.37 m)
- Propulsion: 2 × geared turbines; 2 × propellers
- Speed: 35 kn (65 km/h; 40 mph)
- Range: 4,500 nmi (8,300 km; 5,200 mi) at 20 kn (37 km/h; 23 mph)
- Complement: 336 officers and enlisted
- Armament: 6 × 5 in (127 mm)/38 caliber guns; 12 × 40 mm (1.6 in) Bofors AA guns; 11 × 20 mm (0.79 in) Oerlikon AA cannons; 10 × 21 in (533 mm) torpedo tubes; 6 × depth charge projectors; 2 × depth charge tracks

USS Castle (DD-720) was a planned United States Navy Gearing-class destroyer laid down during World War II but never completed. It was to be named for Guy W. S. Castle (1879–1919), a United States Navy officer and Medal of Honor recipient.

Castle was laid down on 11 July 1945 by the Federal Shipbuilding and Drydock Company at Newark, New Jersey. The end of World War II in August 1945 resulted in the termination of the contract for her construction on 11 December 1945. Although the award of the contract was reinstated, work on Castle was suspended on 11 February 1946. A little over five months later, on 18 July 1946, the Commandant, 3rd Naval District, was authorized to accept Castle in an uncompleted state.

Delivered as 60.3% complete, Castle was slated for scrapping in a Congressional resolution approved on 23 August 1954. Her name was stricken from the Naval Vessel Register on 2 November 1954, and she was sold for scrapping on 29 August 1955.
