= Plombières =

Municipality in Liège Province, Wallonia, Belgium

Plombières So-on-Mont-d'-Plomb (Walloon): Blieberg (Dutch); Bleiberg (German)
- Municipality
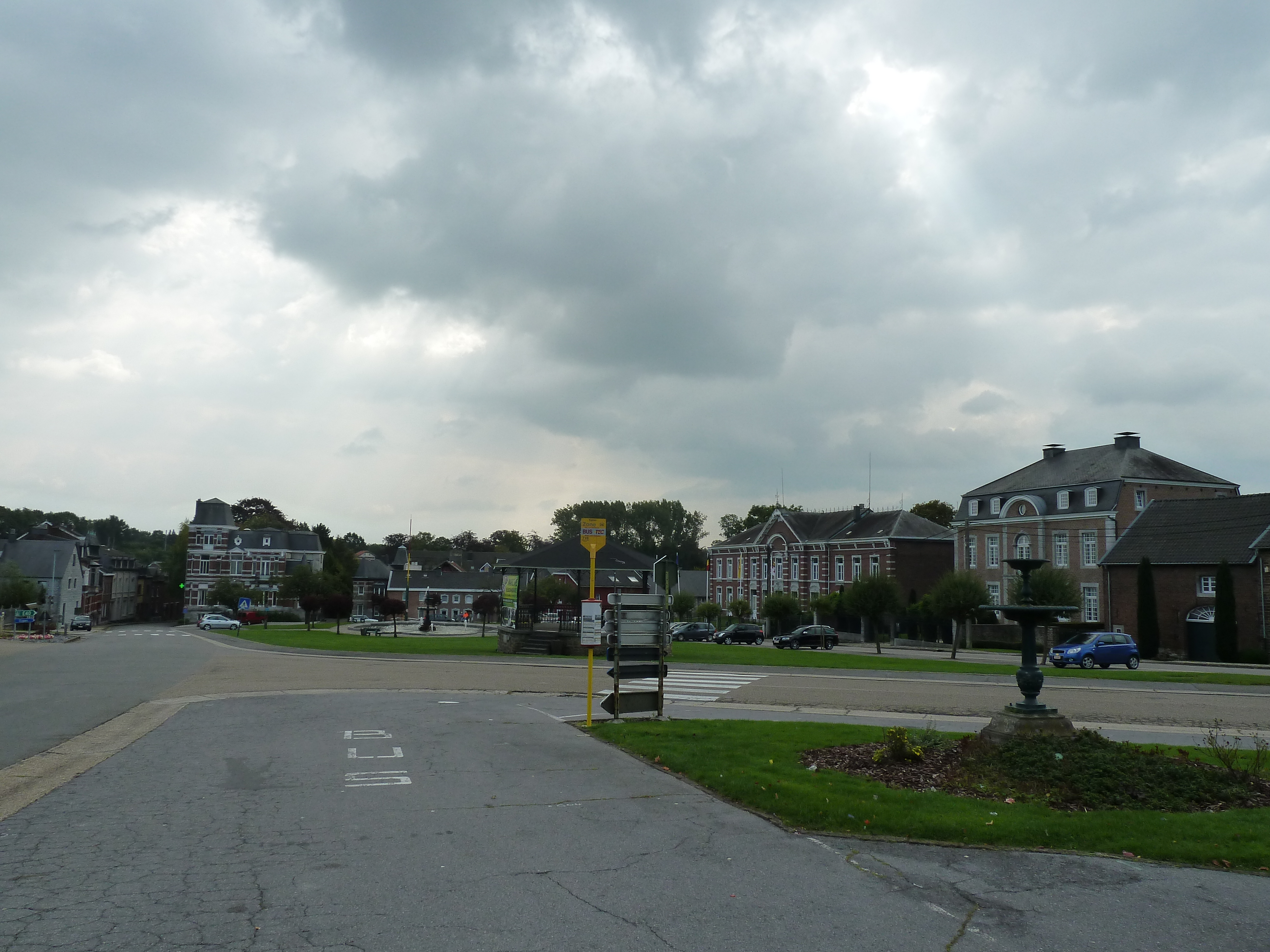
- Place Communale

- Flag Coat of arms

- Location of Plombières in the province of Liège
- Interactive map of Plombières
- Location in Belgium
- Coordinates: 50°44′N 05°57′E
- Country: Belgium
- Community: French Community
- Region: Wallonia
- Province: Liège
- Arrondissement: Verviers

Government
  - Mayor: Marie Stassen (OCP)
  - Governing party: Ouverture Citoyenne Plombières (OCP) - @ctions

Area
  - Total: 53.17 km^{2} (20.53 sq mi)

Population (2018-01-01)
  - Total: 10,401
  - Density: 195.6/km^{2} (506.6/sq mi)
- Postal codes: 4850-4852
- NIS code: 63088
- Area codes: 087
- Website: www.plombieres.be

Plombières (French pronunciation: [plɔ̃bjɛʁ]; German: Bleyberg or Bleiberg, Dutch: Blieberg; Walloon: So-on-Mont-d'-Plomb) is a municipality of Wallonia located in the province of Liège, Belgium.

On 1 January 2006, Plombières had a total population of 10,401. The total area is 53.17 km^{2} which gives a population density of 200 inhabitants per km^{2}.

The municipality consists of the following districts: Gemmenich, Hombourg, Montzen, Moresnet, and Sippenaeken.

The local language is Low Dietsch, a bridge dialect between East Limburgish and Ripuarian.

== Gallery ==
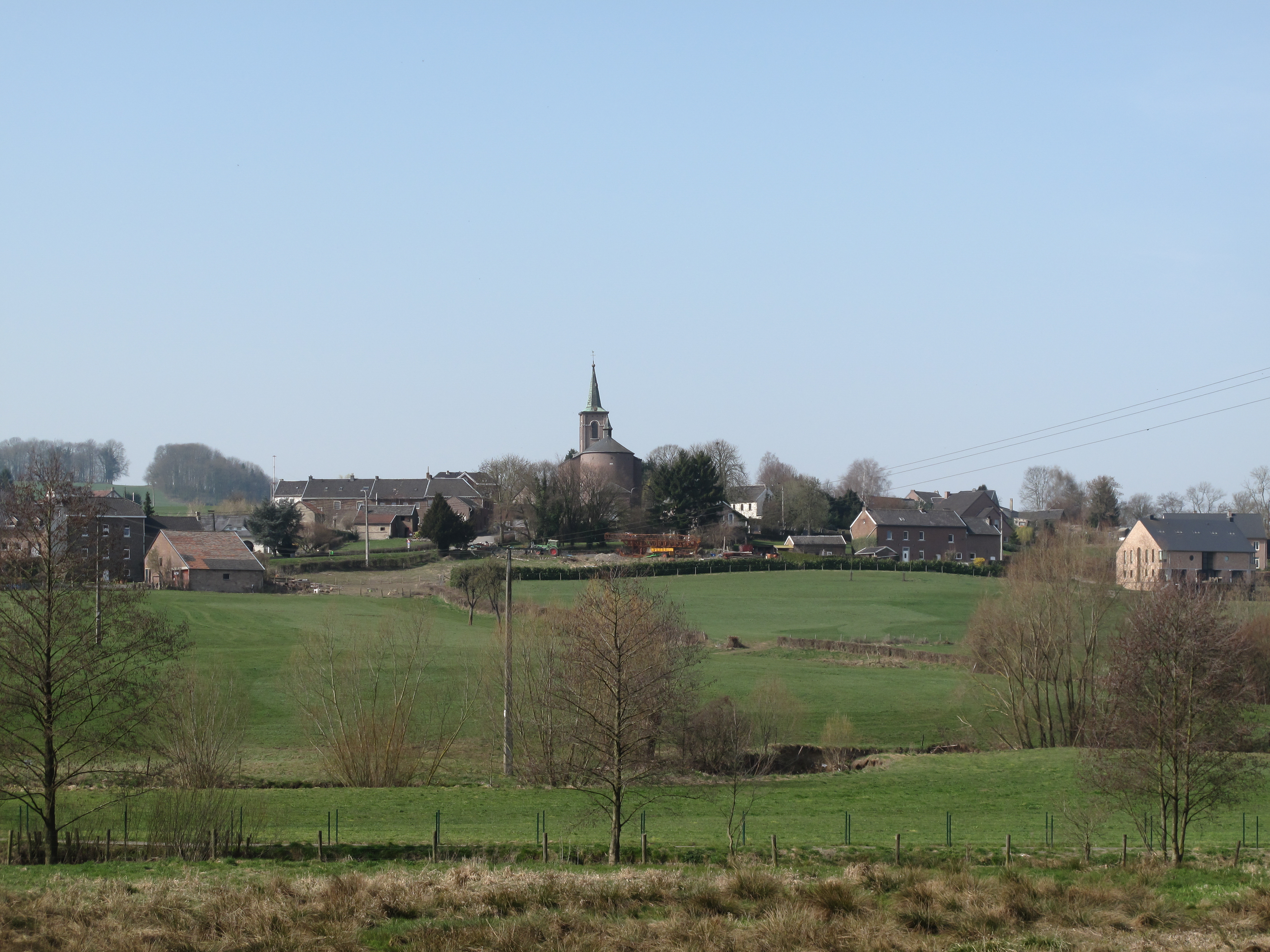
Sippenaeken, view to the village

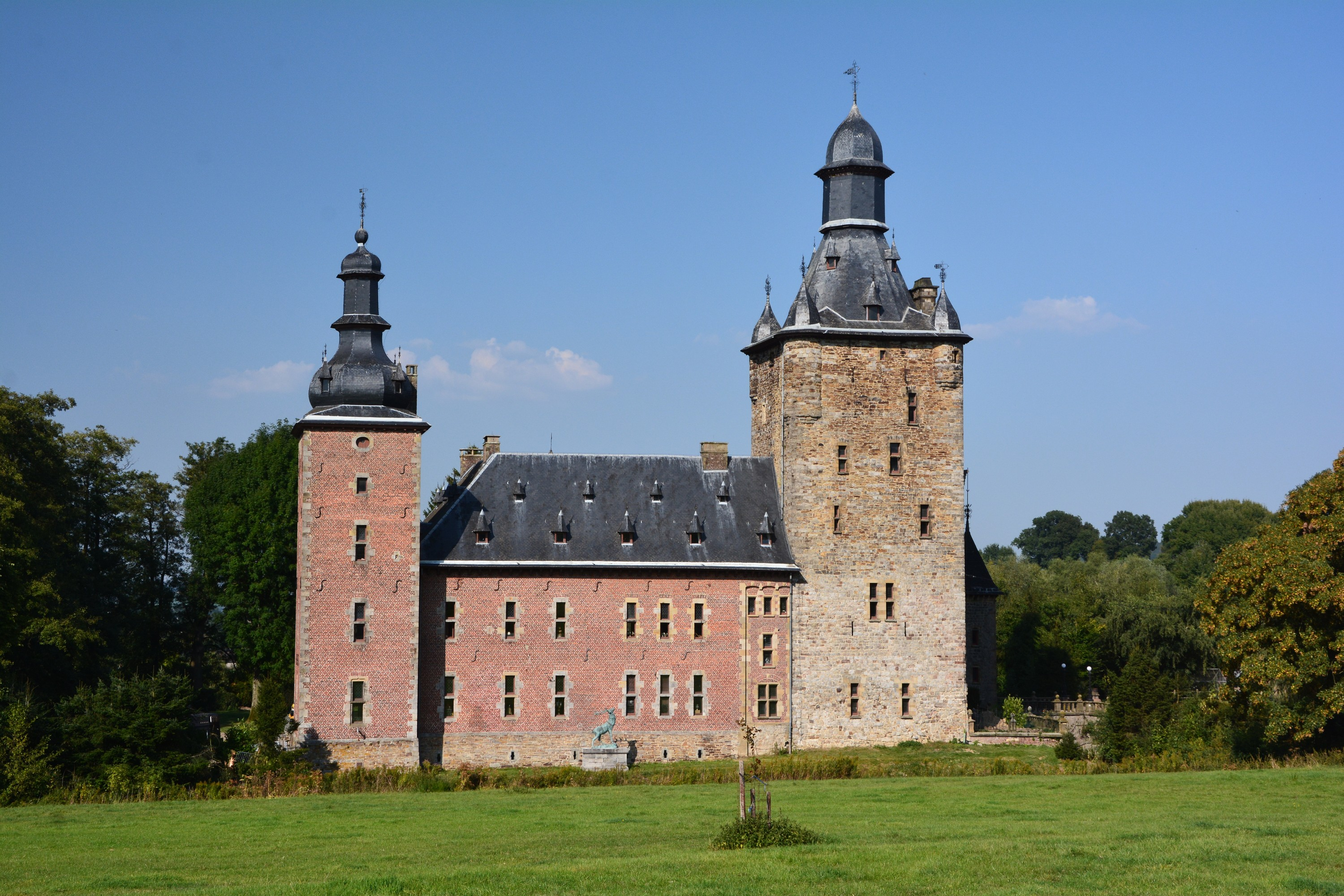
Beusdael Castle in Sippenaeken

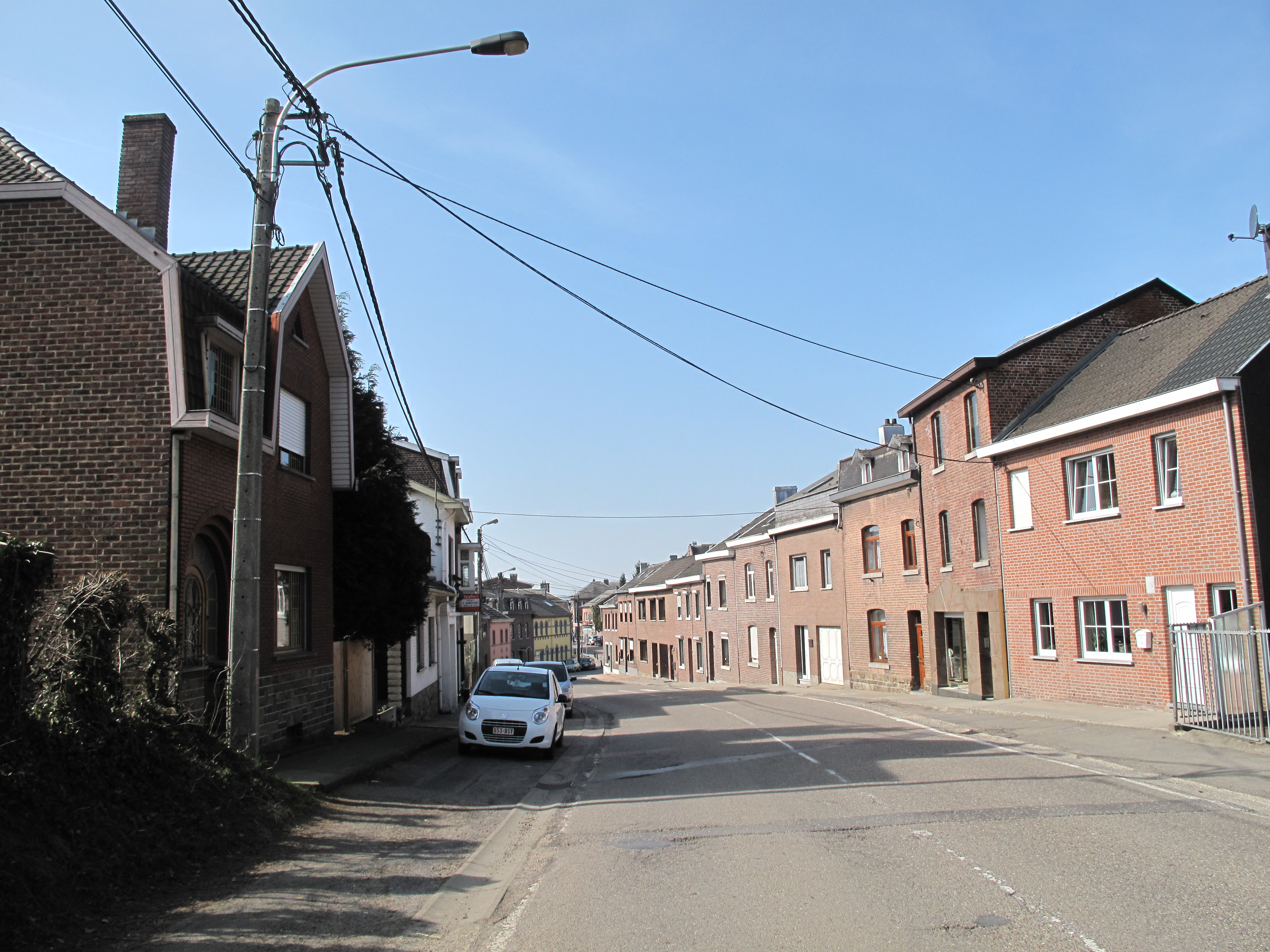
Gemmenich street

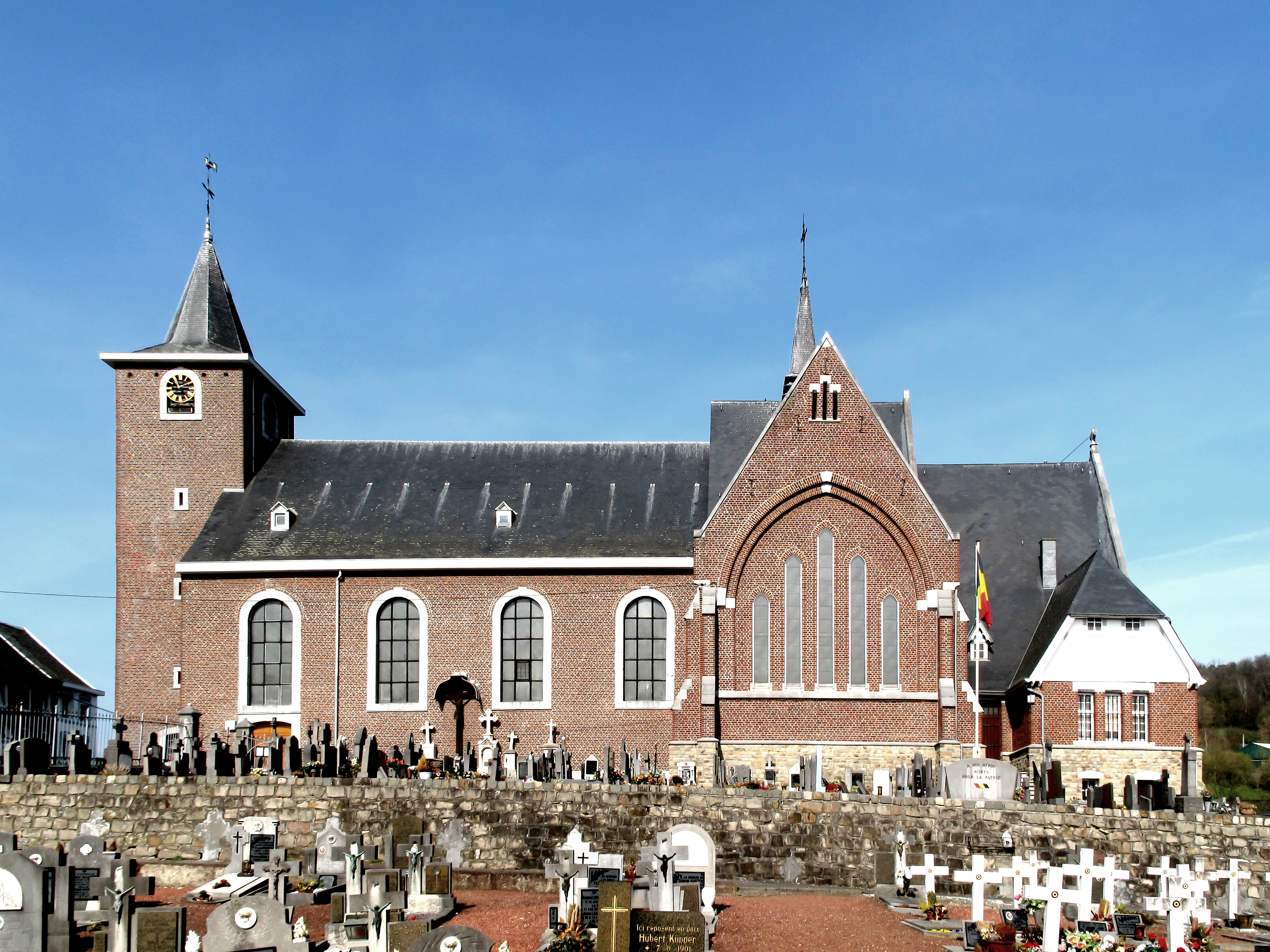
Gemmenich, church Saint-Hubert

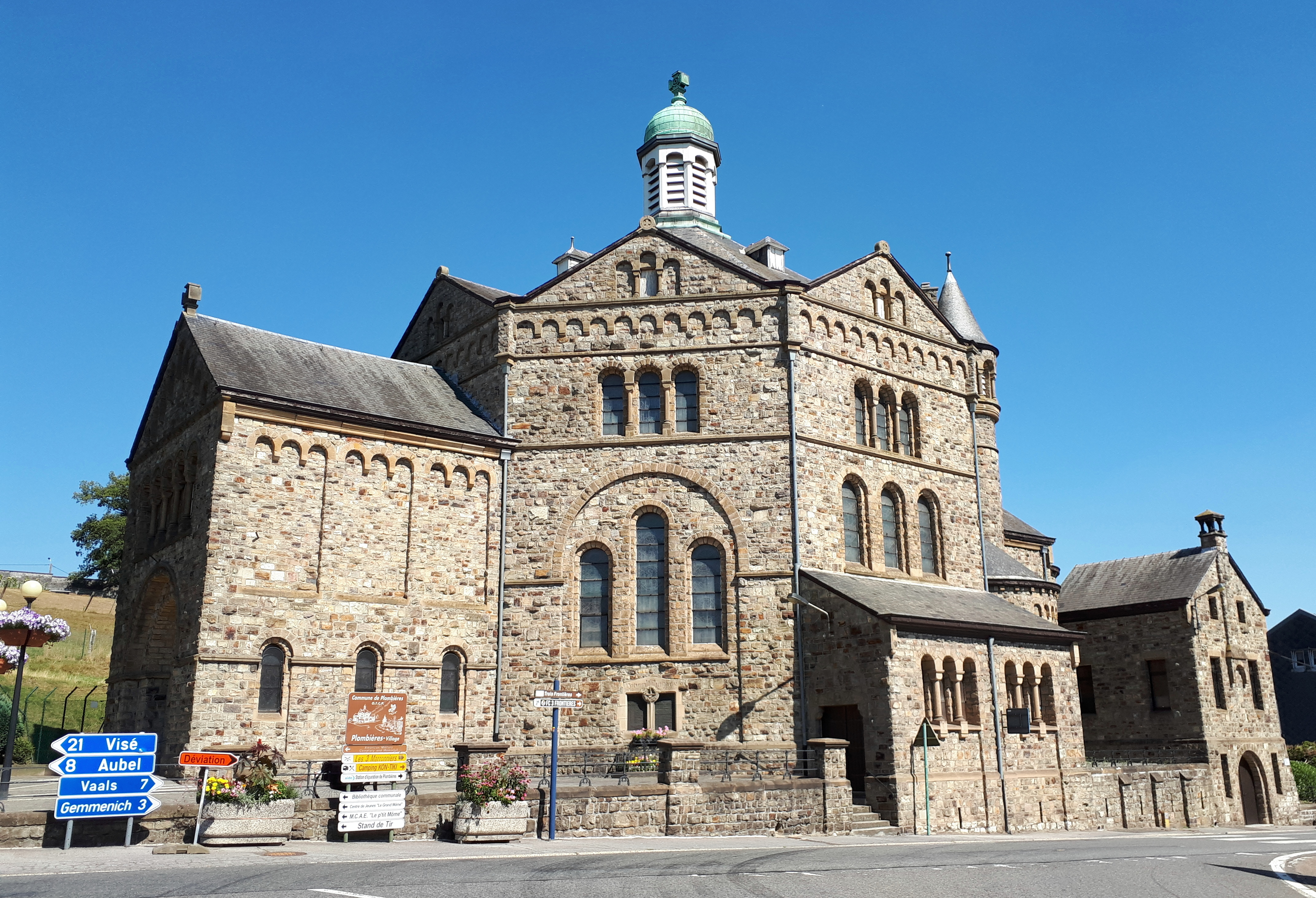
Notre-Dame de l'Assomption church

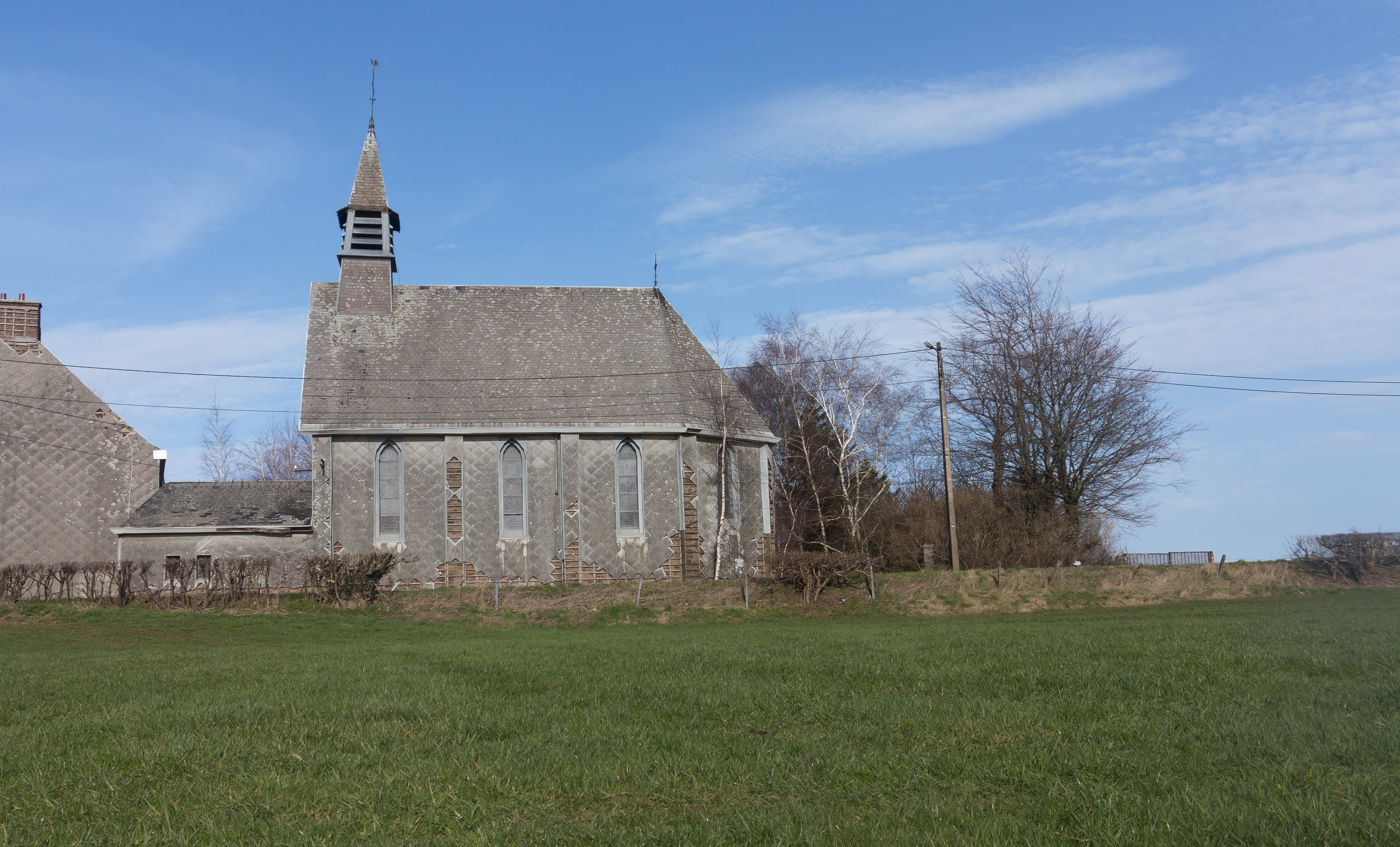
Church (l´église Agnus Dei) outside Hombourg

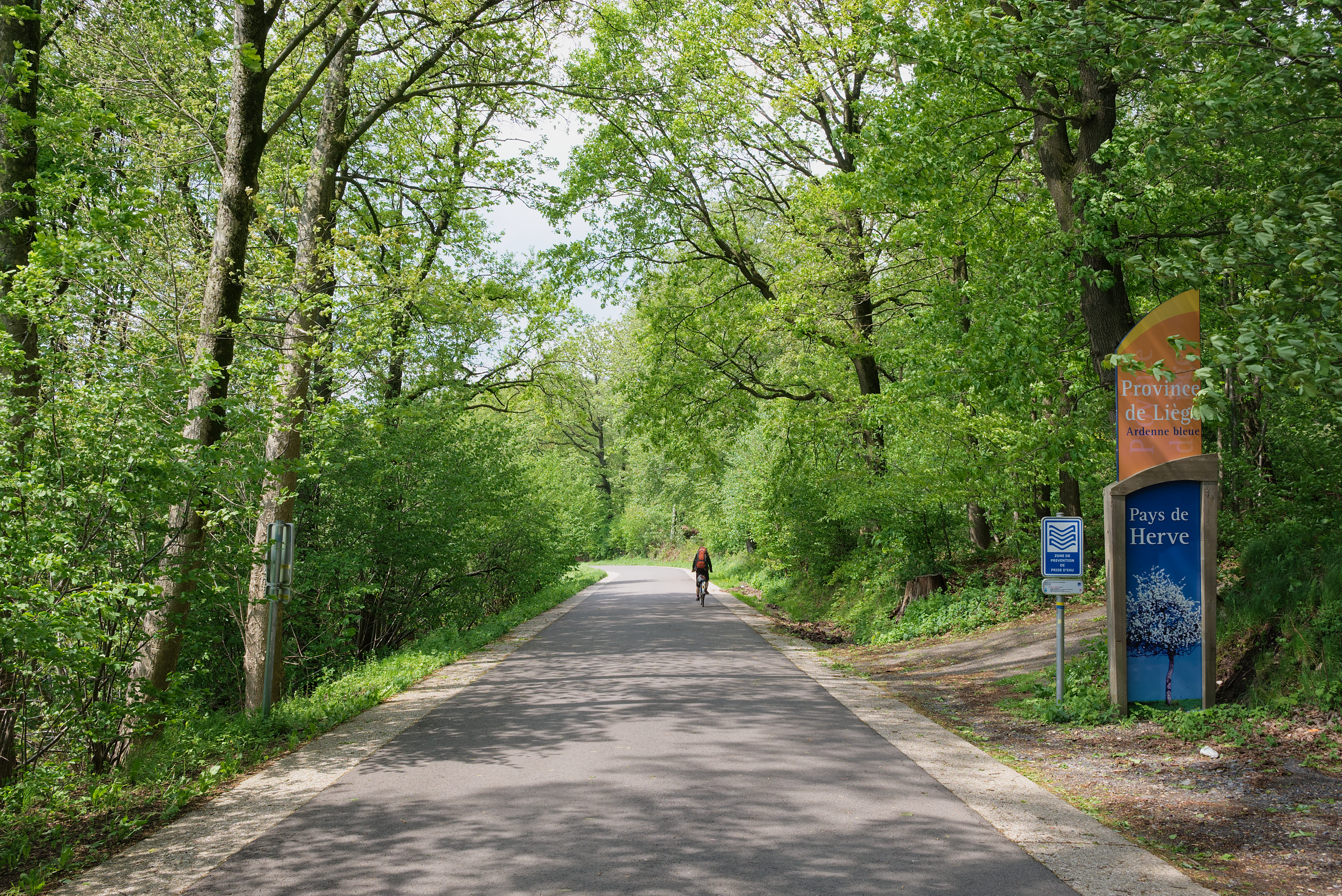
German border

== See also ==
- List of protected heritage sites in Plombières
- Viaduct of Moresnet
