= List of protected heritage sites in Plombières =

This table shows an overview of the protected heritage sites in the Walloon town Plombières. This list is part of Belgium's national heritage.

Object	Year/architect	Town/section	Address	Coordinates	Number^{?}	Image
Church Organs of Saint-Remy ^{(nl)} ^{(fr)}		Plombières	rue du Village, n°70	50.720954°N 5.988853°E	63088-CLT-0001-01 Info	
Church Saint-Etienne: Interior ^{(nl)} ^{(fr)}		Plombières		50.707806°N 5.962630°E	63088-CLT-0004-01 Info	Kerk Saint-Etienne: interieur More images
Streversdorp castle or Schlossgraaf ^{(nl)} ^{(fr)}		Plombières	rue du château de Graaf, n°74	50.699629°N 5.944719°E	63088-CLT-0005-01 Info	Kasteel Streversdorp of Schlossgraaf More images
Broich castle ^{(nl)} ^{(fr)}		Plombières	rue du château de Broich, n°36	50.705100°N 5.941840°E	63088-CLT-0006-01 Info	Kasteel Broich
Streversdorp castle with its surroundings ^{(nl)} ^{(fr)}		Plombières		50.699720°N 5.941488°E	63088-CLT-0007-01 Info	Ensemble van het kasteel Streversdorp met diens omgeving
Castle Beusdael except the gate, and the surrounding area ^{(nl)} ^{(fr)}		Plombières		50.751214°N 5.910517°E	63088-CLT-0010-01 Info	Kasteel van Beusdael, uitgezonderd het portaal, en het ensemble gevormd door het kasteel en het omliggende terrein More images
House: façades and roofs, except recent work on either side of the façade ^{(nl)} ^{(fr)}		Plombières	rue du Chemin de fer, n°25	50.733963°N 5.964594°E	63088-CLT-0011-01 Info	Huis: gevels en daken, behalve de recente aan weerszijde van de gevel
Chapel of the Castle: walls and roof ^{(nl)} ^{(fr)}		Plombières	rue du Château de Broich	50.704587°N 5.941810°E	63088-CLT-0012-01 Info	Kapel van het kasteel: gevels en dak More images
Veltjaeren Castle: walls and roofs, bridges, walls, and surroundings ^{(nl)} ^{(fr)}		Plombières	rue Vieljaren, n°8	50.708276°N 5.905204°E	63088-CLT-0013-01 Info	Kasteel Veltjaeren: gevels en daken, brug, muren en het ensemble van het kasteel met zijn omgeving More images
Gothic cross ^{(nl)} ^{(fr)}		Plombières	rue du Village (today rue du Centre)	50.723913°N 5.920372°E	63088-CLT-0014-01 Info	Gotisch kruis
Organs of the church Notre-Dame de l'Assomption ^{(nl)} ^{(fr)}		Plombières		50.738228°N 5.961144°E	63088-CLT-0015-01 Info	Orgels van kerk Notre-Dame de l’Assomption More images
House: everything with the exception of the extension at the rear of the barn ^{(nl)}		Plombières	rue du Village, n°24/25 (today rue du Centre, n°65-67)	50.722882°N 5.921166°E	63088-CLT-0016-01 Info	Huis: zijgevels, dak en ensemble van het geheel, met uitzondering van de aanbouw aan de achterzijde van de schuur
Farm house: walls and roofs ^{(nl)} ^{(fr)}		Plombières	Kinkenweg no. 86	50.694398°N 5.940897°E	63088-CLT-0017-01 Info	Huis van boerderij: gevels en daken, Kinkenweg n°86
Certain parts of the building, rue de Moresnet n ° 17-19 ^{(nl)} ^{(fr)}		Plombières	G. Demoulin Rue No.'s 31 and 37, directtion of Savoir	50.709491°N 5.964258°E	63088-CLT-0018-01 Info	Bepaalde delen van het gebouw, rue de Moresnet n°17-19 (op dit moment rue G. Demoulin n°s 31 en 37) te Savoir
Home: walls, roofs and latrines on the facade facing the street ^{(nl)} ^{(fr)}		Plombières	rue G. Demoulin, n°4 (formerly called "place communale n°43") (M) et établissement d'une zone de protection (ZP)	50.707673°N 5.963663°E	63088-CLT-0019-01 Info	Huis: gevels, daken en latrine aan de gevel aan de straatzijde
Alensberg Castle: fifteenth century roofs, farm (bakery) on the Rue du Village n ° 11, and the exterior of the old farmhouse Langhaag Street No. 4 and park Alensberg ^{(nl)} ^{(fr)}		Plombières	rue Langhaag n°4 (EA)	50.719608°N 5.981077°E	63088-CLT-0020-01 Info	Kasteel Alensberg: De hele donjon van het vijftiende eeuwse kasteel, oude delen en boerderij=bakkerij aan de Rue du Village n°11 en het exterieur van de oude boerderij Langhaag Street n°4 (EA) en het park Alensberg More images
American Military Cemetery Hombourg-Vogelzanck and its surroundings ^{(nl)} ^{(fr)}		Plombières		50.708112°N 5.889368°E	63088-CLT-0021-01 Info	Militaire Amerikaanse Begraafplaats Hombourg-Vogelzanck en zijn omgeving More images

== See also ==
- List of protected heritage sites in Liège (province)
- Plombières
