= Guy W. S. Castle =

US Navy officer and recipient of the Medal of Honor (1879–1919)

Guy Wilkinson Stuart Castle
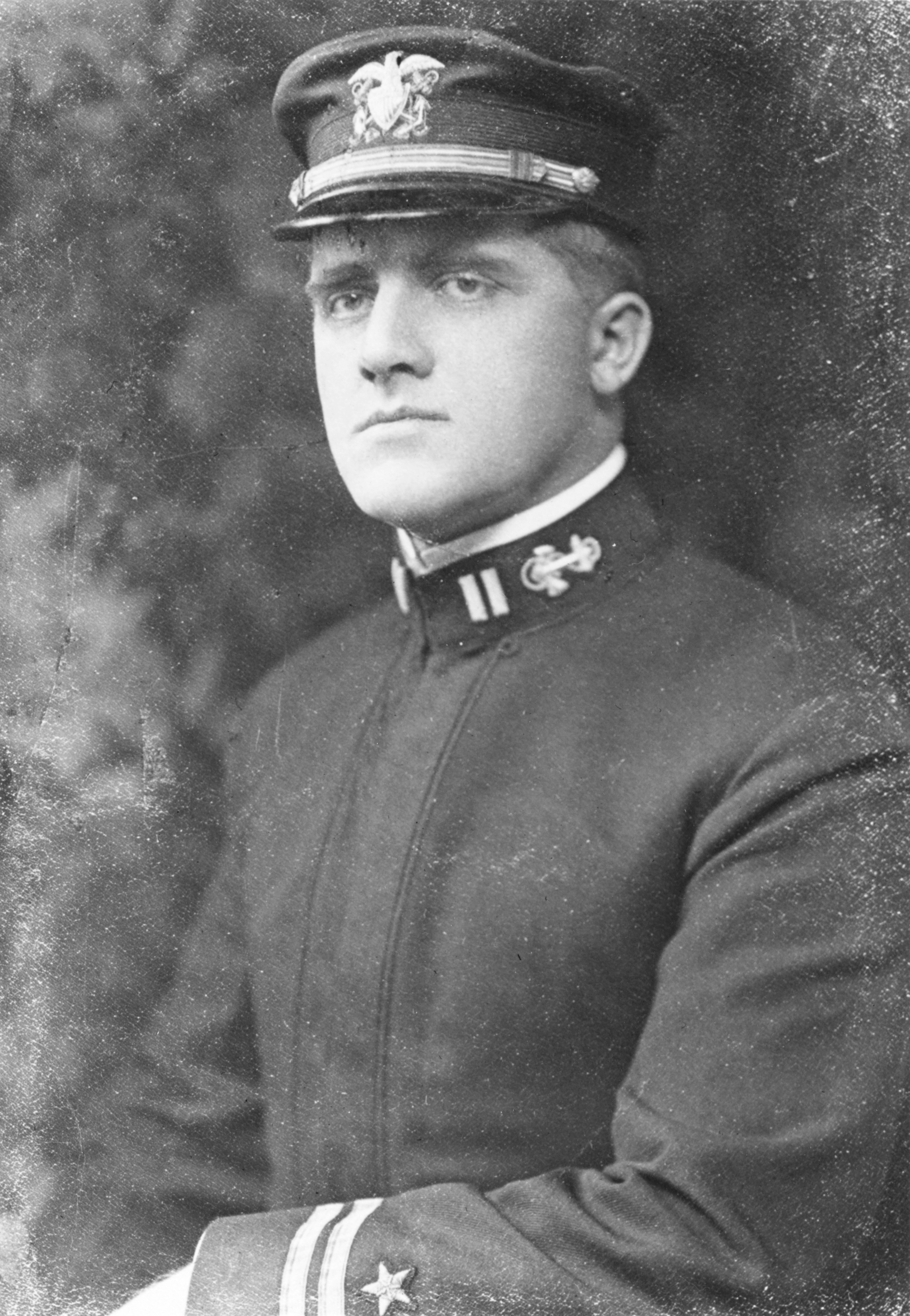
- Guy Castle as a lieutenant
- Born: February 8, 1879; Portage, Wisconsin, US
- Died: August 10, 1919 (aged 40); At the North Atlantic
- Burial place: Arlington National Cemetery
- Military career
- Allegiance: United States of America
- Branch: United States Navy
- Service years: 1901–1919
- Rank: Commander
- Conflicts: Occupation of Veracruz
- Awards: Medal of Honor

Guy Wilkinson Stuart Castle (February 8, 1879 – August 10, 1919) was an officer of the United States Navy who received the Medal of Honor for his actions during the United States occupation, of Veracruz, Mexico, in 1914. He is the uncle of Medal of Honor recipient Frederick Walker Castle.

== Birth and education ==
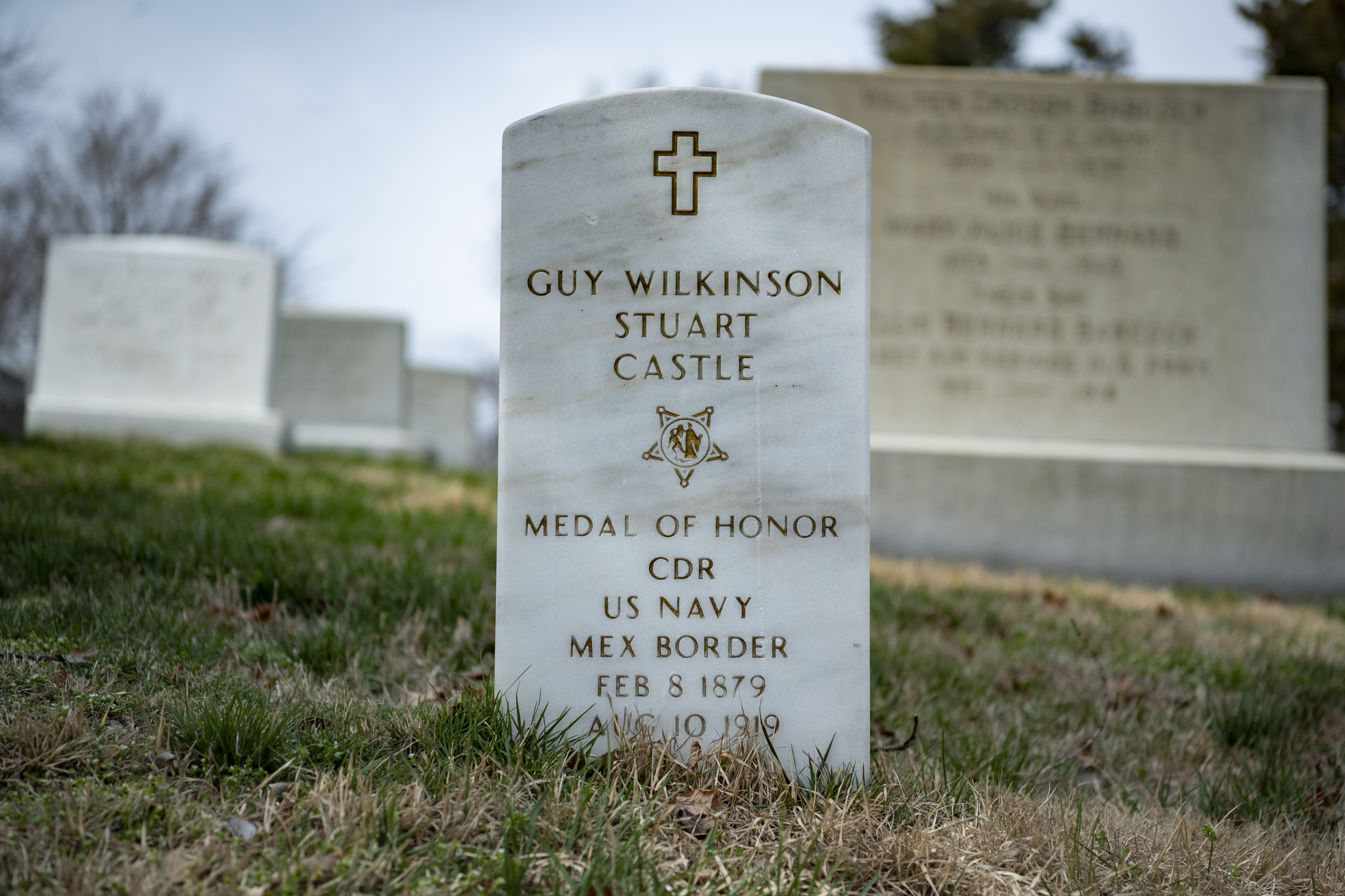
Grave at Arlington National Cemetery

Guy Wilkinson Stuart Castle was born in Portage, Wisconsin, on 8 February 1879 or 8 February 1880. He was appointed a naval cadet at the United States Naval Academy in Annapolis, Maryland, on 20 May 1897. While at the Naval Academy, Castle was nicknamed "Hoot," "Pub," or "Jim," and came to be nicknamed "the Great Stone Face." He graduated from the Naval Academy on 7 June 1901.

== Military career ==
=== Early career, 1901–1903 ===
Castle reported to the receiving ship USS Independence on 29 June 1901. Detached on 31 July 1901, he departed the next day for the Asiatic Station on board a United States Army Transport. Ultimately, he reported to armored cruiser USS Brooklyn on 6 September, but served in her only for a little over a month, being detached to the battleship USS Kentucky on 11 October.

His title changed from naval cadet to midshipman on 1 July 1902, Castle was ordered detached from Kentucky on 21 July 1902 to the gunboat USS Monocacy, then to the gunboat USS Vicksburg, reporting to Vicksburg on 30 July at Chefoo, China. Over the ensuing months, Vicksburg "showed the flag" and conducted training, steaming from Chinese to Korean, Japanese, and Philippine ports. Tensions between Japan and Russia occasioned Vicksburg's being dispatched to Chemulpo, Korea, where she arrived on 30 December 1903 to protect American interests there.

=== Chemulpo, 1904 ===
Castle's promotion to ensign, retroactive to 7 June 1903, occurred on 5 February 1904, the same day that Japan and Russia broke off diplomatic relations. On 8 February, Japan declared war upon Russia, beginning the Russo-Japanese War; that day, a fleet commanded by Japanese Rear Admiral Uriu Sotokichi arrived off Chemulpo, then landed troops. The following morning, the Japanese issued a challenge to the two Russian warships in port, the steel-hulled protected cruiser Variag and the gunboat Koretz, neither of which had known war had been declared, that the Japanese would attack the Russians where they lay unless they stood out of port by noon to do battle. The Russian ships began clearing for action at 9:00 a.m., then gamely stood out, to the cheers of the neutrals. The Japanese opened fire at about 11:50 a.m. Within a half-hour, Variag and Koretz retired toward Chemulpo, the Japanese ceasing fire at 12:40 to avoid endangering neutral shipping. Variag, badly damaged and afire, had suffered heavy casualties; British, French, and Italian warships sent boats with medical personnel to lend assistance. Vicksburg sent a whaleboat to do likewise. Castle's participation in that endeavor prompted Variag's commanding officer to present his personal sword to the young ensign in gratitude.

=== Surface ship duty, 1904–1907 ===
Vicksburg returned to the United States on 29 June 1904, arriving at Bremerton, Washington, to be decommissioned. Detached from Vicksburg on 15 July, Castle returned home with 30 days leave. On 12 August, he received orders to join the protected cruiser USS Chicago, and reported aboard her on 22 August. Detached on 28 October, he reported to the store ship USS Celtic (AF-2) on 30 October, becoming her navigator on 21 November, then her senior engineer on 1 February 1906. On 11 August 1906, he received simultaneous promotions to lieutenant, junior grade and lieutenant.

=== Submarine duty, 1907–1909 ===
Detached to command the submarine USS Plunger on 22 February 1907, he reported for that duty on 23 February and assumed command upon her recommissioning at the New York Navy Yard in Brooklyn, New York. He received additional duty as commanding officer of USS Shark on 23 August. Detached from Plunger to "continue other duties" (perhaps to devise means related to the envisioned transfer of "submarine torpedo boats" to the Asiatic Station as deck cargo on board colliers) on 24 December, he then assigned to temporary duty at the Bureau of Navigation, reporting there on 25 April 1908, upon completion of which he traveled to Mare Island Navy Yard at Vallejo, California, where he would assigned to the submarine USS Pike. He reported on 13 May, only to be detached on 1 July to travel to the Asiatic Station for duty with a draft of men, taking passage on 6 July. He reported for duty on 4 August in connection with fitting out submarines USS Porpoise and Shark, both of which had been transported to Cavite Navy Yard on Luzon in the Philippine Islands as deck cargo on board the collier USS Caesar.

=== Battleship duty, 1909–1910 ===
Relieved on 9 July 1909 with new orders, Castle returned to the United States on 20 August, reporting to the battleship USS Ohio on 12 October to serve as her senior engineer officer. When Ohio was decommissioned a little over two months later, Castle received orders on 23 December to report without delay to the battleship USS New Jersey for duty as her senior engineer officer, boarding on 26 December. He remained on New Jersey until detached on 6 August 1910.

=== Shore duty, 1910–1913 ===
Castle traveled to Pittsburgh, Pennsylvania, to be the assistant to the inspector of material, Carbon Steel Works, reporting on 10 August 1910. More shore duty followed, at his alma mater, when he arrived at the United States Naval Academy on 26 August. He remained there for almost three years, interrupted by additional temporary duty on board the battleship USS Iowa during the midshipmen's summer cruise of 31 May to 11 September 1911, and in Philadelphia with the Brigade of Midshipmen on 25 November 1912.

=== Duty aboard USS Utah, 1913–1916 ===
Detached from the Naval Academy on 7 June 1913, he arrived on board the battleship USS Utah on 11 June to take up his duties as her ordnance officer.

=== Medal of Honor at Veracruz, 1914 ===
Less than a year later, as tensions flared between the United States and Mexico, Castle commanded Utah's bluejacket landing battalion (consisting of 17 officers and 367 enlisted men), which landed at Veracruz on 21 April 1914 as part of the First Seaman Regiment. During the fighting that day and the next, Castle's conduct proved exemplary, as he "exhibited courage and skill" in leading his men, "in seizing the Customs House [one of the principal objects of the landing] he encountered for many hours the heaviest and most pernicious concealed fire of the entire day 21 April 1914, but his courage and coolness under trying circumstances was marked ..." For his "distinguished conduct in battle," he received the Medal of Honor.

=== Shore duty, 1916–1918 ===
Commissioned lieutenant commander on 15 September 1914, retroactive to 1 July 1914, Castle left Utah on 11 May 1916, reporting to the Bureau of Steam Engineering in Washington, D.C., on 13 May. After serving as senior member of a board "to determine space and weight of various material features of submarine[s] to be built" on 20 July, he later participated in the deliberations of the board that investigated and reported on the classification and standardization of motors on board ships on 21 November 1916. After a brief tour of temporary duty with Rear Admiral William Sims, during which he took passage in torpedo boat USS Wilkes, Castle served on a board that evaluated "devices and plans connected with submarine warfare." On 31 August 1917, Castle received a temporary promotion to commander.

=== Commanding officer, USS Martha Washington, 1918–1919 ===
Ultimately, Castle's "urgent request" for World War I sea duty bore fruit, but the Armistice with Germany that ended hostilities World War I, however, took effect on 11 November 1918, a week before his detachment from the Bureau of Steam Engineering on 18 November with orders to report to the receiving ship at New York Navy Yard. Arriving there on 22 November, he relieved Captain Kenneth G. Castleman as commanding officer of the troop transport USS Martha Washington. Under Castle's command, Martha Washington conducted seven round-trip voyages to French, British, or Dutch ports, with New York City; Hampton Roads, Virginia, or Charleston, South Carolina, serving as the eastern termini.

== Suicide and burial ==
On 4 August 1919, Martha Washington departed New York City bound for Brest, France, on the first leg of a voyage that was ultimately to take her to Constantinople in the Ottoman Empire. On the evening of 10 August, when Castle did not show up at the scheduled time for dinner, his orderly and cabin steward found the door to the bathroom in his cabin locked. When repeated calls and knocking received no response, the orderly and cabin steward summoned the ship's senior surgeon and a captain's mate, who forced the door open. They found Castle dead on the floor of a self-inflicted gunshot wound. He had placed his wife's photograph inside his shirt over his heart and a picture of his two sons on the shelf in the bathroom opposite the mirror.

"During the voyage," Martha Washington's chronicler wrote, "no unusual actions of the Commanding Officer caused anyone to suspect that he contemplated such an action and his death was a great shock to both his officers and men ... Captain Castle was held in the highest esteem by the officers and men of this vessel, who sincerely mourn his death, with his bereaved family."

Castle was buried at Arlington National Cemetery in Arlington, Virginia.

Commander Castle was a member of the General Society of Colonial Wars.

== Awards and decorations ==
=== Medal of Honor citation ===
Medal of Honor citation:

For distinguished conduct in battle, engagements of Vera Cruz, 21 and April 22, 1914. Eminent and conspicuous in command of his battalion, Lt. Castle was in the fighting of both days, and exhibited courage and skill in leading his men through action. In seizing the customhouse, he encountered for many hours the heaviest and most pernicious concealed fire of the entire day, but his courage and coolness under trying conditions were marked.

=== Namesake ===
A United States Navy destroyer to be named in Commander Castle's honor, USS Castle (DD-720), was authorized on 9 July 1942, and her keel laid on 11 July 1945. With the end of World War II in August, construction was terminated on 11 February 1946 and she was delivered in a partially completed status to the 3rd Naval District on 15 August. She was stricken from the Navy List on 2 November 1954 and sold incomplete for scrapping on 29 August 1955.

== See also ==
- List of Medal of Honor recipients (Veracruz)
