= Frederick Walker Castle =

United States Army Air Forces Medal of Honor recipient

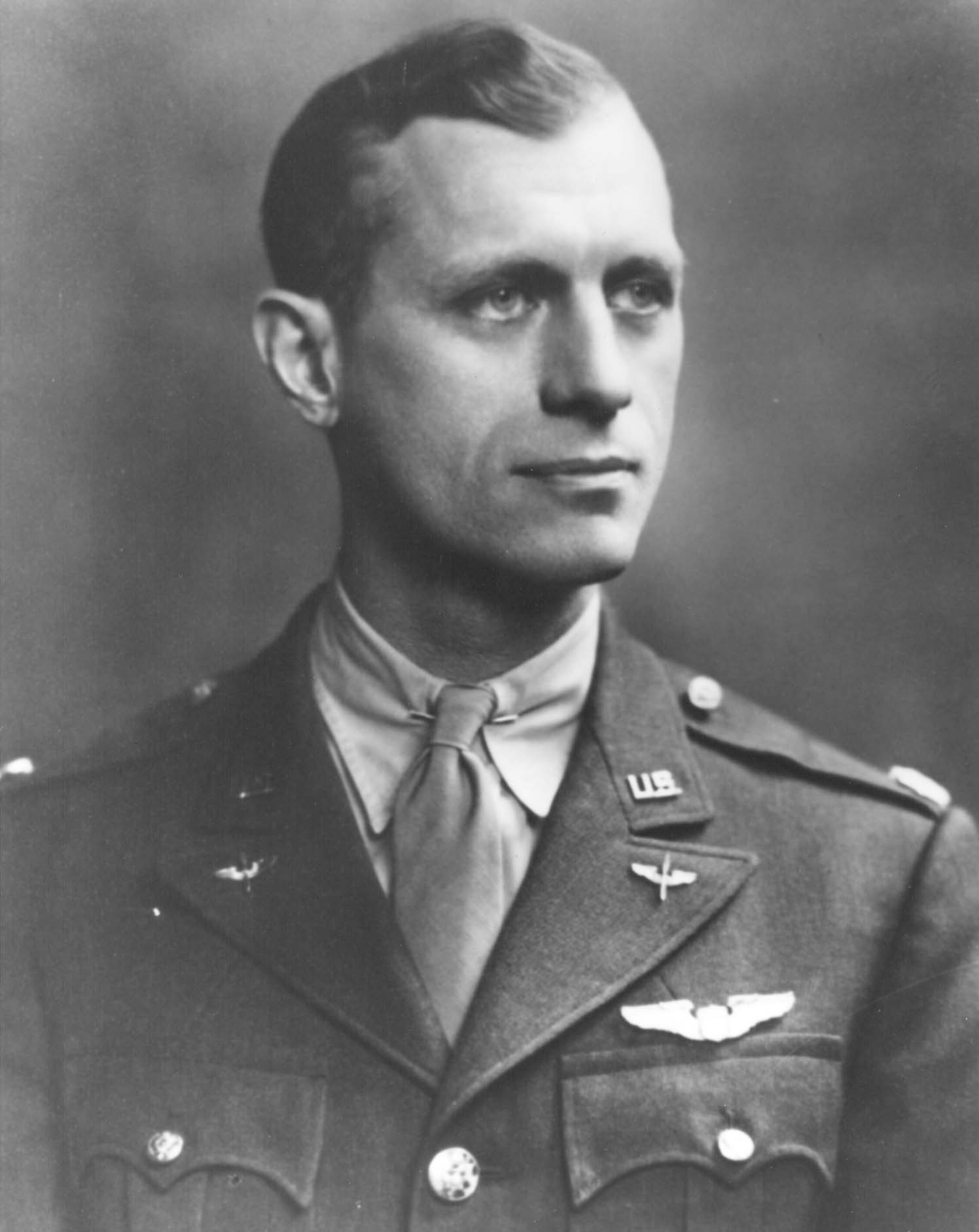
- Born: October 14, 1908; Fort William McKinley, Taguig, Philippines
- Died: December 24, 1944 (aged 36); Hods, Belgium
- Burial place: Henri-Chapelle American Cemetery and Memorial, Belgium
- Military career
- Allegiance: United States of America
- Branch: United States Army Air Forces
- Service years: 1930 - 1934, 1942 - 1944
- Rank: Brigadier General
- Service number: O-319375
- Commands: 94th Bombardment Group; 4th Combat Bombardment Wing
- Conflicts: World War II †
- Awards: Medal of Honor; Silver Star; Legion of Merit; Distinguished Flying Cross (4); Purple Heart; Air Medal (5); Croix de Guerre; Legion of Honor; Order of Kutuzov Third Class (USSR)

Frederick Walker Castle (October 14, 1908–December 24, 1944) was a general officer in the U.S. Army Air Forces during World War II, and a recipient of the Medal of Honor. He was killed in action leading the bombing mission for which he was awarded the Medal of Honor. He is the nephew of Medal of Honor recipient Guy W. S. Castle.

== Background ==
Castle was born at Fort William McKinley in Taguig, the Philippines, on October 14, 1908. The son of 2nd Lt. Benjamin F. Castle, Frederick Castle was the first child born to a graduate of the West Point Class of 1907, thereby becoming the class godson. Among his godfathers in the Class of 1907, also stationed in the Philippines, was 2nd Lt. Henry H. "Hap" Arnold, who would go on to become General of the Army, as well as the first and only General of the Air Force to date. Benjamin F. Castle was a friend of Arnold and later became Aviation Attaché in Paris following World War I, leaving the Army as a colonel in 1919.

Castle settled with his family in Mountain Lakes, New Jersey, after World War I, and he attended Boonton High School and Storm King Military Academy.

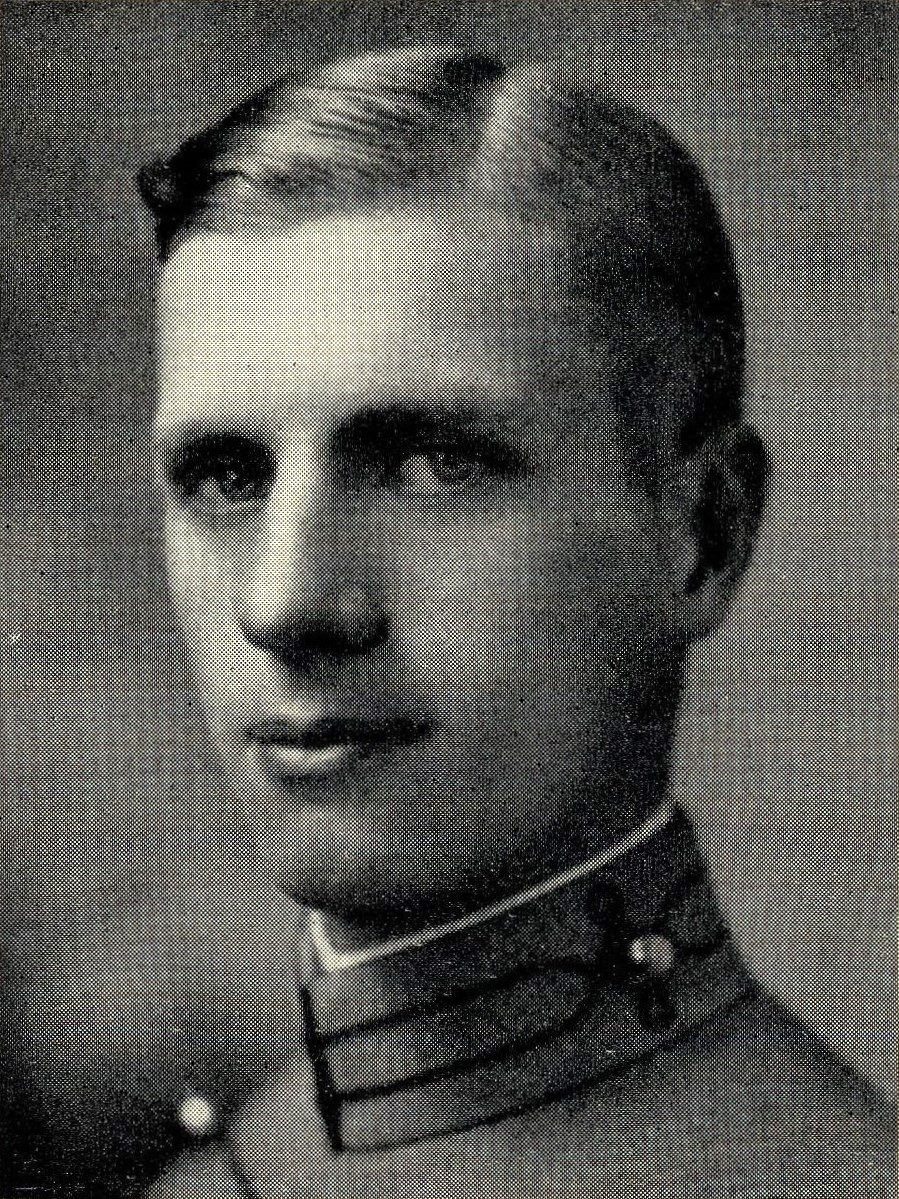
West Point Yearbook photo

Castle entered the New Jersey National Guard on October 2, 1924, as preparation for attending West Point, scoring first on the Guard's competitive examination. He entered the U.S. Military Academy on July 1, 1926, graduating June 12, 1930, 7th in a class of 241 graduates. He was commissioned a 2nd Lieutenant in the Corps of Engineers and was accepted for pilot training at March Field, California. After earning his wings on December 22, 1931, at Kelly Field, Texas, he served as a pilot in the 17th Pursuit Squadron at Selfridge Field, Michigan, before being assigned to the Civilian Conservation Corps. He resigned from full-time Army service on February 17, 1934, to take a job with Allied Chemical and Dye Corporation, but continued to hold a commission as an officer in the Organized Reserve.

The business skills he developed with Allied brought him an offer to join Sperry Gyroscope Company in September 1938 as an assistant to the company president. Sperry was a military-related industry, and its work in developing both electrically powered gun turrets for bombers and the Norden bombsight brought him to the attention of his godfather, General Arnold, by then the Chief of the United States Army Air Corps.

== "Eaker's Amateurs" ==
Shortly after the United States entered World War II, Brigadier General Ira Eaker was made head of the prospective heavy bomber force slated to be stationed in England. Eaker was ordered to England in January 1942 and put together a small staff to accompany him. One member, Lt. Harris Hull, had worked for Sperry Gyroscope as a civilian and recommended Castle as an addition. Eaker had General Arnold recall Castle to duty as a captain on January 19, 1942, to be assigned to organizing bases and supply depots for the new Eighth Air Force.

Eaker and his staff of six (dubbed "Eaker's Amateurs") arrived in England by way of neutral Portugal on February 20, 1942. Within one month, Castle had been promoted to major, and on January 1, 1943, he was promoted to full colonel, and he assumed the position of Air Chief of Supply (A-4) for the Eighth Air Force.

Like many staff officers, Castle wanted a combat command and promoted himself to General Eaker to obtain one. In May 1943, the Eighth Air Force had doubled the size of its bomber force from four to eight B-17 Flying Fortress groups. In two of the new groups losses had been so severe at the outset that Eaker replaced their commanders with two members of his staff, one of whom was Colonel Castle. On June 19, 1943, Castle was given command of the 94th Bomb Group at Rougham (Bury St. Edmunds), and while the morale crisis in the 94th was not as severe, the situation was very similar to one earlier that year in which Colonel Frank A. Armstrong had taken command of the 306th Bomb Group (a situation which was the basis for the book, film, television series and comic book Twelve O'Clock High).

As with Armstrong, Castle experienced difficulties in raising the efficiency and training level of his group. He was aloof by nature and delegated many tasks to other officers, which were viewed initially by many in his command as weaknesses. He also was a novice bomber pilot, learning the task on the job as commander. Gradually, however, his leadership created positive results. On July 28, 1943, he led a deep-strike mission into Germany to bomb the Focke Wulf fighter manufacturing plant at Oschersleben. Poor weather conditions broke up the bomber formation, leaving the 94th Group and a few stragglers from other groups to attack the target alone. The incident was fictionalized in Twelve O'Clock High, and Castle was awarded the Silver Star.

Castle continued as commander of the 94th Bomb Group until April 14, 1944, when he was made commander of the 4th Combat Bomb Wing, a higher echelon that included his former group command. In November, his wing command was increased from three to five groups, and on November 20, 1944, he was promoted to brigadier general at the age of 36, making him one of the youngest generals in World War II.

Nazi Germany launched its Ardennes Offensive, known more familiarly as the "Battle of the Bulge", on December 16, choosing a week of particularly bad weather to disrupt superior Allied airpower. On December 23, the weather began to clear and the next day the largest U.S. air strike operation of the war was launched from England, comprising 2,046 heavy bombers and 853 fighters. When the 4th CBW was assigned to lead the 3d Air Division, which in turn was to lead the entire Eighth Air Force on the mission, General Castle assigned himself to lead the wing.

== Medal of Honor action ==
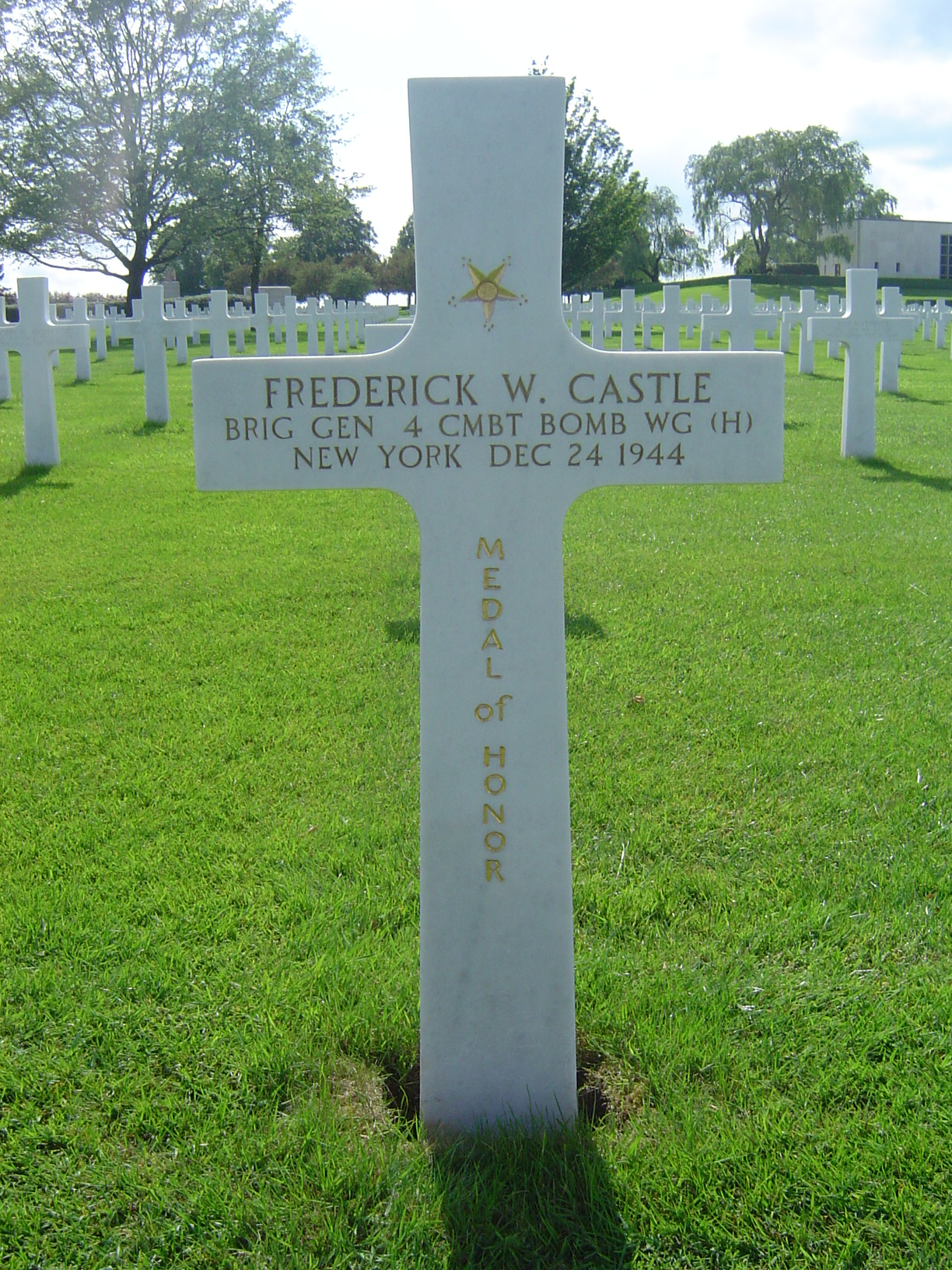
Grave of Brigadier General Frederick Walker Castle in the American Military Cemetery of Hombourg (Henri-Chapelle), province of Liège, Belgium. Grave location: D13/53.

On December 24, 1944, Castle flew as co-pilot on the lead aircraft of the 487th Bomb Group from RAF Lavenham, England, on his 30th combat mission. His B-17G Flying Fortress was serial number 44-8444, which the crew had called Treble Four because of the last three serial numbers of the aircraft. The mission consisted in bombing the Babenhausen airfield in Germany. The mission fell fifteen minutes behind schedule because of problems assembling the massive force, and the 487th missed its rendezvous with escorting P-51 fighters because the fighters were late in arriving due to the weather. The lead bomber also experienced an intermittent problem with one of its four engines and was attacked by German Bf 109 fighters while still over Allied-held territory in Belgium. The Bomb Group's assailants were JG 3, led by Heinz Bär, and supported by JG 6 and JG 27.

Castle's bomber fell away from the formation almost immediately and he instructed the deputy commander by radio to take over the lead. The B-17 struggled with control and moved some distance away from the protection of the bomber force, where it was again attacked. The pilots attempted to return to the bomber column but a third attack set both engines on the right wing on fire. Castle ordered the bomber abandoned but it spun into a dive. The pilots recovered from the dive and seven of the nine crewmen parachuted. The pilot was observed in the nose of the airplane hooking on his parachute, with Castle still at the controls, when the fuel tank in the burning right wing exploded, putting the B-17 into a spin from which it did not recover, crashing near Hody, Belgium. Of the nine crewmen, five survived the crash.

Frederick W. Castle was interred at the American Cemetery and Memorial at Henri-Chapelle, province of Liège, Belgium.

== Awards and honors ==
Castle's ribbon rack:

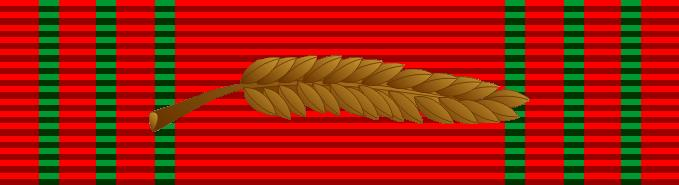

Army Air Forces Command Pilot Badge
Medal of Honor	Silver Star	Legion of Merit
Distinguished Flying Cross with three bronze oak leaf clusters	Purple Heart	Air Medal with four bronze oak leaf clusters
American Defense Service Medal	American Campaign Medal	European–African–Middle Eastern Campaign Medal with one silver and three bronze campaign stars
World War II Victory Medal	Légion d'honneur Knight (France)	WWII Croix de Guerre with bronze Palm (France)
Croix de Guerre with bronze Palm (Belgium)	Virtuti Militari; Silver Cross (Poland)	Order of Kutuzov Third Class (Union of Soviet Socialist Republics)

=== Medal of Honor citation ===
Frederick W. Castle

Rank and organization: Brigadier General. Assistant Commander, 4th Combat Bomb Wing, U.S. Army Air Corps. Place and date: Germany, December 24, 1944. Entered service at: Mountain Lake, N.J. Born: October 14, 1908, Manila P.I. G.O. No. 22, February 28, 1947.

Citation:

He was air commander and leader of more than 2,000 heavy bombers in a strike against German airfields on 24 December 1944. En route to the target, the failure of 1 engine forced him to relinquish his place at the head of the formation. In order not to endanger friendly troops on the ground below, he refused to jettison his bombs to gain speed maneuverability. His lagging, unescorted aircraft became the target of numerous enemy fighters which ripped the left wing with cannon shells, set the oxygen system afire, and wounded 2 members of the crew. Repeated attacks started fires in 2 engines, leaving the Flying Fortress in imminent danger of exploding. Realizing the hopelessness of the situation, the bail-out order was given. Without regard for his personal safety he gallantly remained alone at the controls to afford all other crewmembers an opportunity to escape. Still another attack exploded gasoline tanks in the right wing, and the bomber plunged earthward, carrying Gen. Castle to his death. His intrepidity and willing sacrifice of his life to save members of the crew were in keeping with the highest traditions of the military service.

=== Legacy ===
Merced Army Airfield in Merced, California, was renamed Castle Field in honor of Brigadier General Castle. With the establishment of an independent U.S. Air Force in 1947, it was renamed Castle Air Force Base and served through most of its existence as a Strategic Air Command bomber base. Castle AFB was closed 30 September 1995 due to a 1991 BRAC decision and is currently known as Castle Airport Aviation and Development Center. The colocated Castle Air Museum also retains Brigadier General Castle's name.

== See also ==
- List of Medal of Honor recipients for World War II
