= Henri-Chapelle American Cemetery and Memorial =

ABMC World War II cemetery in Liège, Belgium

- American Battle Monuments Commission
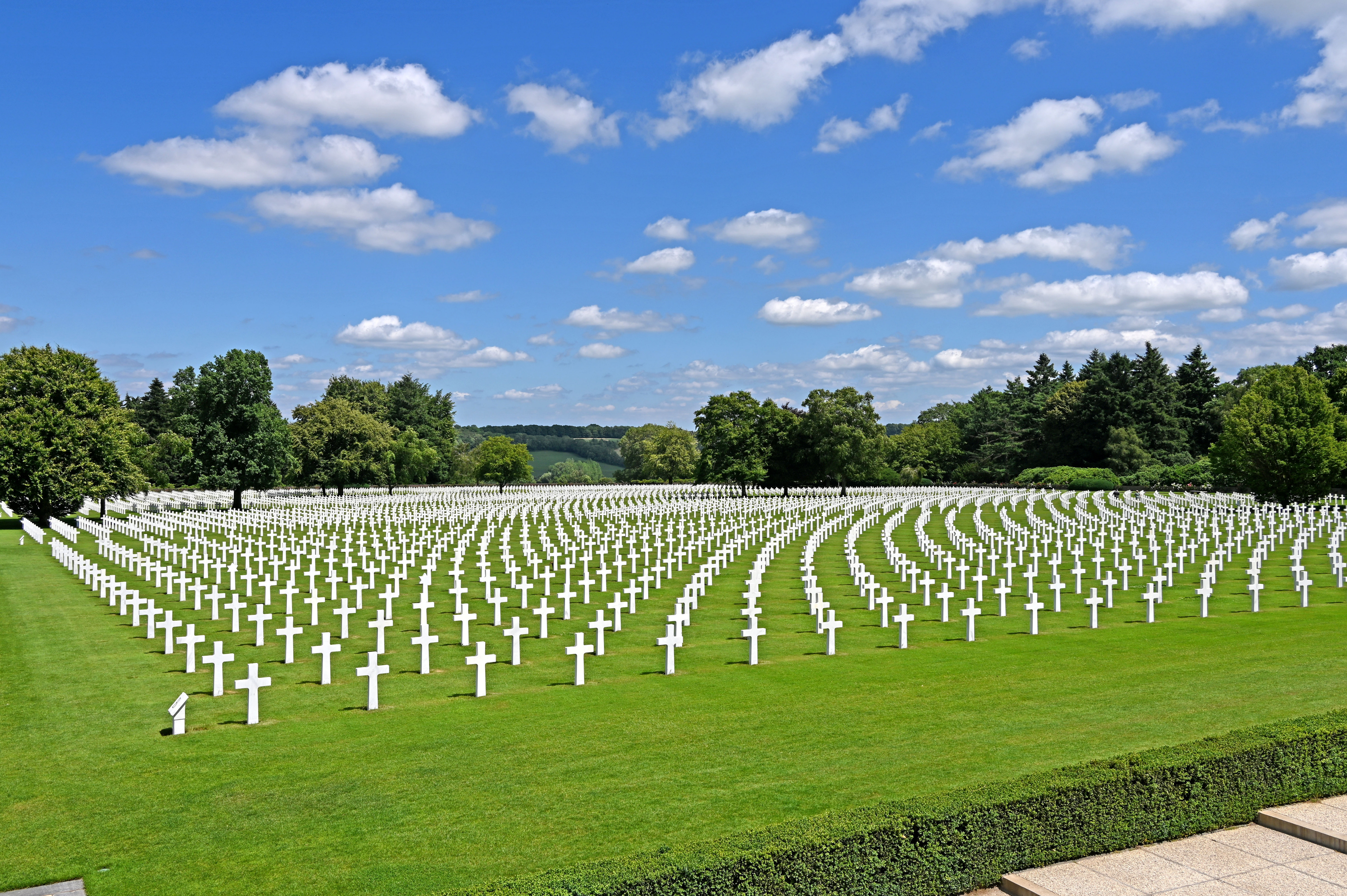
- Used for those deceased 1941–1945
- Established: 1945
- Location: 50.697°N 5.900°E near Welkenraedt, Belgium
- Designed by: Holabird, Root and Burgee of Chicago, Illinois; Franz Lipp of Chicago, Illinois (landscaping)
- Total burials: 7,992
- Unknowns: 94

Henri-Chapelle American Cemetery and Memorial is a Second World War American military war grave cemetery in eastern Belgium. It is 3 km (2 mi) northwest of Henri-Chapelle, about 30 km (20 mi) east of Liège. Dedicated in 1960, the cemetery contains 7,992 American war dead and covers 57 acres (23 ha).

One of three American war cemeteries in Belgium (along with the Ardennes American Cemetery and Flanders Field) it is administered by the American Battle Monuments Commission (ABMC).

== History ==
The majority of the fallen buried at Henri-Chapelle were killed during the Allied push in Germany during late 1944 and early 1945. The fallen from two key military engagements fill the cemetery; the First United States Army's drive through northern France, Belgium, Netherlands, and Luxembourg into Germany in September 1944; and the Battle of the Bulge (including the Battle of Hurtgen Forest and later taking of Aachen).

Following the war, the American Graves Registration Service began to repatriate the bodies to the United States. Disinterments began on 27 July 1947, and the first shipment of bodies left the Belgian port of Antwerp in October 1947. The moment was marked by a large commemoration attended by over 30,000 Belgian citizens.

== Layout ==
The cemetery placed graves in arcs across gently sloping lawns, and a central road passes through the cemetery. There is a chapel and visitor center containing carved granite maps showing the advance of U.S. forces across Belgium and into Germany. A colonnade features the names of 450 missing U.S. service personnel (a bronze rosette next to a name identifies a person who has since been located or identified).

The statue Angel of Peace, created by Donal Hord, was unveiled at the cemetery in 1956.

== Notable burials ==
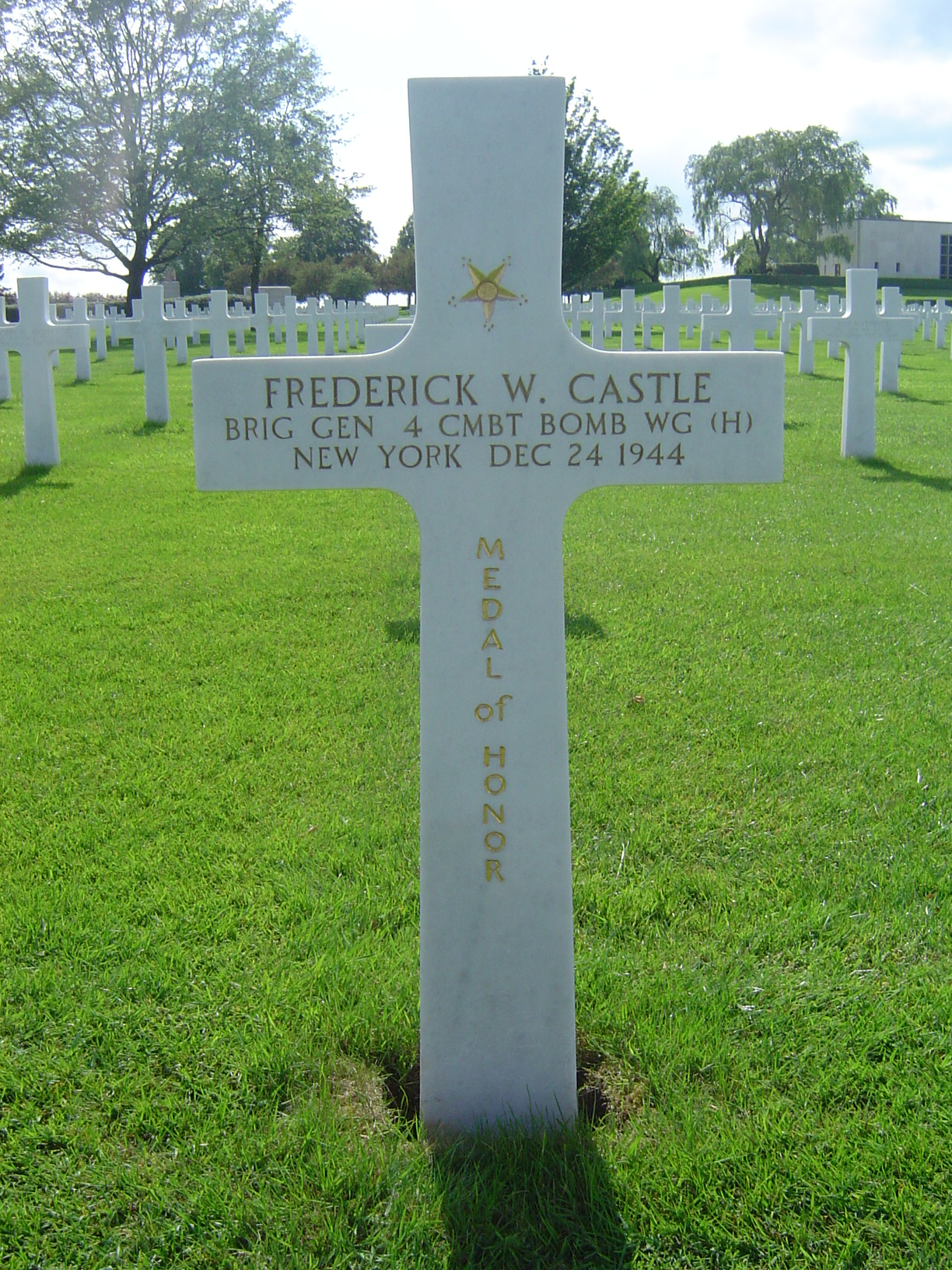
Grave of General Castle, the highest ranking U.S. soldier buried at Henri-Chapelle

Several Medal of Honor recipients are buried in the cemetery:

- Brigadier General Frederick W. Castle (1908–1944 †), for action as an Army Air Forces B-17 pilot, the highest in rank buried at Henri-Chapelle; namesake of Castle Air Force Base
- T/4 Truman C. Kimbro (1919–1944 †), for action against enemy forces in Belgium
- PFC Francis X. McGraw (1918–1944 †), for action against enemy forces in Germany

Other notables:

- Lt. William Nellis (1916–1944 †), USAAF P-47 pilot and namesake of Nellis Air Force Base
