= Henri-Chapelle =

Section of Welkenraedt, Wallonia, Belgium

Coordinates: 50°41′N 5°56′E

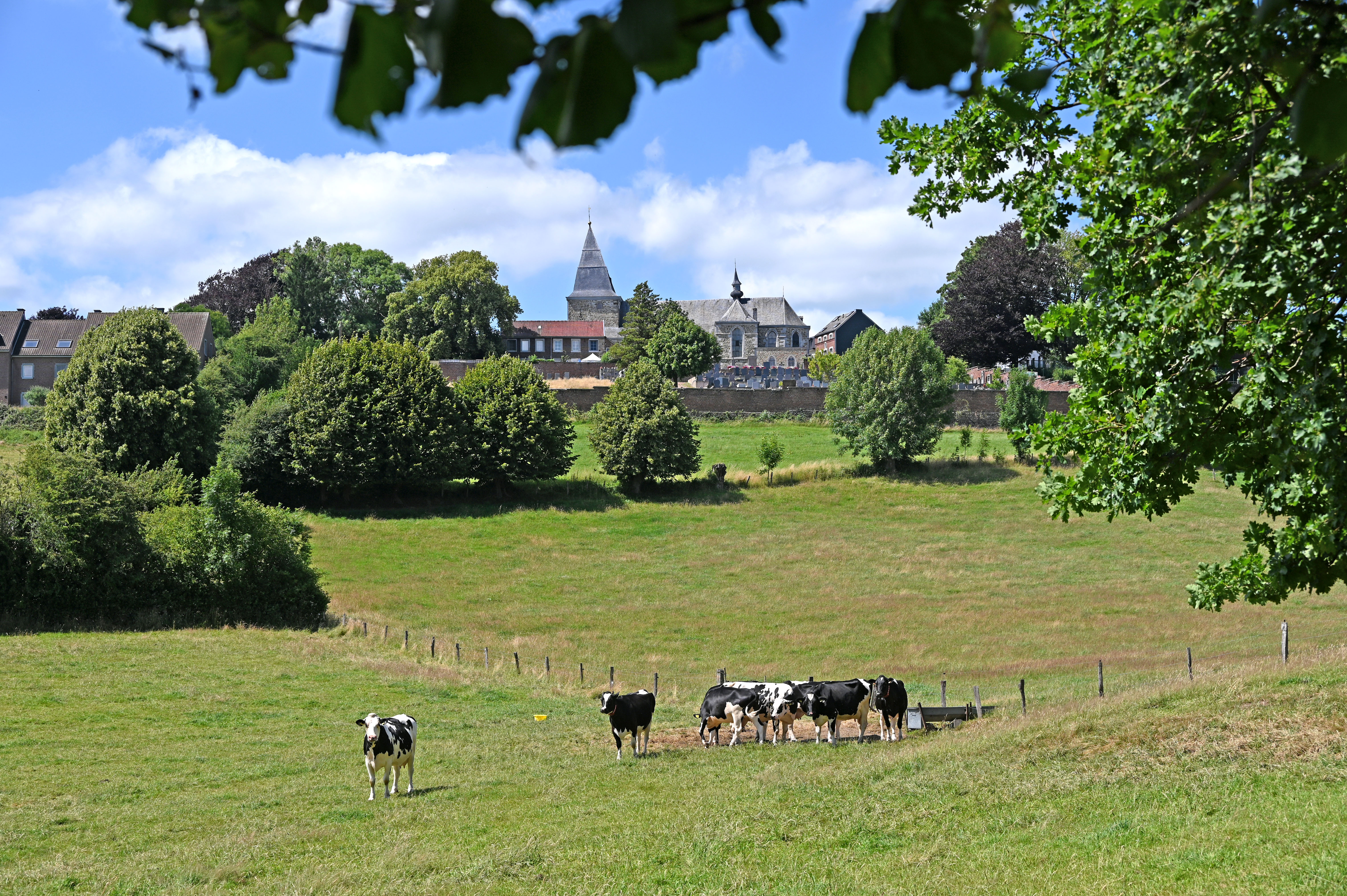
Saint Georges church

Henri-Chapelle (French pronunciation: [ɑ̃ʁi ʃapɛl]; Walloon: Hinri-Tchapele, Dutch: Hendrik-Kapelle, German: Heinrichskapelle, Limburgish: Kapäl) is a village of Wallonia and a district of the municipality of Welkenraedt, located in the province of Liège, Belgium.

It is located 17 kilometers south-west of the spa and border city of Aachen. Just 300 metres (1,000 ft) west of the town, near the water tower, is the highest point in the Herve plateau, at 354 metres (1,161 ft) above sea level.

Henri-Chapelle was its own municipality until January 1, 1977 when it was merged with Welkenraedt as part of the fusion of the Belgian municipalities. Its postal code is 4841.

== War graves ==
4.5 kilometres (2.8 mi) north of the town, at Vogelsang-Hombourg, is the Henri-Chapelle American Cemetery and Memorial, which contains the graves of 7,992 members of the American military who died in World War II.

== Other historic sites and monuments ==
- Saint-Georges church (Gothic architecture with a Roman tower)
- Baelen castle
- Ruyff castle
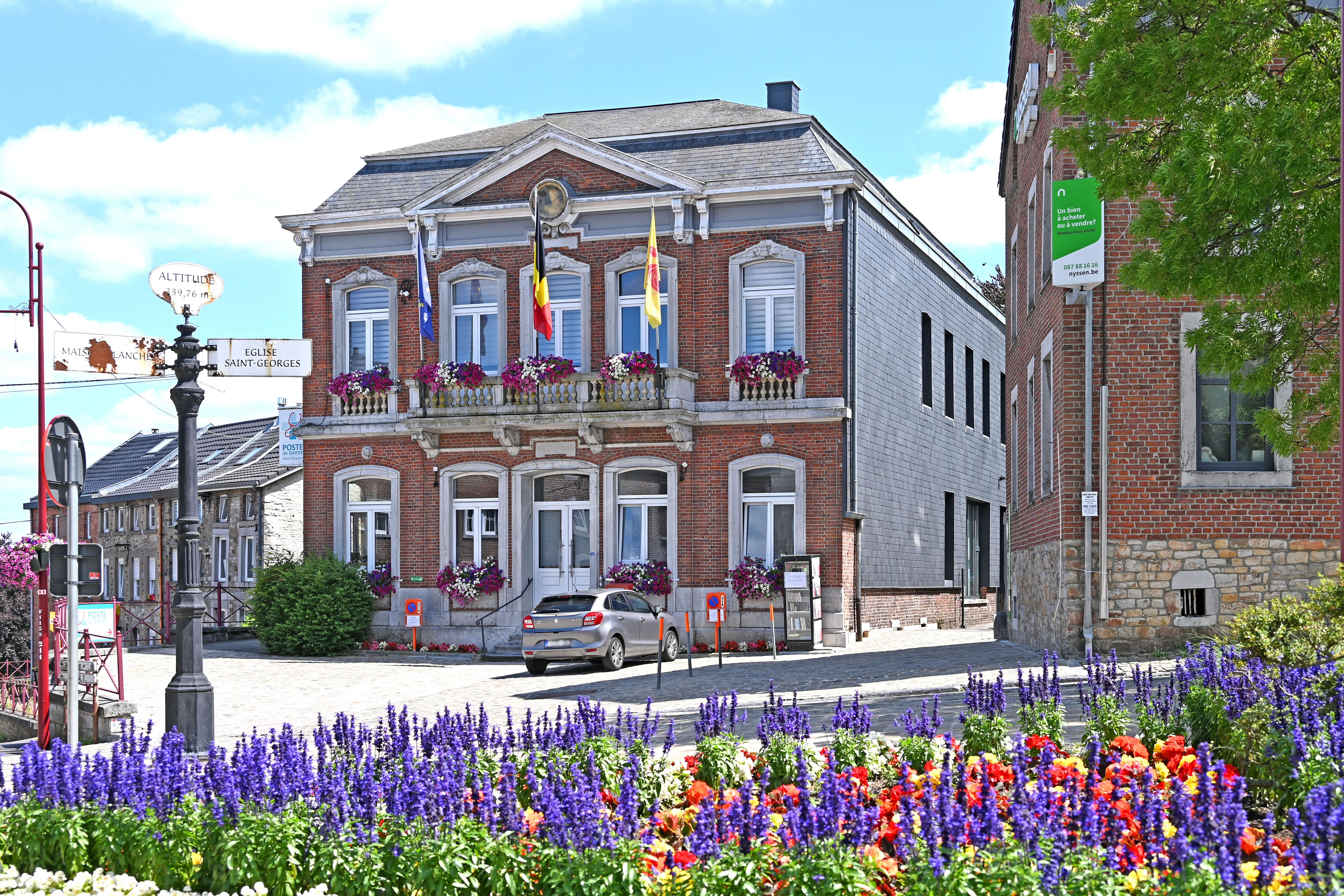
Town hall

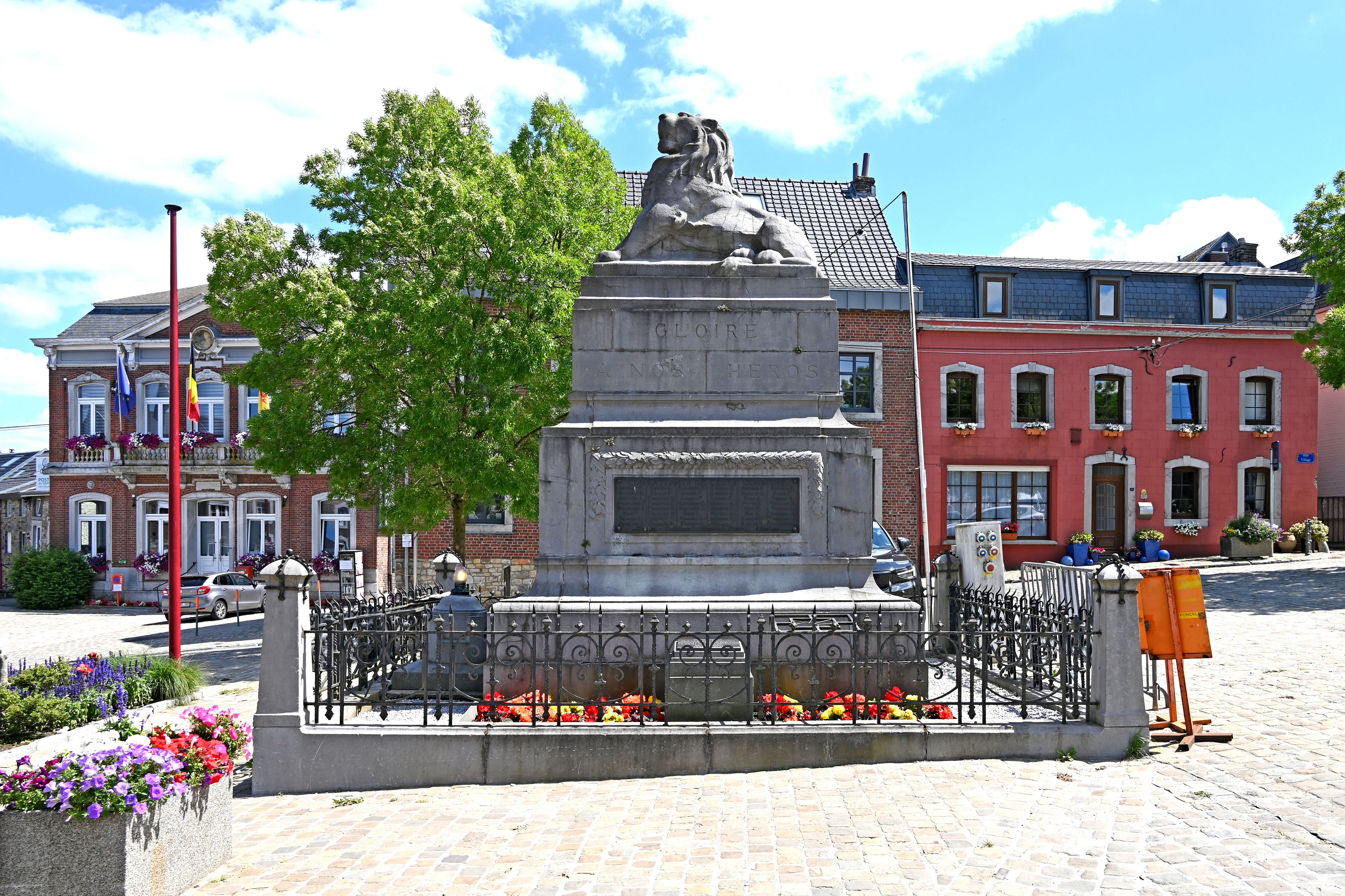
War memorial

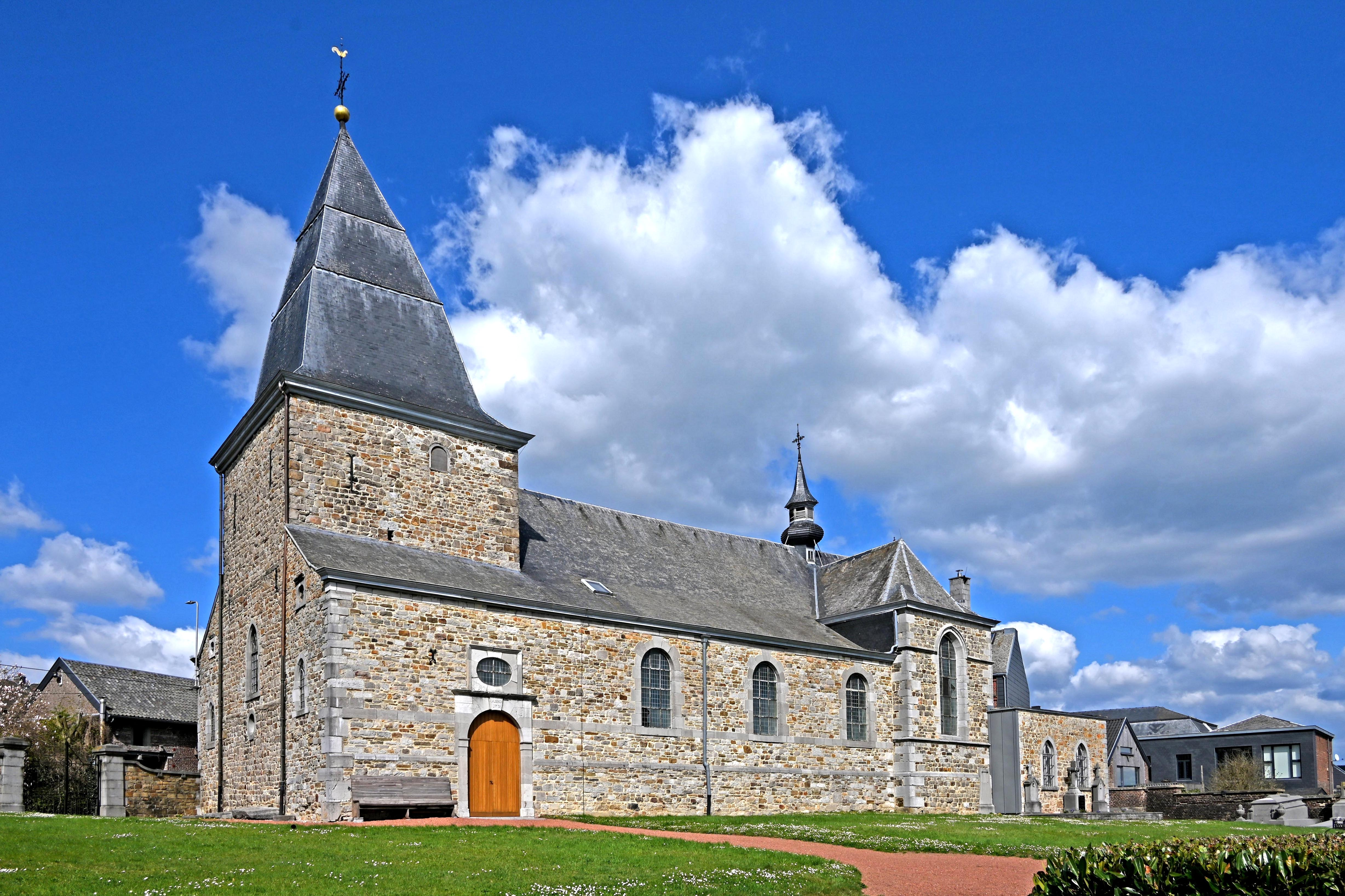
Saint Georges church

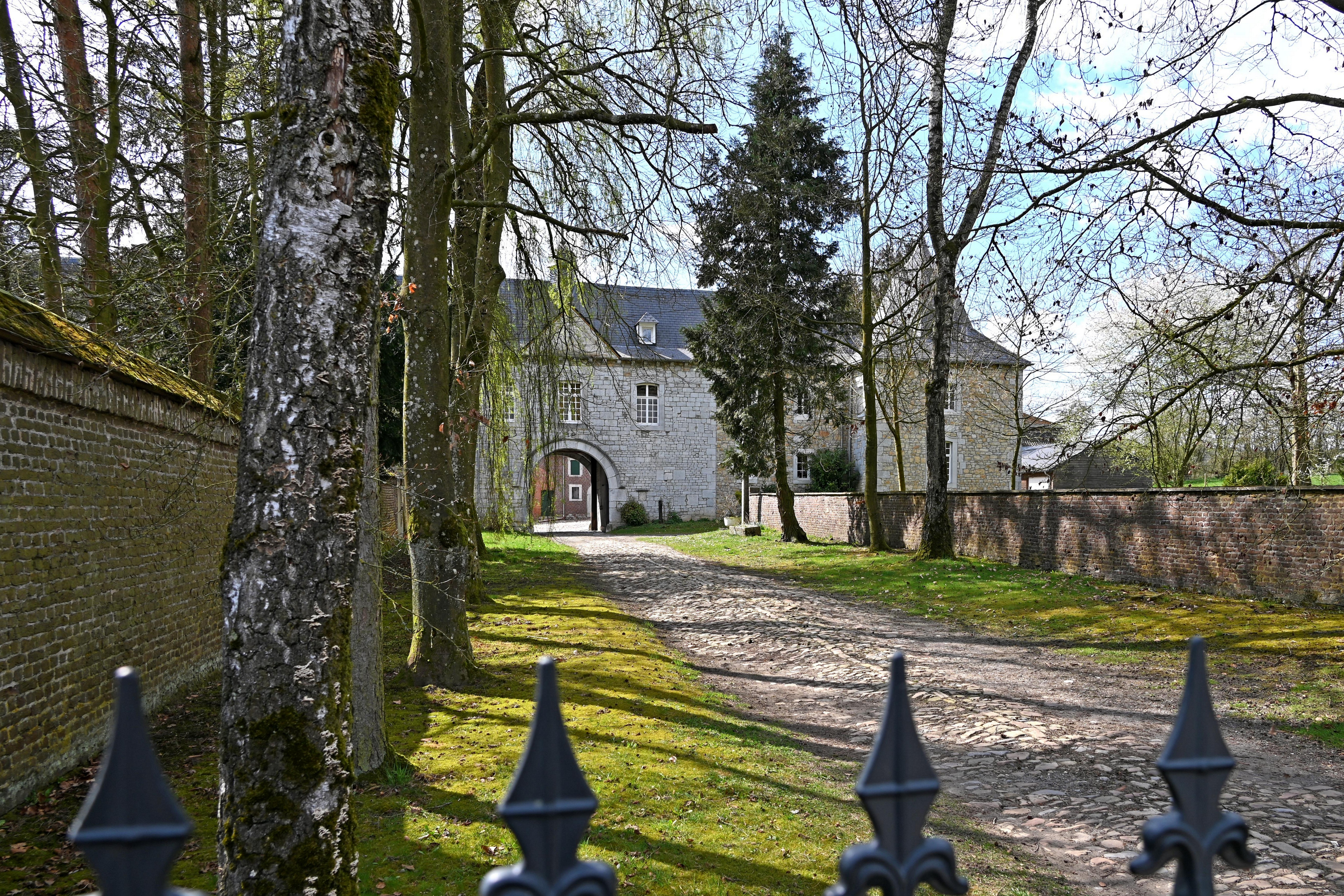
Ruyff castle

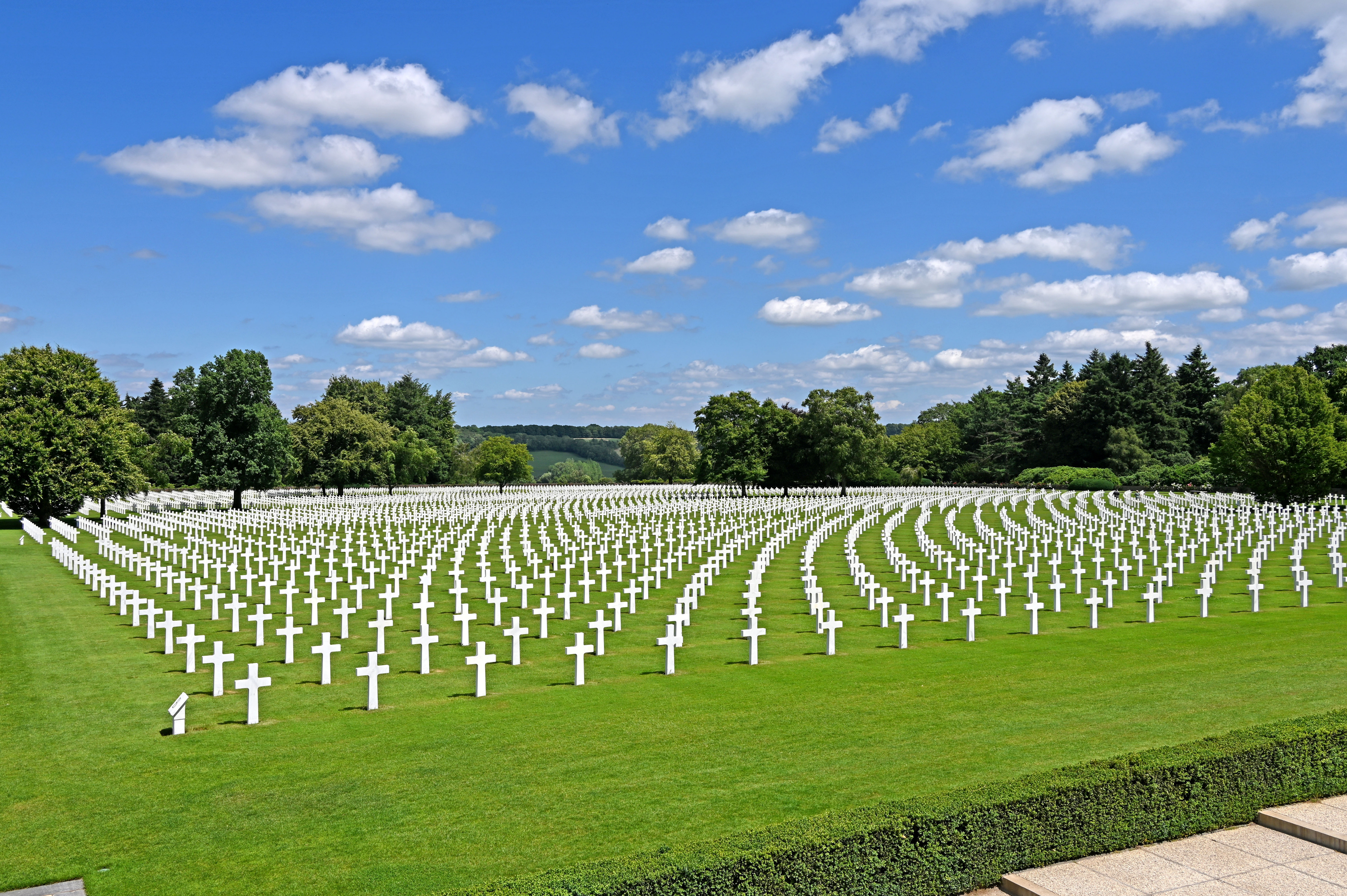
American Cemetery and Memorial

== Nut fair ==
Every autumn for the past 260 years, Henri-Chapelle has hosted a nut fair.
