= David M. Maddox =

American general (1938–2026)

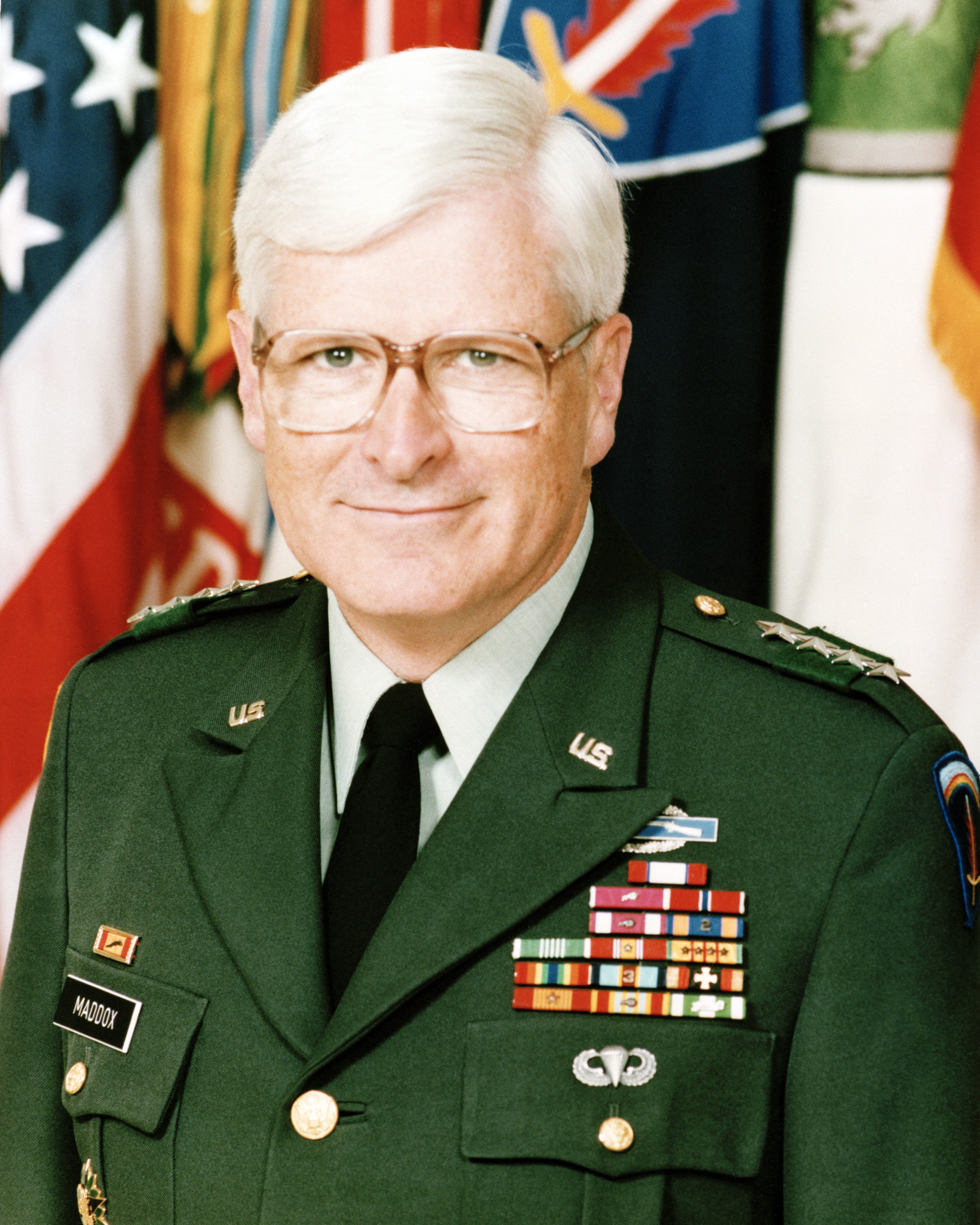
- General David M. Maddox
- Born: 5 April 1938; Chicago, Illinois, U.S.
- Died: 3 January 2026 (aged 87); Bethesda, Maryland, U.S.
- Burial place: Arlington National Cemetery
- Military career
- Allegiance: United States
- Branch: United States Army
- Service years: 1960–1995
- Rank: General
- Nickname: "The Silver Fox"
- Commands: United States Army Europe; V Corps; 8th Infantry Division; 2nd Armored Cavalry Regiment; 1st Squadron, 11th Armored Cavalry Regiment
- Conflicts: Vietnam War
- Awards: Army Distinguished Service Medal; Legion of Merit (6); Bronze Star Medal

David M. Maddox (5 April 1938 – 3 January 2026) was an American general who last served as Commander in Chief, United States Army Europe/Commander, Central Army Group from 1992 to 1993 and Commander in Chief, United States Army Europe from 1993 to 1994. His other commands included the V Corps, the 8th Infantry Division, and the 2nd Armored Cavalry Regiment. He was a 1960 graduate of Virginia Military Institute. He received his Master of Science in Applied Science (Operations Research) from Southern Illinois University in 1969. Maddox served in two combat deployments during the Vietnam War, and as the head of US Army forces in Europe, he maintained their combat capabilities amidst reductions in troop levels at the end of the Cold War.

== Early life and education ==
Maddox was born on 5 April 1938 in Chicago, Illinois. He received a Bachelor of Science degree in mathematics in 1960 from the Virginia Military Institute, where he was also commissioned as a second lieutenant in the United States Army through the Army Reserve Officers' Training Corps. He later obtained a Master of Science degree in operation research analysis with an engineering focus from Southern Illinois University. His military education included the Armor Basic and Advanced Officer Courses, the Armed Forces Staff College, and the Army War College.

== Career ==
After being commissioned as an Armor officer in the United States Army in 1960, he served in the 14th Cavalry Regiment in West Germany. Maddox's later assignments in the Army included two deployments in the Vietnam War, including as senior military advisor with the Military Assistance Command, Vietnam; military assistant to the Deputy Undersecretary of the Army (Operations Research); commander of 1st Squadron, 11th Armored Cavalry Regiment; commander of the 2nd Armored Cavalry Regiment (from 1981 to 1983); Chief of Methodology with the Office of the Deputy Chief of Staff of the Army for Combat Development and the Training and Doctrine Command; and commanding general of the Combined Arms Research Activity at Fort Leavenworth, Kansas. He had also been the assistant division commander (operations and training) of the 4th Infantry Division, and commander of the 8th Infantry Division.

Maddox served as commanding general of V Corps in Germany from November 1990 to June 1992. He then took command of United States Army Europe and NATO's Central Army Group, holding the role until December 1994. Maddox maintained the combat capability of US Army forces in Europe amidst sharp reductions in troop levels at the end of the Cold War.

He spent much of his time towards the end of his career transitioning the Army in Europe to a post-Cold War stance. After retiring from the army, Maddox has worked as an independent consultant to industry and the government. He has also served on the Defense Science Board, was a Senior Fellow of the Army Science Board, and a member of the Washington Institute of Foreign Affairs. He was also elected a member of the National Academy of Engineering in 2004 for contributions to making operations research an integral part of U.S. Army planning and operations at all levels.

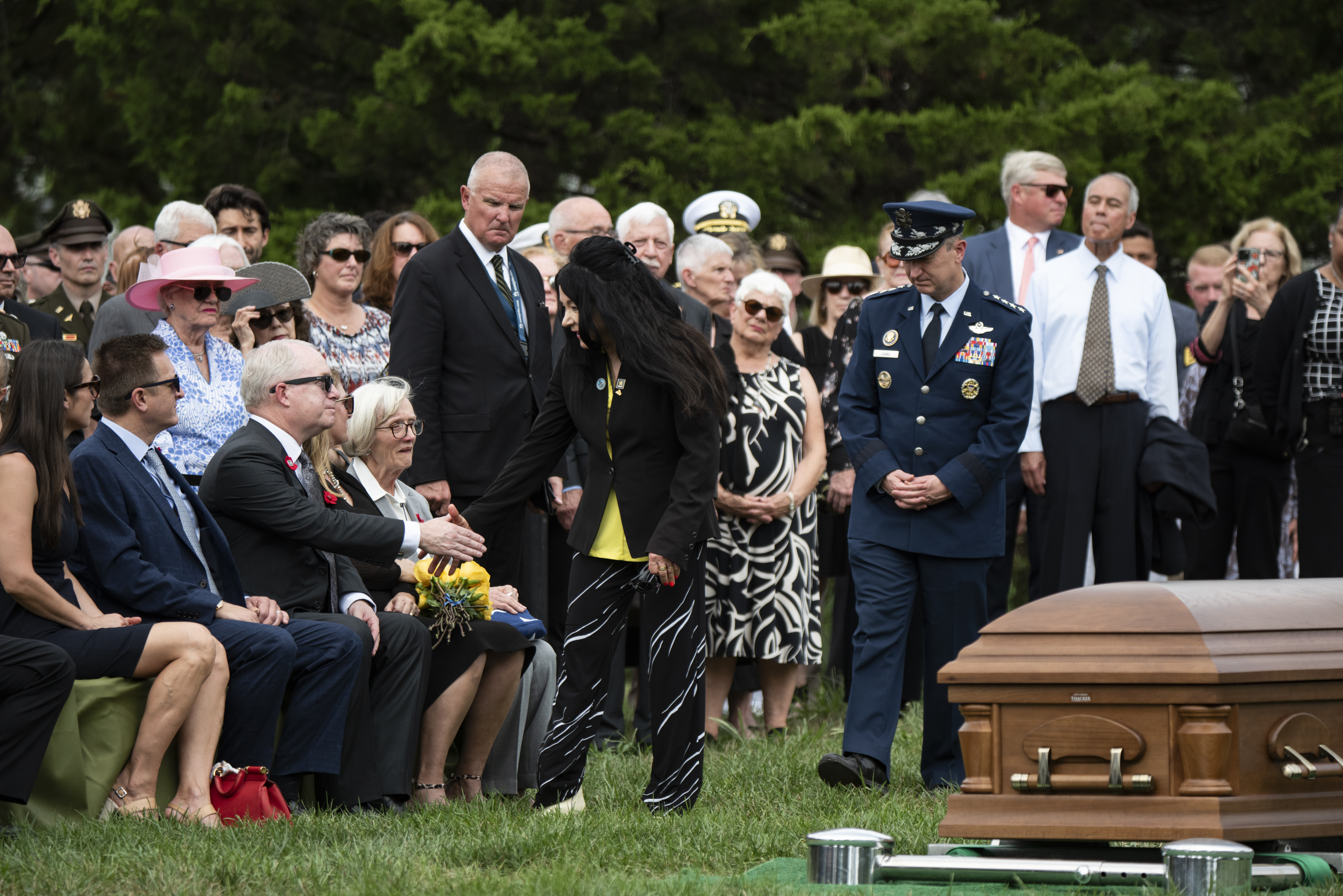
Full Military Funeral Honors with Escort for U.S. Army General David Maddox in Section 34 of Arlington National Cemetery, Virginia on August 18, 2026

In October 2007, Maddox was part of a six-member panel appointed by Secretary of the Army Pete Geren that issued a report critical of the Pentagon's procedures for appointing and supervising contracting officers. He served as a member of the Department of the Army 120-day study, commissioned by Secretary of the Army John McHugh, to examine its acquisition organizations, policies, workforce and processes, including how it acquires and handles equipment.

Maddox received the Military Operations Research Society's Wanner Award for outstanding contributions to the progress of this advanced profession, the Institute for Operations Research and the Management Sciences' J. Steinhardt prize for lifetime contributions to the practical applications of OR techniques for the solution of military problems, and is a member of the Army Operations Research Society Hall of Fame.

== Awards and decorations ==

Combat Infantryman Badge
Army Distinguished Service Medal
Legion of Merit with silver oak leaf cluster	Bronze Star Medal	Meritorious Service Medal with bronze oak leaf cluster
Air Medal with bronze award numeral 2	Army Commendation Medal	National Defense Service Medal with bronze service star
Vietnam Service Medal with four bronze service stars	Army Service Ribbon	Army Overseas Service Ribbon with award numeral 8
Badge of Honour of the Bundeswehr in gold	South Vietnam Gallantry Cross with bronze star	South Vietnam Armed Forces Honor Medal 1st class with bronze oak leaf cluster
South Vietnam Gallantry Cross Unit Citation	South Vietnam Civil Actions Medal Unit Citation	Vietnam Campaign Medal
Basic Parachutist Badge
Army Staff Identification Badge

Other accoutrements
4 Overseas Service Bars

== Personal life ==
He was married to Ethemary G. (McCleskey) Maddox, and they had four children. Maddox was Catholic.

Maddox died at the Walter Reed National Military Medical Center in Bethesda, Maryland, on 3 January 2026, at the age of 87.

Military offices
Preceded by Calvin Waller	Commanding General of the 8th Infantry Division; 1989–1990	Succeeded by John P. Otjen
Preceded by Crosbie E. Saint	Commanding General of United States Army Europe; 1992–1994	Succeeded by William W. Crouch
