= Brittany American Cemetery and Memorial =

ABMC World War II cemetery in Normandy, France

- American Battle Monuments Commission
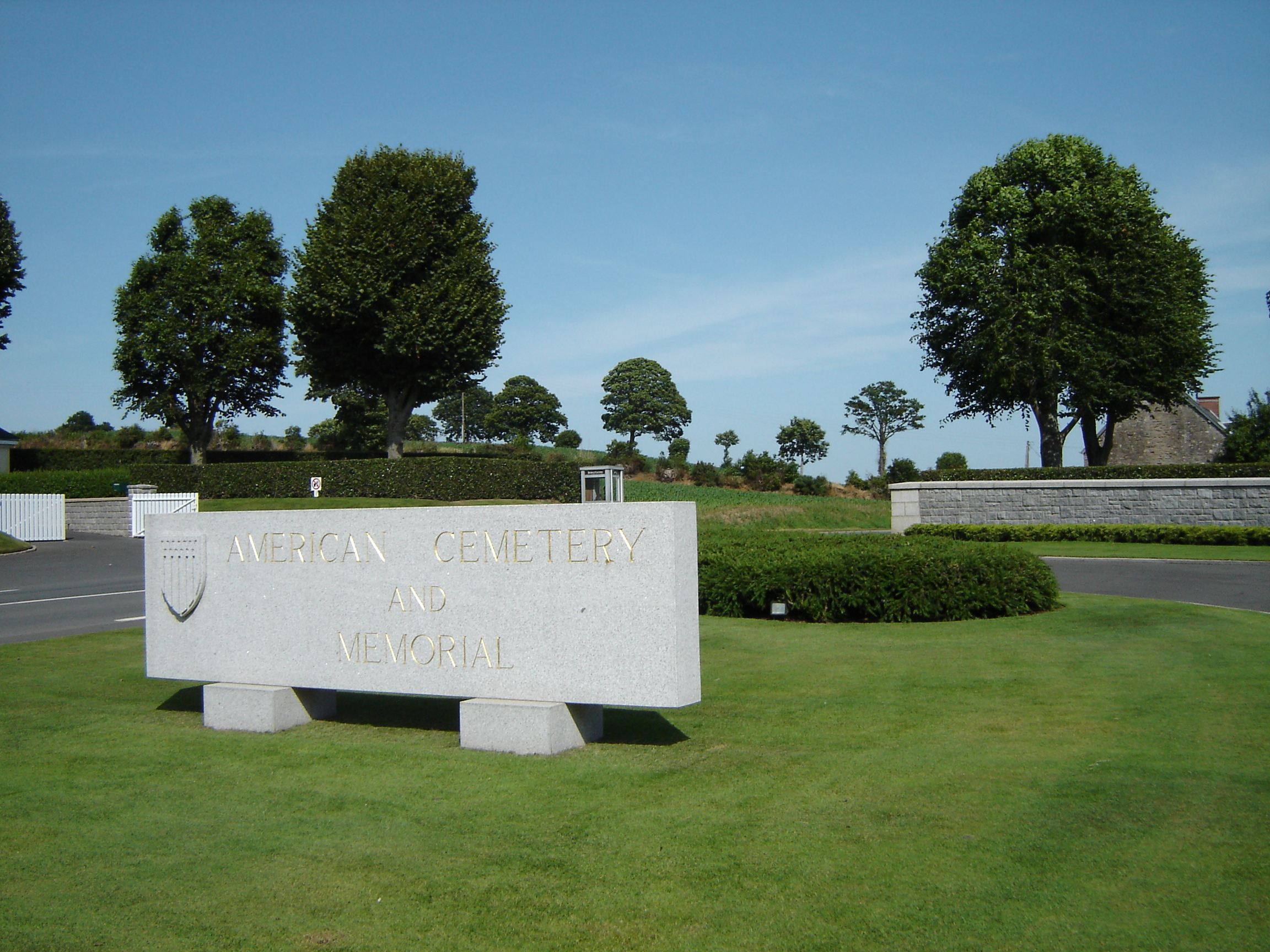
- For Operation Overlord
- Established: 4 August 1944
- Location: 48°31′08″N 01°18′15″W near Saint-James, France
- Designed by: William T. Aldrich
- Total burials: 4,410
- Unknowns: 498

Burials by nation
- * United States: 4,410

Burials by war
- * World War II: 4,410

The Brittany American Cemetery and Memorial is located in Saint-James, Normandy, France, near the northeastern edge of Brittany. It contains the remains of 4,410 of World War II American soldiers, most of whom died in the Normandy and Brittany campaigns of 1944. Along the retaining wall of the memorial terrace are inscribed the names of 498 of the missing. Rosettes mark the names of soldiers whose remains have been identified.

== History ==
The Brittany American Cemetery, 28 acres (11 ha) in extent, lies among the hedgerows in rolling farm country in Normandy near the border with Brittany in France. It is one of fourteen permanent American World War II military cemetery memorials erected by the American Battle Monuments Commission on foreign soil.

The site was liberated on 2 August 1944 by the 8th Infantry Division; a temporary military cemetery was established on it three days later. After the war, when the temporary cemeteries were being disestablished by the American Graves Registration Service, the remains of American military dead whose next of kin had requested interment on foreign soil were moved from the temporary cemeteries to one of the permanent cemetery sites, usually the one closest to the temporary location.

The 4,410 American military dead buried in the Brittany American Cemetery died in the area of northwestern France extending from the beachhead westward to Brest and eastward to the Seine and represent 43 percent of the burials originally made in the region. They were interred there by the American Graves Registration Service in the distinctive grave patterns proposed by the cemetery's architect and approved by this Commission. Most of them died in the fighting in and around Saint-Lô.

The design and construction of all cemetery facilities in the permanent World War I and II cemeteries, were the responsibility of the American Battle Monuments Commission (i.e., the memorial, chapel, visitors' building, superintendent's quarters, service facilities and paths, roads and walls). The Commission was also responsible for the sculpture, landscaping and other improvements. Construction of the permanent cemetery memorial at Brittany was completed in 1956.

== Memorial Chapel ==
The Memorial Chapel consists of an antechamber and tower, museum room and chancel. Typical of the ecclesiastical architecture of the region, it is Romanesque in design.

The exterior of the memorial is constructed of local La Pyrie granite. At its east end is a sculpture group. "Youth Triumphing Over Evil" designed by Lee Lawrie of Easton, Maryland and executed in Chauvigny limestone from the Poitiers region by Jean Juge of Paris.

Carved in its granite base is the inscription:

I HAVE FOUGHT A GOOD FIGHT
I HAVE FINISHED MY COURSE
I HAVE KEPT THE FAITH

— 2 Timothy IV, 7

Over the entrance door is a sculpture group, also designed by Lee Lawrie and executed by Jean Juge, consisting of an eagle, shield, stars, laurel and arrows representing the Great Seal of the United States; the shield is flanked by two floating angels representing victory. The one to the left of the observer, wearing the Columbian cap, is in mourning. She holds in her right hand the laurel of the brave, and in her left hand the palm of sacrifice. The figure to the right is a triumphant Victory, clothed in mail and wearing a helmet. Her right hand holds a sword, her left hand a trumpet.

Below the sculpture over the tympanum is the inscription:

IN MEMORY OF THE VALOR AND THE SACRIFICES WHICH CONSECRATE THIS SOIL

== Burial area ==
There are 4,410 American military personnel buried in the cemetery. Their 4,408 headstones are set in 16 fan-shaped plots, curving from the central mall. The dead came from every state in the Union, the District of Columbia and Canada. Ninety-five of the headstones mark graves of "unknowns;" two of these graves contain the remains of two Unknowns that could not be separated. In twenty instances, two brothers are buried side by side.

At the far (east) end of the mall is a rectangular stone cenotaph of LaPyrie granite designed by Lee Lawrie and executed by the French sculptor, Augustine Beggi. Carved upon it are a torch and laurel wreath in bas-relief and the words:

PROPATRIA 1941–1945

== Notable burials ==
- Lieutenant Thomas R. Potts (1915–1944 †), infantryman who had an acting career under the stage name Richard Fiske
- Sergeant Sherwood H. Hallman (1913–1944 †), Medal of Honor recipient
- Private Ernest W. Prussman (1921–1944 †), Medal of Honor recipient

== Additional images ==
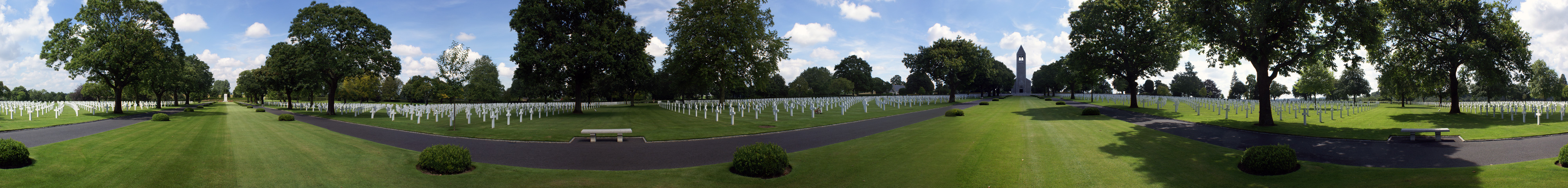
A panorama of Brittany American Cemetery and Memorial
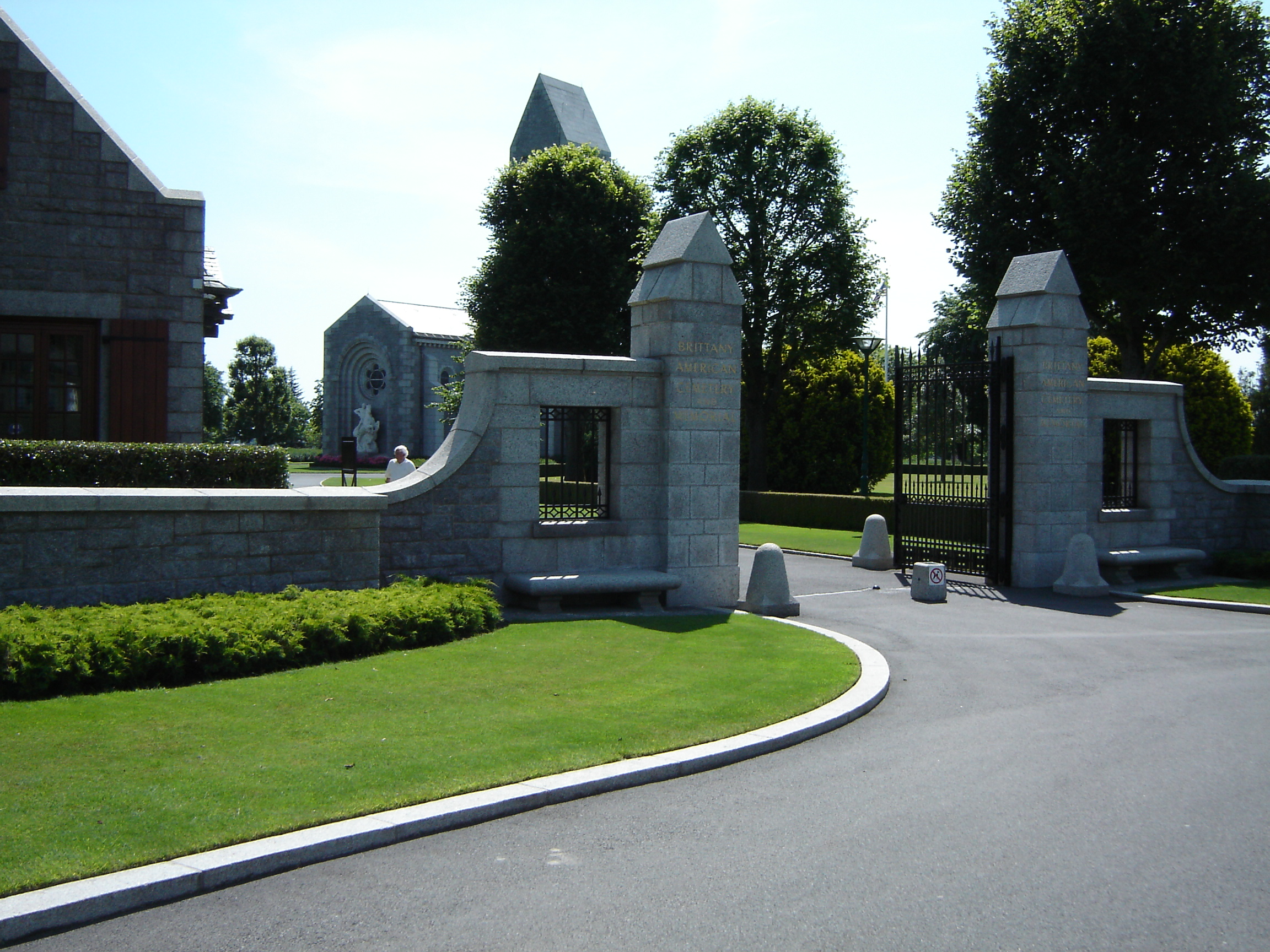
Cemetery entrance from outside

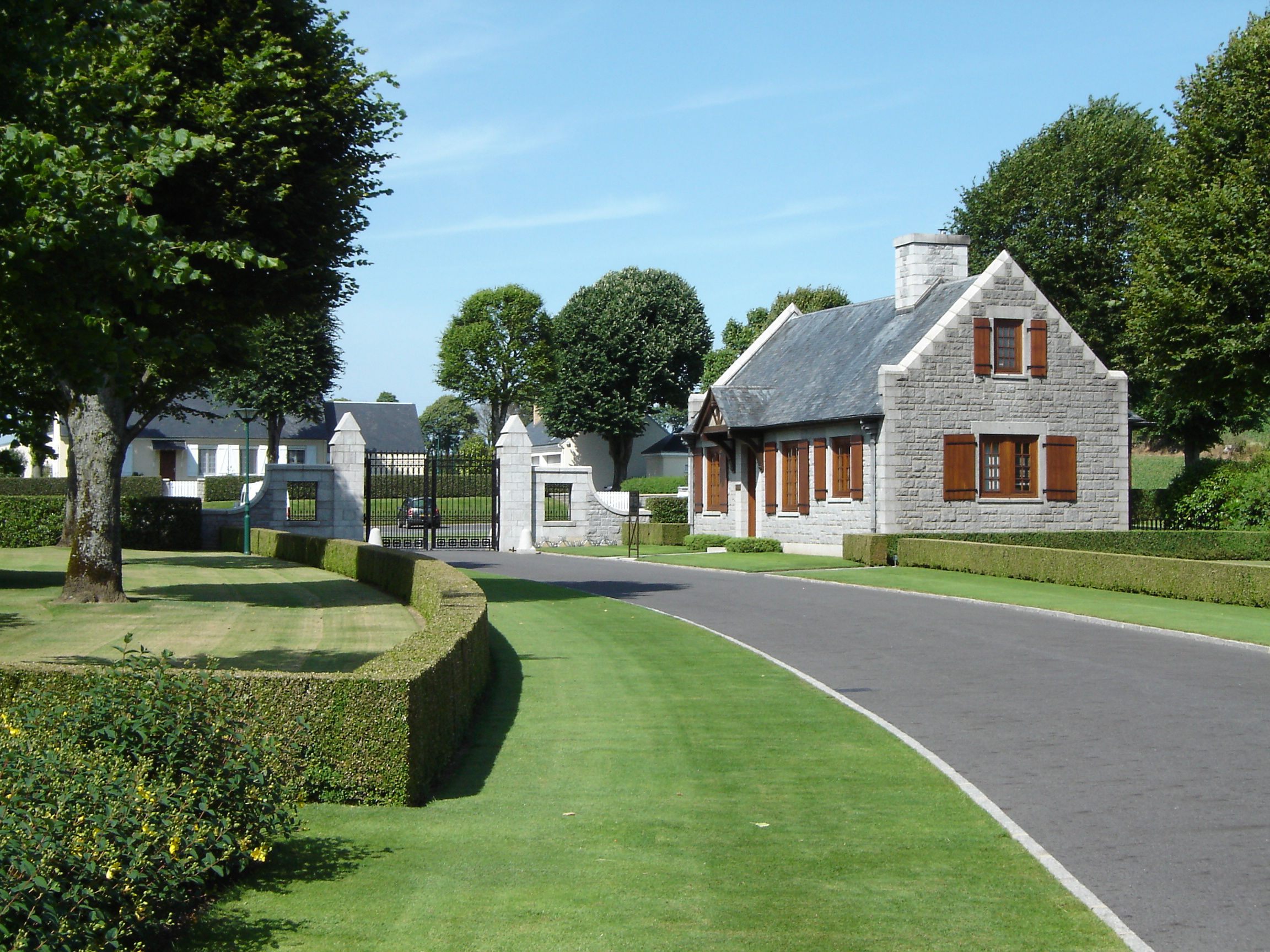
Cemetery entrance from inside

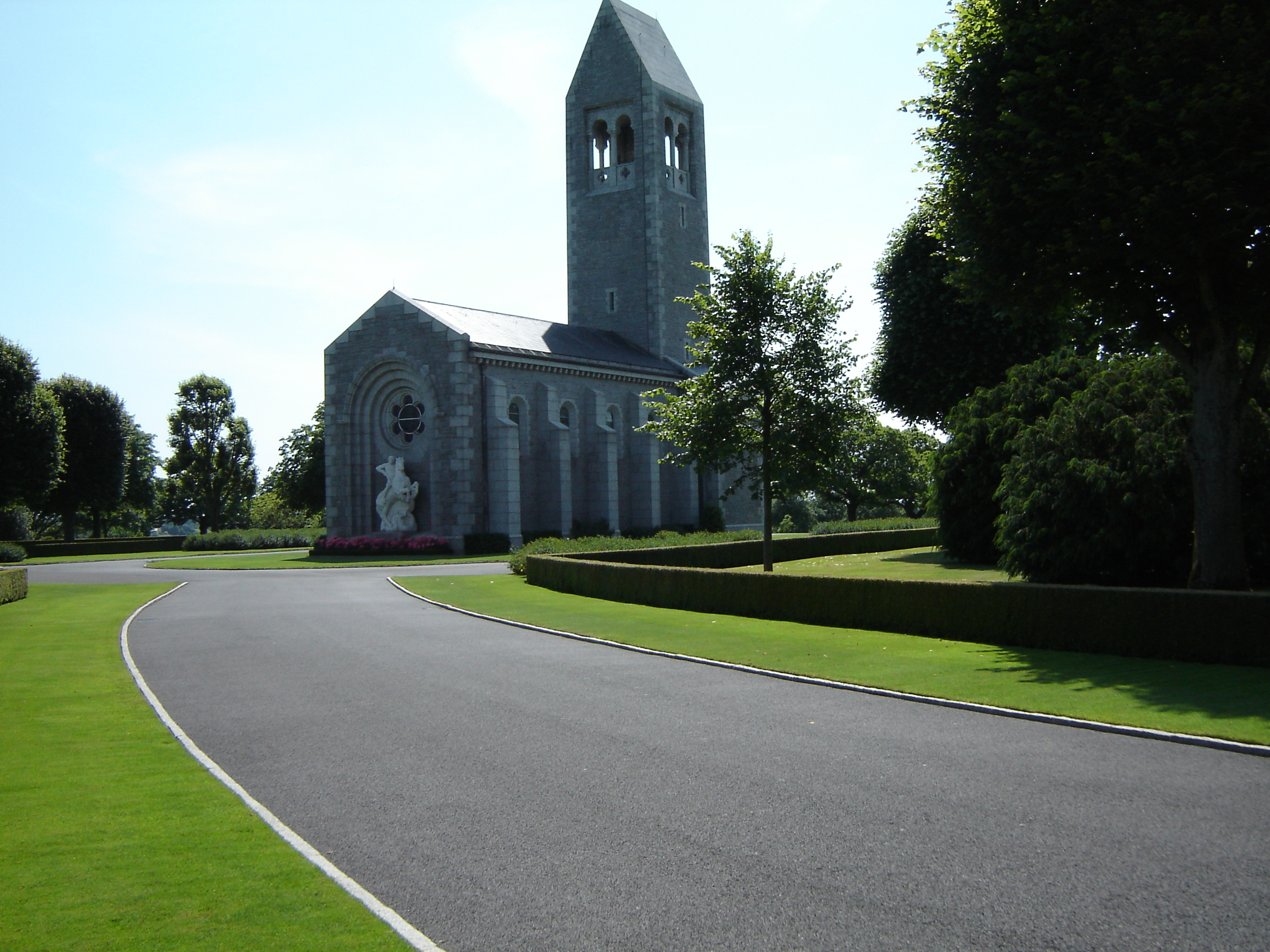
Cemetery Chapel

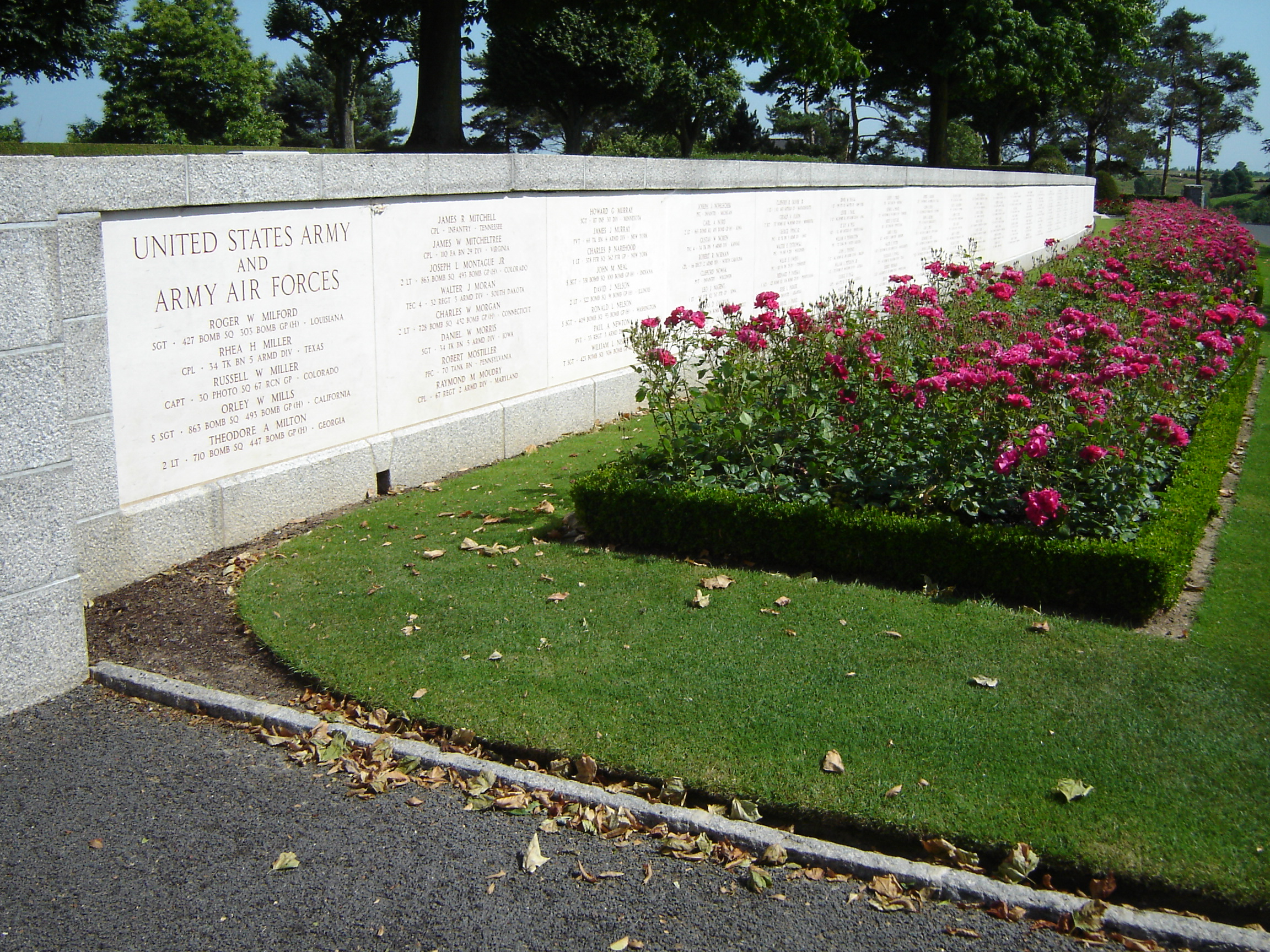
Retaining wall with the inscribed
names of the missing.

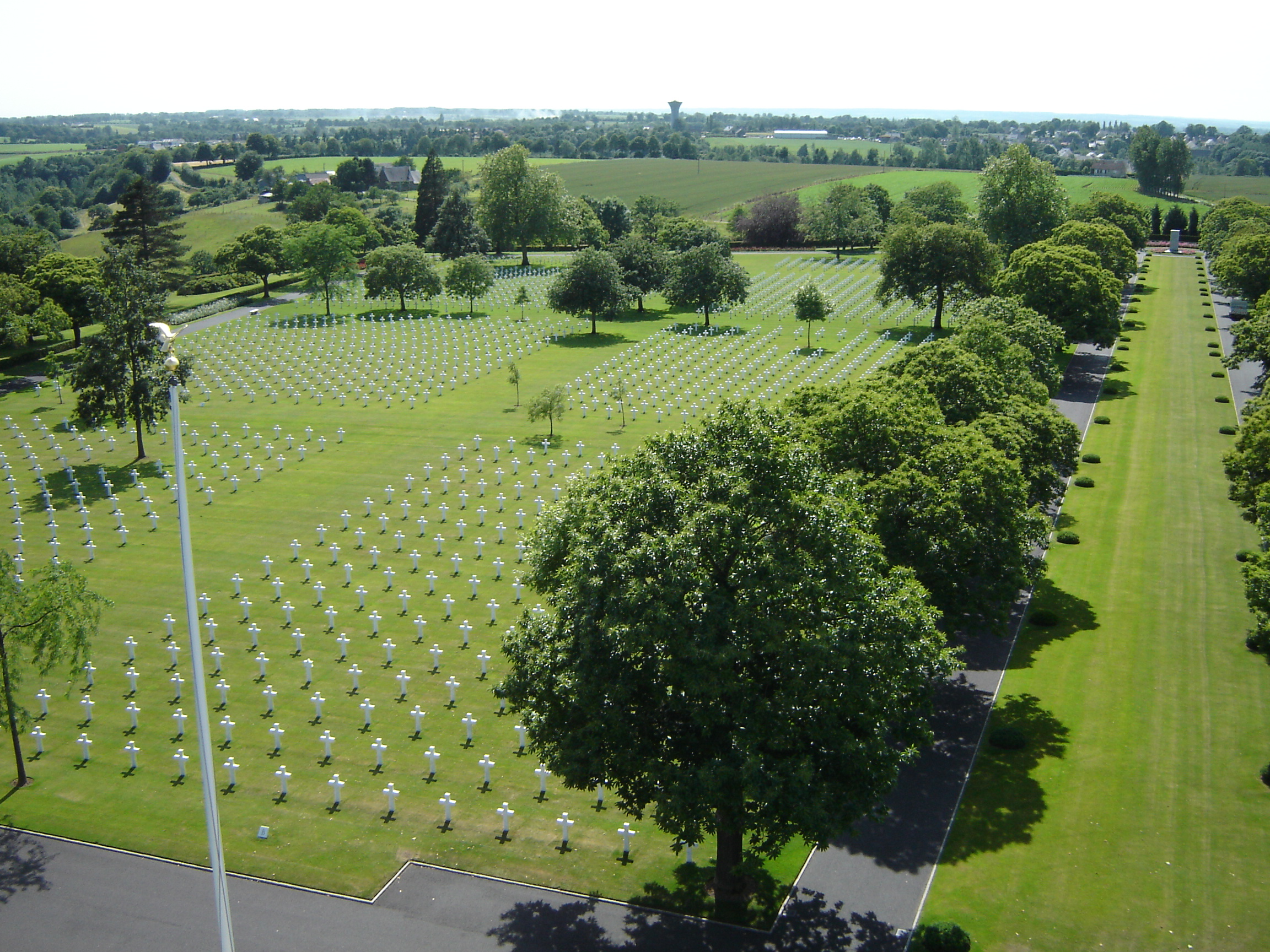
Burial Area from top of Chapel

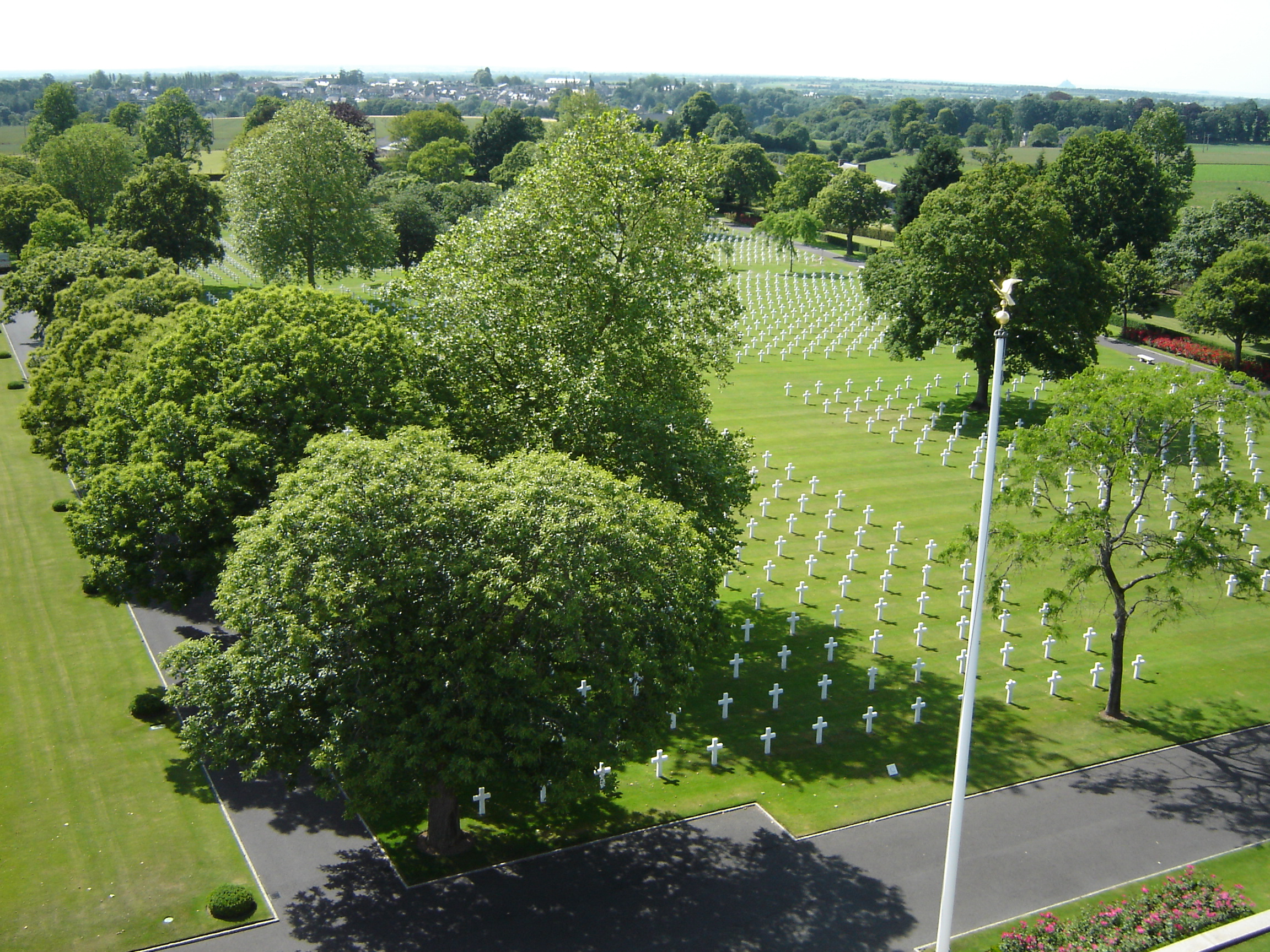
Burial Area from top of Chapel
