= 43rd Field Artillery Battalion (United States) =

- Active: 1933
- Country: United States
- Branch: Army
- Type: Field artillery
- Motto(s): "Quo Fata Vocant" (Wither the fates call)

The 43rd Field Artillery Battalion was a field artillery battalion of the Regular Army

== Lineage ==
Constituted 1 October 1933 in the Regular Army as the 43rd Field Artillery

Redesignated 13 January 1941 as the 43rd Field Artillery Battalion.

Assigned to the 8th Infantry Division (United States) and activated at Fort Jackson, South Carolina 1 June 1941

Inactivated 20 October 1945 at Fort Leonard Wood, Missouri.

(1st Battalion, 43rd Coast Artillery reconstituted and consolidated with the 43rd Field Artillery Battalion 28 June 1950)

Activated 17 August 1950 at Fort Jackson, South Carolina

Relieved from the 8th Infantry Division and inactivated in Germany 1 August 1957

Consolidated with 43rd Artillery 1 March 1959.

== Campaign streamers ==
World War I

World War II

- Normandy
- Northern France
- Rhineland
- Central Europe

== Decorations ==
- Luxembourg Croix de Guerre, Streamer embroidered LUXEMBOURG

== Current units ==
not active

== Coat of arms ==
- Shield

Gules, a 105mm shell or surmounted by a compass rose argent and sable

- Crest

none

- Background

in the predominating scarlet and gold of the field artillery arm the functions of the organization are symbolized by the 105mm shell. The compass represents the far reaching effect of the fire of the organization and represents willingness to carry on to all points of the compass.

== See also ==
- Field Artillery Branch (United States)
- U.S. Army Regimental System
- List of field artillery regiments of the United States
