= Thomas Leonard Harrold =

United States Army general (1902–1973)

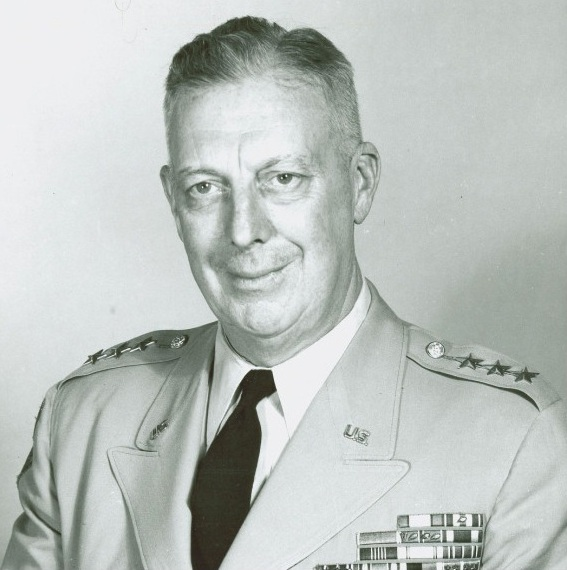
- Harrold as Commandant of the National War College
- Born: 21 June 1902; San Diego, California, US
- Died: 16 June 1973 (aged 70); Fort Lauderdale, Florida, US
- Burial place: Arlington National Cemetery
- Military career
- Allegiance: United States
- Branch: United States Army
- Service years: 1925–1961
- Rank: Lieutenant General
- Commands: National War College; United States Army Caribbean Command; III Corps; 8th Infantry Division; 10th Mountain Division; 1st Cavalry Division; United States Army Armor School; 3rd Constabulary Brigade
- Conflicts: World War II; Korean War
- Awards: Army Distinguished Service Medal (2); Silver Star (2); Legion of Merit; Bronze Star Medal (3)

Thomas Leonard Harrold (21 June 1902 – 16 June 1973) was a United States Army lieutenant general. He was commander of the 9th Armored Division, United States Army Armor School, 1st Cavalry Division, 8th Infantry Division, 10th Mountain Division, III Corps, and United States Army Caribbean. From 1958 to 1961 he served as commandant of the National War College.

== Early life ==
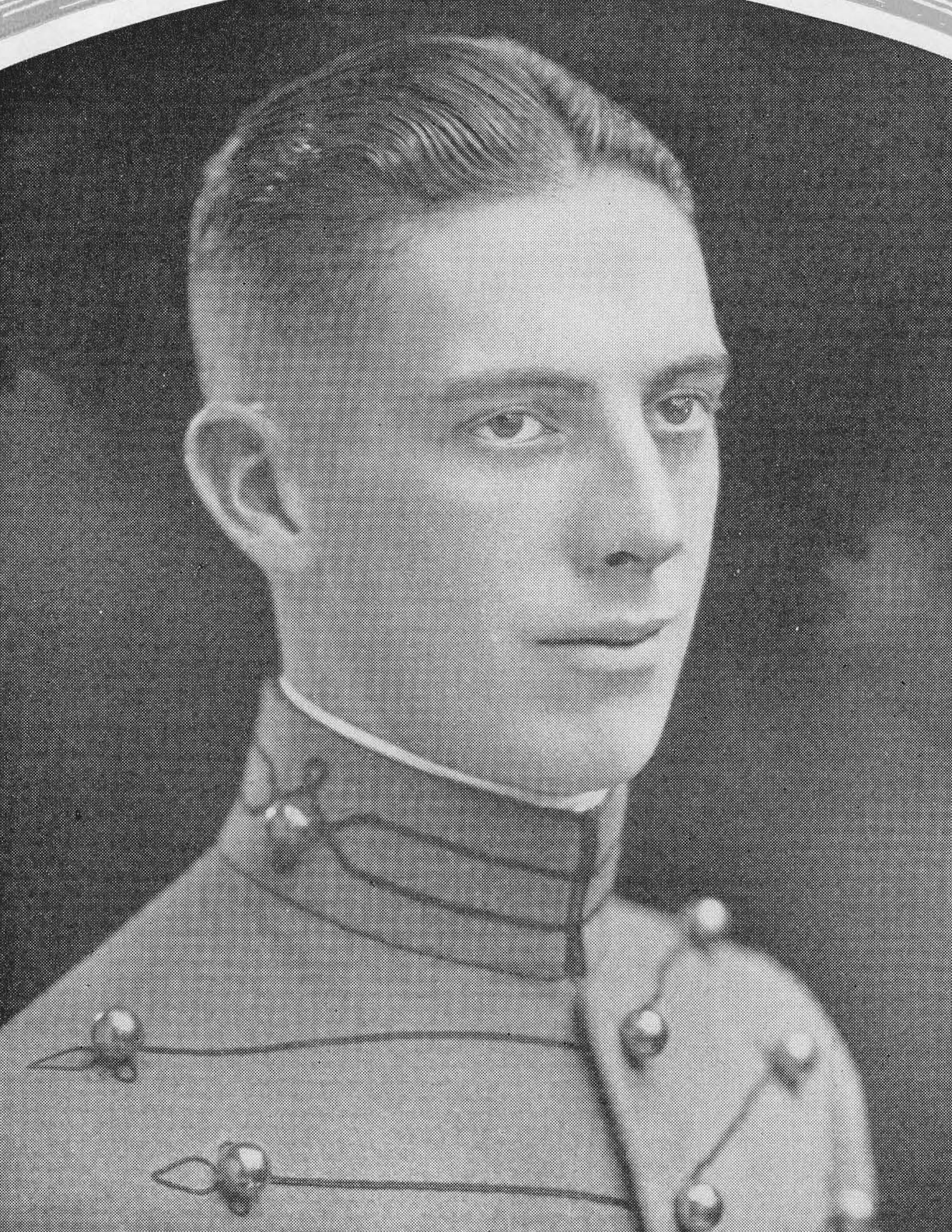
At West Point in 1925

Harrold was born in San Diego, California on 21 June 1902. He graduated from the United States Military Academy at West Point in 1925 and was commissioned as a second lieutenant of Cavalry.

== Early career ==
From 1926 to 1927, Harrold was the adjutant for the 7th Cavalry Regiment. He graduated from the Cavalry Officers Course in 1930. Harrold served as an instructor at West Point in the early 1930s. In the early 1940s, Harrold was in charge of army recruiting for the area that included Connecticut. In 1942, Harrold graduated from the Command and the General Staff College.

During World War II, Harrold commanded Combat Command A, 9th Armored Division, serving from 27 August 1944 to 3 May 1945. Harrold led his command during combat in Europe, including a key role in repelling the Germans during the Battle of the Bulge.

Harrold commanded the 9th Armored Division from 1945 to 1946.

== Senior command ==
From 1946 to 1947, Harrold served as commander of the 3rd Constabulary Brigade in West Germany. Harrold served as Director of Civil Affairs for the United States Army European Command from 1947 to 1949. From 1949 to 1951, Harrold served as commander of the United States Army Armor School and Fort Knox.

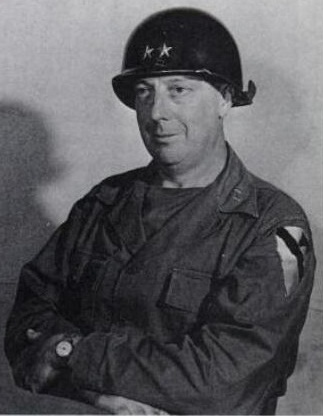
Harrold as commander of the 1st Cavalry Division

Harrold briefly served as deputy commander of I Corps in 1951, but was soon transferred to commander of the 1st Cavalry Division. He served from July 1951 to March 1952, receiving promotion to major general and leading the division during the Korean War. Harrold commanded the division during its stationing at Hokkaido, the northernmost island in Japan, where it carried out combat training, electronic surveillance and defense of Japan from potential attacks by the Soviet Union or China.

From February 1953 to June 1954, Harrold was commander of the 10th Mountain Division. Harrold commanded the 8th Infantry Division from August to November 1954. General Harrold served as commander of the III Corps at Fort Hood from 1954 to 1956. From 1956 to 1958, Harrold served as commander of the United States Army Caribbean Command. Harrold was Commandant of the National War College from 1958 until his 1961 retirement.

== Awards and decorations ==
Harrold's decorations included the Army Distinguished Service Medal (two awards), Silver Star (two awards), Legion of Merit, and Bronze Star Medal (three awards).

== Retirement and death ==
In retirement, Harrold resided at Fort Lauderdale, Florida, where he died on 16 June 1973. He was buried at Arlington National Cemetery, Section 2 Site E-508.

== Personal life ==
Harrold was married to Emily Draper of Troy, New York. They had one child, Sally, who was born in 1937.
