= 8th Infantry Division (United States) =

Former US Army unit

- 8th Infantry Division shoulder sleeve insignia
- Active: 17 December 1917–5 September 1919; 24 March 1923–20 November 1945; 17 August 1950–17 January 1992
- Country: United States
- Branch: United States Army
- Type: Infantry
- Size: Division
- Nicknames: Golden Arrow Division; Pathfinder
- Motto: These Are My Credentials
- Engagements: World War I; AEF in Siberia; World War II; Normandy; Northern France; Rhineland; Central Europe

Commanders
- Notable commanders: Thomas L. Harrold; Andrew Goodpaster; Carl E. Vuono; William S. Graves

Insignia
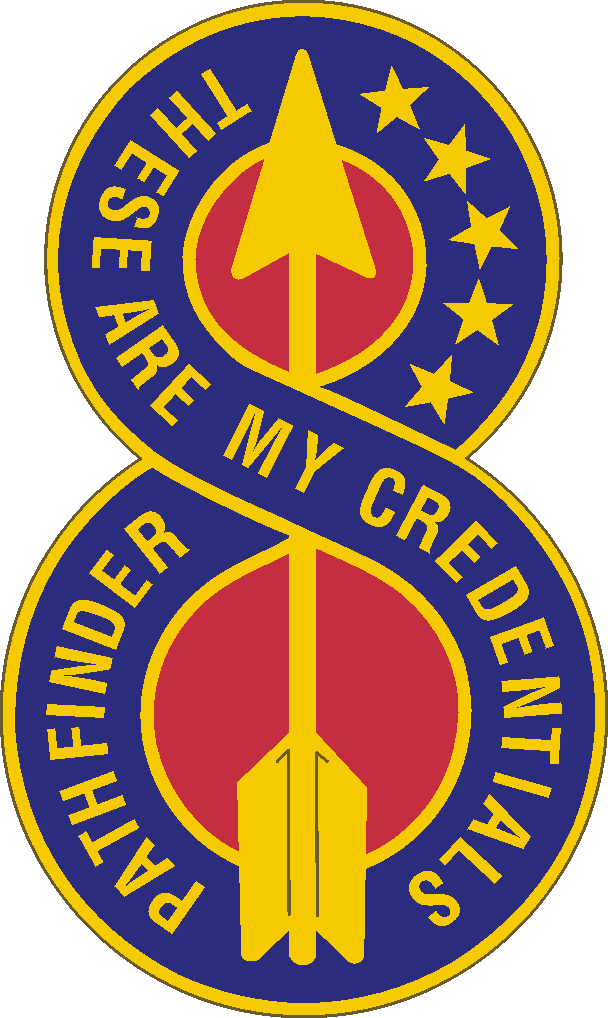
- Distinctive Unit Insignia

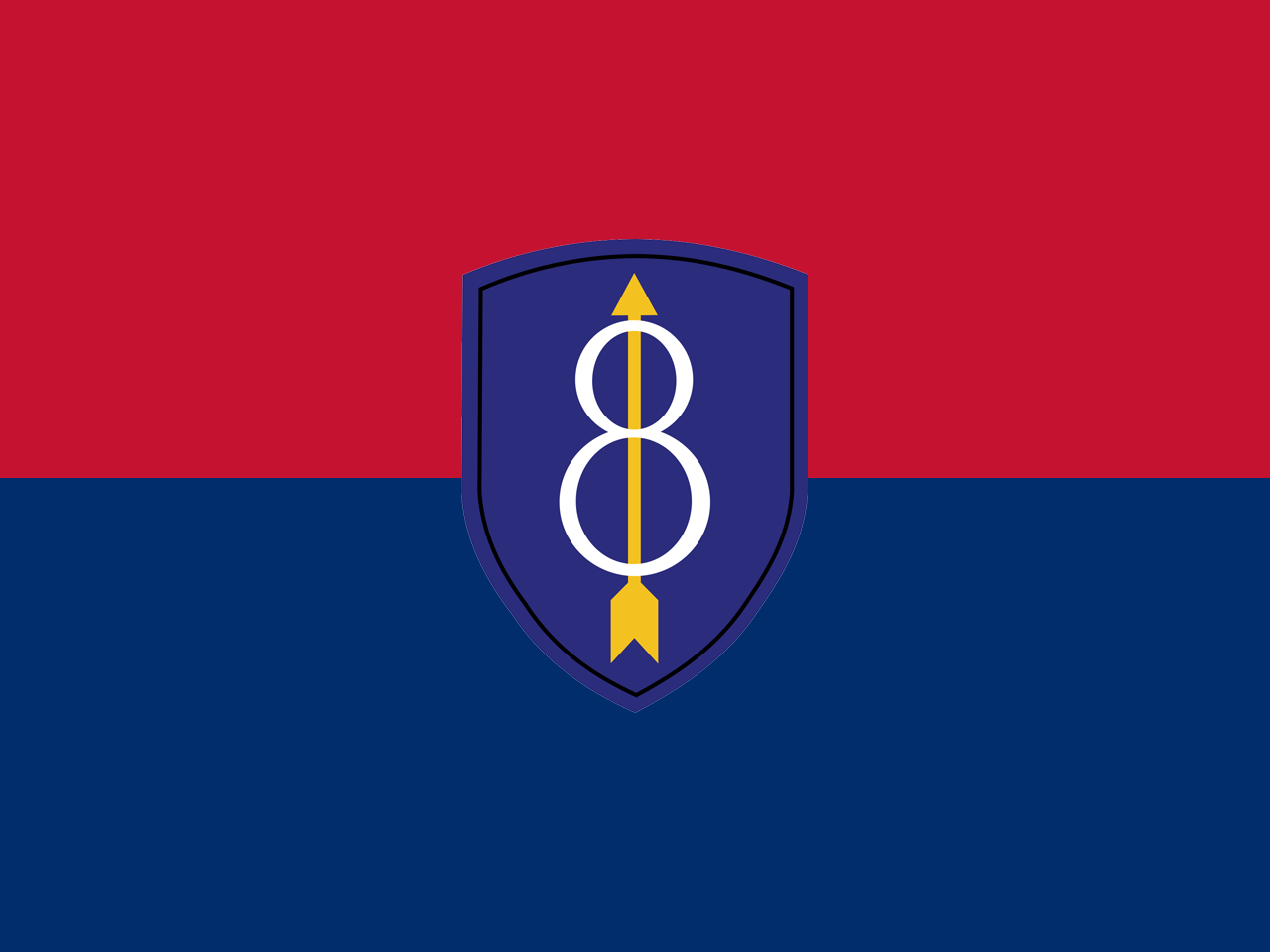
- Flag of the United States Army 8th Infantry Division

The 8th Infantry Division, ("Pathfinder") was an infantry division of the United States Army during the 20th century. The division served in World War I, World War II, and Operation Desert Storm. Initially activated in January 1918, the unit did not see combat during World War I and returned to the United States. Some units served in the American Expeditionary Force to Siberia. It was activated again on 1 July 1940 as part of the build-up of military forces before the US entered World War II. It then took part in the Normandy landings and fought in France and Germany. Following World War II, the division was moved to West Germany, where it remained stationed at the Rose Barracks in Bad Kreuznach until it was deactivated on 17 January 1992.

== History ==
=== World War I ===
- Activated: January 1918
- Overseas: November 1918
- Commanders:
  - Col. Elmore F. Taggart (5 January – 14 February 1918)
  - Col. G. L. Van Deusen (15 – 24 February 1918)
  - Brig. Gen. Joseph D. Leitch (25 February – 9 March 1918; 18 March – 17 July 1918; 4 – 10 August 1918; 12 August – 1 September 1918)
  - Maj. Gen. John Frank Morrison (10 – 17 March 1918)
  - Maj. Gen. William S. Graves (18 July – 3 August 1918; 11 August 1918)
  - Maj. Gen. Eli A. Helmick (2 September 1918 – 19 November 1918; 26 November 1918)
  - Brig. Gen. John J. Bradley (20 – 26 November 1918)

==== Order of battle ====
On 17 December 1917, the War Department directed the organization of the 8th Division at Camp Fremont, California, from Regular Army units.

- Headquarters, 8th Division
- 15th Infantry Brigade
  - 12th Infantry Regiment
  - 62nd Infantry Regiment (formed with a cadre from the 12th Infantry)
  - 23rd Machine Gun Battalion
- 16th Infantry Brigade
  - 8th Infantry Regiment
  - 13th Infantry Regiment
  - 24th Machine Gun Battalion
- 8th Field Artillery Brigade
  - 2nd Field Artillery Regiment (155 mm)
  - 81st Field Artillery Regiment (75 mm) (formed from the 23rd Cavalry)
  - 83rd Field Artillery Regiment (75 mm) (formed from the 25th Cavalry)
  - 8th Trench Mortar Battery
- 22nd Machine Gun Battalion
- 319th Engineer Regiment (formed with a cadre from the 3rd Engineers)
- 320th Field Signal Battalion
- Headquarters Troop, 8th Division
- 8th Train Headquarters and Military Police
  - 8th Ammunition Train
  - 8th Supply Train
  - 8th Engineer Train
  - 8th Sanitary Train
    - 11th, 31st, 32nd, and 43rd Ambulance Companies and Field Hospitals

==== Russia ====
In August 1918, Major General Graves, along with his staff, 5,000 men, and 100 officers, was transferred to Siberia to occupy Vladivostok in Russia as part of the intervention in the Russian Civil War. Major General Eli A. Helmick succeeded Graves in command of the division. The overseas movement of the division to Europe commenced on October 30, 1918.

The 8th Field Artillery Brigade, 8th Infantry Brigade, 16th Infantry Brigade headquarters, and the 319th Engineer Regiment were the only divisional units to go to France. The 13th and 62nd Infantry Regiments were at sea when recalled after the Armistice. The 12th Infantry did not leave its pre-embarkation point at Camp Mills, New York, because it was quarantined for Spanish influenza. The troops who did reach France became the garrison of Brest and assisted in building huge camps for troops about to embark for return to the United States. The 8th Infantry Regiment became part of the American occupation forces in Germany until August 1919 and the remainder returned to the United States in January 1919, after which the division disbanded.

=== Interwar period ===
The 8th Division officially demobilized at Camp Lee, Virginia, in September 1919. The division was partially reconstituted on 24 March 1923, allotted to the Third Corps Area for mobilization purposes, and assigned to the III Corps. Camp George G. Meade, Maryland, was its designated mobilization station for reactivation. The 16th Infantry Brigade (12th and 34th Infantry Regiments), the 1st Battalion, 16th Field Artillery Regiment, the 15th Ordnance Company, and the 8th Tank Company (Light) were assigned to the division in June 1923 as Regular Army active units, and formed the force from which the remainder of the division would be reactivated in the event of war. The commanding general of the brigade was considered the division commander for planning purposes. The 16th Infantry Brigade was stationed at Fort Howard, Maryland, from 1922 to 1928; Fort Hunt, Virginia, from 1928 to 1931; in Washington, D.C., from 1931 to 1936; and at Fort Meade from 1936 to the activation of the division.

The division headquarters was organized in April 1926 at Philadelphia, Pennsylvania, as a "Regular Army Inactive" (RAI) unit using personnel of the Organized Reserve, and by mid-1927, most of the division's other inactive elements were also organized as such. The active units of the division conducted annual training with the III and XIII Corps and the 79th, 80th, and 99th Divisions. Summer training camps were usually conducted at Camp Meade.

The 16th Infantry Brigade's 12th and 34th Infantry Regiments, reinforced by the 3d Cavalry and the District of Columbia National Guard's 260th Coast Artillery, were called out on 28 July 1932 to quell potential trouble from the Bonus Army in Washington, D.C. The 12th Infantry was ordered to clear the United States Capitol and the camps on the Anacostia Flats of the veterans that afternoon. From June 1936 to August 1937, the 16th Brigade was commanded by Lorenzo D. Gasser, who went on to serve as the Army's assistant chief of staff for personnel (G-1) and Deputy Chief of Staff of the United States Army.

The division was also provisionally organized in 1939 for the First Army Maneuvers at Manassas, Virginia, with the 16th Brigade reinforced by the 66th Infantry (Light Tanks). In preparation for becoming a "triangular" division, the 8th Infantry Division was reactivated on 1 July 1940 at Fort Jackson, South Carolina, less Reserve personnel, and assigned to the I Corps .

=== World War II ===
- Activated: 1 July 1940 at Camp Jackson, South Carolina
- Trained at Fort Leonard Wood, Missouri, in late 1942
- Trained at Camp Laguna, Arizona, in 1943
- Overseas: 5 December 1943
- Days of combat: 266.
- Distinguished Unit Citations: 5
- Awards: Medal of Honor – 3; Distinguished Service Cross (United States) – 33; Distinguished Service Medal (United States) – 2; Silver Star – 768; LM – 12; DFC – 2; SM – 24; BSM – 2,874; PH – 1; AM – 107.
- Returned to U.S.: 10 July 1945.
- Inactivated: at Fort Leonard Wood, Missouri, 20 November 1945.

==== Division organization ====
The 8th Infantry Division consisted of the following units:

8th Infantry Division organization (click to enlarge)

- 8th Infantry Division
  - 8th Infantry Division Headquarters
  - 8th Cavalry Reconnaissance Troop (Mechanized) (M3 scout cars and then M8 Greyhound armored cars)
  - 13th Infantry Regiment
    - Headquarters and Headquarters Company
    - 3× Infantry battalions
      - each battalion consists of: 1× Headquarters and Headquarters Company, 3× Rifle companies, 1× Heavy Weapons Company
    - Cannon Company (T12 Gun Motor Carriages and T19 Howitzer Motor Carriages, later replaced by either M3 105mm towed howitzers or M7 Priest self propelled howitzers)
    - Anti-Tank Company (M3 37mm anti-tank guns, which were replaced by 1944 with M1 57mm anti-tank guns)
    - Service Company
  - 28th Infantry Regiment
    - same organization as 13th Infantry Regiment
  - 34th Infantry Regiment (relieved from assignment to the division on 22 November 1941 and assigned to the Philippine Department)
    - same organization as 13th Infantry Regiment
  - 121st Infantry Regiment (Georgia Army National Guard; assigned to the division on 22 November 1941)
    - same organization as 13th Infantry Regiment
  - 8th Infantry Division Artillery
    - Headquarters and Headquarters Battery
    - 28th Field Artillery Battalion
      - Headquarters and Headquarters Battery
      - 3× Batteries (M1 155mm towed howitzers)
      - Service Battery
    - 43rd Field Artillery Battalion
      - Headquarters and Headquarters Battery
      - 3× Batteries (M2 105mm towed howitzers)
      - Service Battery
    - 45th Field Artillery Battalion
      - same organization as 43rd Field Artillery Battalion
    - 56th Field Artillery Battalion
      - same organization as 43rd Field Artillery Battalion
  - Headquarters Special Troops
    - Headquarters Company, 8th Infantry Division
    - 8th Signal Company
    - 8th Quartermaster Company
    - 708th Ordnance Light Maintenance Company
    - 8th Military Police Platoon
    - 8th Infantry Division Band (attached)
  - 12th Engineer Combat Battalion
    - Headquarters and Headquarters and Service Company
    - 3× Engineer combat companies
  - 8th Medical Battalion
    - Headquarters and Headquarters Detachment
    - 3× Collecting companies
    - Clearing Company

Major General William C. McMahon was relieved shortly after the division arrived in Normandy. His replacement, Major General Donald A. Stroh was temporarily relieved during the Hurtgen fighting; the death of his son Harry, a pilot in the U.S. Army Air Forces who was shot down over Brittany, had made a deep psychological impact. After a rest, Stroh went on to command the 106th Infantry Division.

==== Combat chronicle ====
During World War II, the 8th Infantry Division was sent to Europe to fight against the Axis. After training in Northern Ireland, the division would begin its training for its eventual role in the Normandy Campaign. The 8th Infantry Division landed on Utah Beach, Normandy, 4 July 1944, and entered combat on 7 July. The Division would go into action in support of actions in the Battle of La Haye-du-Puits, with the Division relieving the 82nd Airborne Division and moving south east of La Haye Du Puits towards the village of Lessary. Fighting in brutal hedgerow fighting the 8th would suffer heavy losses. The division acting as the far left flank of Operation Cobra would cross the Ay River on July 26 and move southward down the Norman coast before eventually crossing into Brittany after the 4th Armored Division secured a crossing over the Selune River at Avranches. Shortly after crossing into Brittany, the division captured the French cities of Rennes and Brest. pushed through Rennes, 8 August, and attacked Brest, France in September. When U.S. Brigadier General Charles Canham, who was at the time the deputy commander of the 8th Infantry Division, arrived to accept the surrender of German troops in Brest, the commander of the Brest garrison, General Hermann-Bernhard Ramcke asked the lower-ranking man to show his credentials. Canham pointed to his nearby troops and said "These are my credentials". That phrase has since become the 8th Infantry Division's motto.

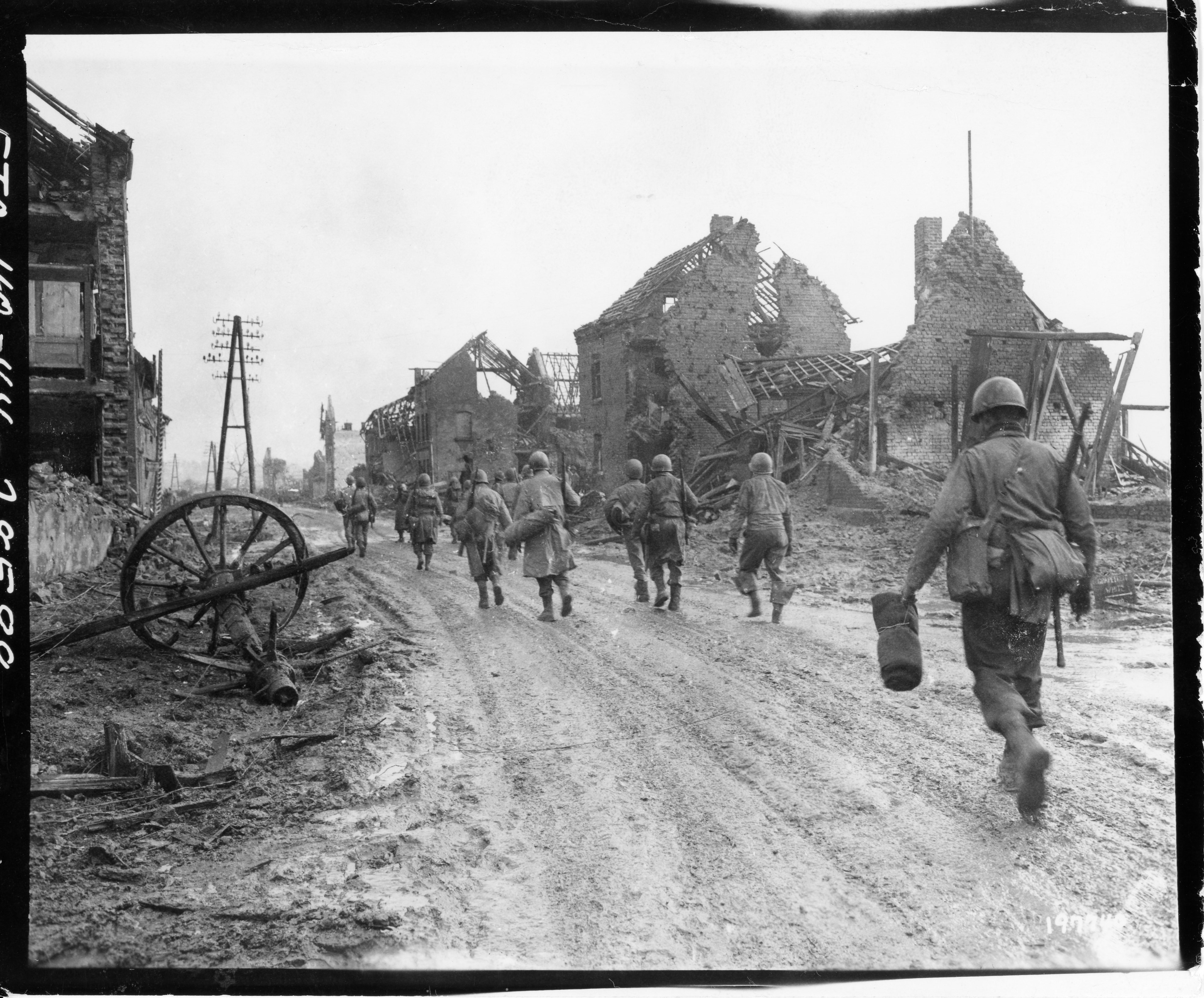
American infantrymen of Company I, 121st Infantry Regiment move through Hurtgen, Germany, on their way to the front lines, December 1944.

Following these actions, the 8th turned eastward toward the German border, taking part in the heavy fighting in the Hürtgen Forest in November 1944. The Crozon Peninsula was cleared on 19 September, and the division drove across France to Luxembourg, moved to the Hürtgen Forest, 20 November, cleared Hürtgen on the 28th and Brandenberg, 3 December, and pushed on to the Roer.

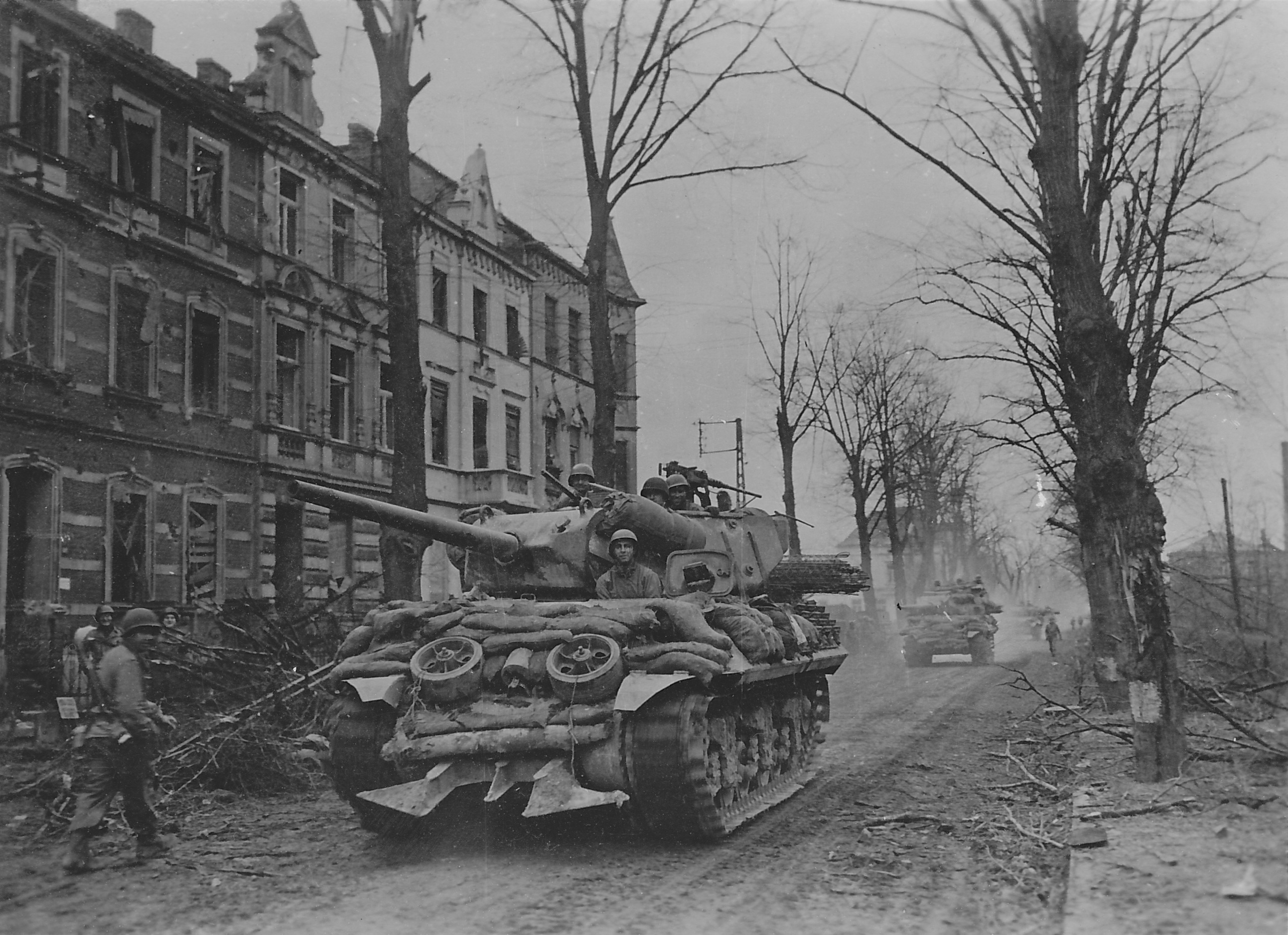
B Company of 644th Tank Destroyer Battalion, attached to the 8th Infantry Division, move into Düren on 24 February 1945.

That river was crossed on 23 February 1945, Düren taken on the 25th and the Erft Canal crossed on the 28th. The 8th reached the Rhine near Rodenkirchen, 7 March, and maintained positions along the river near Koeln. In early March 1945, the 8th had advanced into the Rhineland. It fought its way into the Ruhr region the following month.

On 6 April the division attacked northwest to aid in the destruction of enemy forces in the Ruhr Pocket, and by the 17th had completed its mission. After security duty, the division, under operational control of the British Second Army, drove across the Elbe, 1 May, and penetrated to Schwerin when the war in Europe ended.

On 2 May 1945, as it advanced into northern Germany, the 8th Infantry Division encountered the Neuengamme concentration camp Wöbbelin subcamp, near the city of Ludwigslust. The SS had established Wöbbelin in early February 1945 to house concentration camp prisoners who had been evacuated from other Nazi camps to prevent their liberation by the Allies. Wöbbelin held some 5,000 inmates, many of whom suffered from starvation and disease. The sanitary conditions at the camp when the 8th Infantry Division and the 82nd Airborne Division arrived were deplorable. There was little food or water, and some prisoners had resorted to cannibalism. In the first week after liberation, more than 200 inmates died. In the aftermath, the United States Army ordered the townspeople in Ludwigslust to visit the camp and bury the dead.

The 8th Infantry Division was recognized as a liberating unit by the U.S. Army's Center of Military History and the United States Holocaust Memorial Museum in 1988.

==== Casualties ====
- Total battle casualties: 13,986
- Killed in action: 2,532
- Wounded in action: 10,057
- Missing in action: 729
- Prisoner of war: 668

==== Assignments in ETO ====
- 30 November 1943: Attached to First Army.
- 24 December 1943: XV Corps.
- 1 July 1944: VIII Corps, attached to First Army.
- 1 August 1944: VIII Corps, Third Army, 12th Army Group.
- 5 September 1944: VIII Corps, Ninth Army, 12th Army Group.
- 22 October 1944: VIII Corps, First Army, 12th Army Group.
- 19 November 1944: V Corps.
- 18 December 1944: VII Corps.
- 20 December 1944: Attached, with the entire First Army, to the British 21st Army Group.
- 22 December 1944: XIX Corps, Ninth Army (attached to British 21st Army Group), 12th Army Group.
- 3 February 1945: VII Corps, First Army, 12th Army Group.
- 2 April 1945: XVIII (Abn) Corps.
- 26 April 1945: XVIII (Abn) Corps, Ninth Army, 12th Army Group, but attached for operations to the British Second Army in the British 21st Army Group.

==== Commanders ====
  - Maj. Gen. Philip B. Peyton (June 1940 – December 1940)
  - Maj. Gen. James P. Marley (December 1940 – February 1941)
  - Maj. Gen. William E. Shedd (February 1941)
  - Maj. Gen. Henry Terrell Jr. (March 1941)
  - Maj. Gen. James P. Marley (April 1941 – July 1942)
  - Maj. Gen. Paul E. Peabody (August 1942 – January 1943)
  - Maj. Gen. William C. McMahon (February 1943 – July 1944)
  - Maj. Gen. Donald A. Stroh (July 1944 – December 1944)
  - Maj. Gen. William G. Weaver (December 1944 – February 1945)
  - Maj. Gen. Bryant E. Moore (February 1945 – November 1945)
  - Maj. Gen. William M. Miley (November 1945 to inactivation).

==== Campaigns ====
1. Normandy;
2. Northern France;
3. Rhineland;
4. Ardennes-Alsace;
5. Central Europe

==== Decorations ====
1. Luxembourg Croix de Guerre, Streamer embroidered LUXEMBOURG (8th Infantry Division cited; DA GO 59, 1969)

==== Medals of Honor ====
Three soldiers of the 8th Division were awarded the Medal of Honor in World War II.

- Private First Class Ernest W. Prussman, 13th Infantry Regiment. Prussman took over his squad on 8 September 1944 during the advance on Les Coates [wrong transliteration of Loscoat, near Brest] in Brittany, and disarmed several Germans, including a machine gun crew. Shot by a German rifleman, his dying act was to unleash a hand grenade that killed the man who shot him. His Medal of Honor was awarded posthumously.
- Private First Class Walter C. Wetzel, 13th Infantry Regiment. As acting squad leader in the regimental Anti-Tank Company, PFC Wetzel defended his platoon's command post from an enemy attack on 3 April 1945. Wetzel threw himself on either 1 or 2 enemy grenades (sources vary) thrown into the C.P. His Medal of Honor was awarded posthumously.
- Staff Sergeant John W. Minick, Company I, 121st Infantry Regiment. After his battalion was halted by enemy minefields during an advance on 21 November 1944 during the Hurtgen fighting, he led four men through the obstacle, then successfully destroyed an enemy machine gun post that had opened fire on the small party. Moving forward again, he single-handedly engaged an entire company of enemy soldiers, killing 20 men and capturing 20 more. Resuming the advance, he tried to scout through another minefield, but detonated a mine in the attempt. His Medal of Honor was awarded posthumously.

=== Cold War ===
The 8th Infantry Division was reactivated in 1950 as a training division at Fort Jackson, South Carolina and in 1954 became a regular infantry division. In 1956-57 it was sent to West Germany, initially on a temporary basis in Operation Gyroscope, but remained in West Germany for decades. The Division's First Brigade (with subordinate units) was stationed in Mainz, the Second Brigade (with subordinate units) was stationed in Baumholder, and the Third Brigade (with subordinate units) was stationed in Mannheim (Sullivan and Coleman Barracks). In 1974, an amendment by Senator Sam Nunn of Georgia led to two more brigades being organized for European service. The 4th Brigade, 4th Infantry Division ("Brigade-76") was dispatched to Europe in the fall of 1976. It was stationed in Wiesbaden, attached to the 8th Infantry Division, and for eight years, made it unique - the 8th ID became the Army's only four-brigade division. In 1984, the 4th Brigade was inactivated and the division's size fell to the standard three brigades. From December 1957, until it was inactivated in January 1992, the 8th Infantry Division was headquartered at Bad Kreuznach.

From the late 1950s until the early 1960s, the 8th Infantry Division was organized as a partially Airborne Pentomic division, with two of its five battle groups (the 1st Airborne Battle Group, 504th Infantry, and 1st Airborne Battle Group, 505th Infantry) on jump status. In 1963 the division was reorganized into a brigade structure with the 1st Brigade on jump status, and 1-504th was reorganized and reflagged as the 1st Battalion (Abn), 509th Infantry and 1-505th as the 2d Battalion (Abn), 509th Infantry. Supporting units throughout the division (for example, one field artillery battalion, one company of the engineer battalion, one platoon of the MP company, etc.) were also on jump status. The 8th Infantry Division operated its own jump school at Wiesbaden Air Base to support its 1st Brigade as well as other elements of the United States Army, Europe. In 1973 elements of the 1st Brigade were transferred to Vicenza, Italy, to establish a separate Airborne battalion combat team (1-509th INF) and the two Airborne infantry battalions were reorganized and reflagged as the 2d Battalion, 28th Infantry and the 2d Battalion, 87th Infantry. The reorganized 1st Brigade included a tank unit, the 4th Battalion, 69th Armor.

=== Gulf War ===
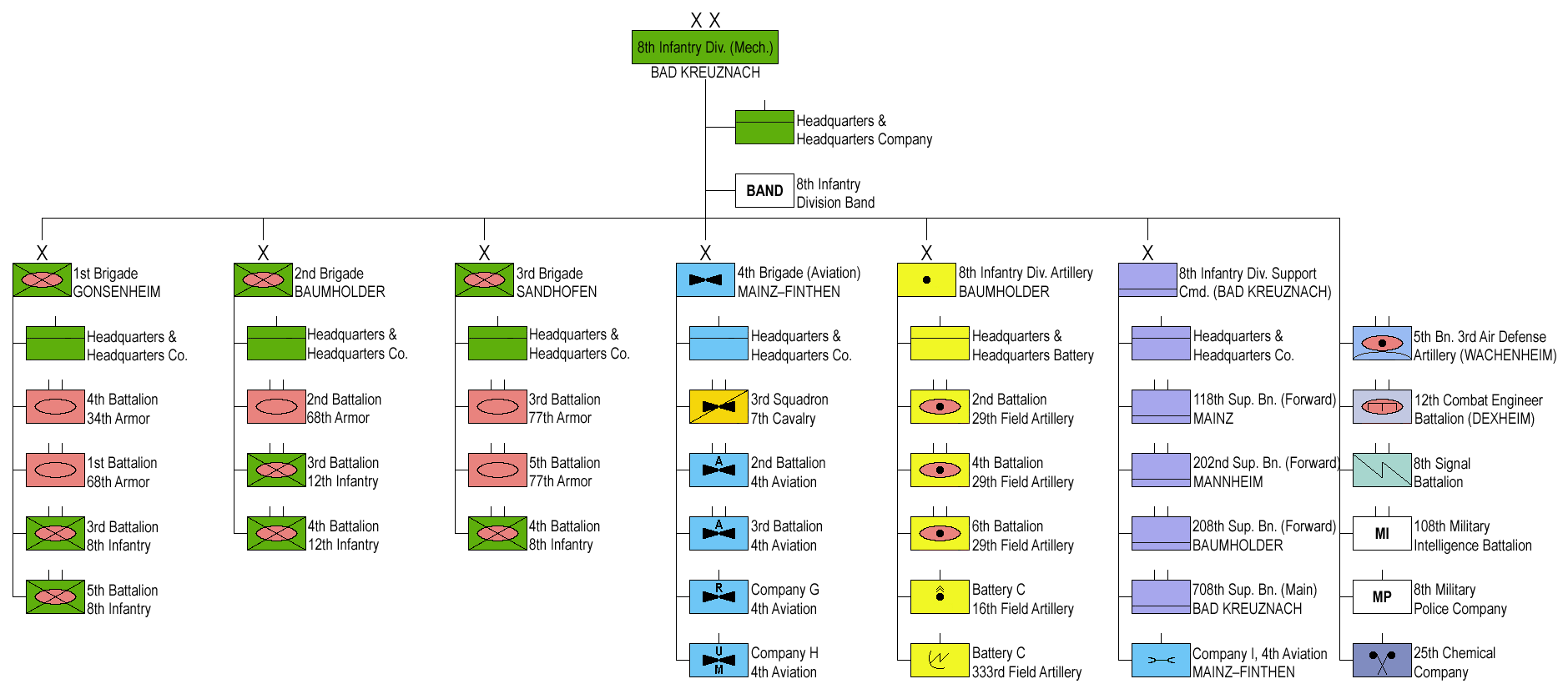
US Army 8th Infantry Division Structure in 1989

Four battalions deployed to Operation Desert Storm.

- Attached to 3d Armored Division:
  - 4th Battalion, 34th Armor
  - 12th Engineer Battalion
  - 5th Battalion, 3d Air Defense Artillery
- Attached to the 42d Field Artillery Brigade:
  - 2d Battalion, 29th Field Artillery (M109A2/A3 155mm SP)

=== Deactivation ===
The 8th Infantry Division deactivated on 17 January 1992, with some elements being "reflagged" as part the 1st Armored Division, which had been stationed in southeastern West Germany.

== Commanders ==
- Brig. Gen. Frank C. McConnell, Aug 1950 – Jan 1951
- Maj. Gen. Harry J. Collins, Jan 1951 – Feb 1952
- Maj. Gen. Whitfield P. Shepard, Feb 1952 – Jan 1953
- Brig. Gen. John A. Dabney, Jan 1953 – Jan 1954
- Maj. Gen. Riley F. Ennis, Jan 1954 – Jun 1954
- Maj. Gen. Harry J. Collins, Jun 1954 – Aug 1954
- Maj. Gen. Thomas L. Harold, Aug 1954 – Nov 1954
- Maj. Gen. Thomas L. Sherburne Jr., Sep 1954 – Nov 1954
- Maj. Gen. John G. Van Houten, Nov 1954 – Jan 1956
- Maj. Gen. Thomas M. Watlington, Jan 1956 – Aug 1957
- Brig. Gen. Harold K. Johnson, Aug 1957
- Maj. Gen. Philip F. Lindeman Jr., Aug 1957 – Mar 1959
- Maj. Gen. Lloyd R. Moses, Mar 1959 – Oct 1960
- Maj. Gen. Edgar C. Doleman, Oct 1960 – Oct 1961
- Maj. Gen. Andrew Goodpaster, Oct 1961 – Oct 1962
- Maj. Gen. Stanley R. Larsen, Nov 1962 – Apr 1964
- Maj. Gen. Joseph R. Russ, Apr 1964 – Apr 1966
- Maj. Gen. Patrick F. Cassidy, Apr 1966 – Jun 1968
- Maj. Gen. George L. Mabry Jr., Jun 1968 – Feb 1969
- Maj. Gen. Elmer H. Almquist, Feb 1969 – Aug 1970
- Maj. Gen. Donald V. Rattan, Aug 1970 – 19May 72
- Maj. Gen. Frederic E. Davison May 72 Oct 73
- Maj. Gen. Joseph C. McDonough, Oct 1973 – 19Jul 75
- Maj. Gen. John R. D. Cleland, Jul 1975 – Jun 1977
- Maj. Gen. Paul F. Gorman, Jun 1977 – May 1979
- Maj. Gen. William J. Livsey, May 1979 – Jun 1981
- Maj. Gen. Carl E. Vuono, Jun 1981 – Jun 1983
- Maj. Gen. Charles W. Dyke, Jun 1983 – Jun 1985
- Maj. Gen. Orren R. Whiddon, Jun 1985 – Jun 1987
- Maj. Gen. Calvin A. H. Waller, Jun 1987 – Jun 1989
- Maj. Gen. David M. Maddox, Jul 1989 – Nov 1990
- Maj. Gen. John P. Otjen, Nov 1990 – Jan 1992

== In popular culture ==
2010 movie A-Team, General Morrison (portrayed by actor Gerald McRaney) wears the UCP version of the division patch. Soldiers in the camp are seen wearing the same patch in UCP.

In the 1962 movie The Longest Day, a soldier of the 12th Engineer Battalion can be seen on Omaha Beach. This is recognizable by the 8th Infantry Division Patch on his left shoulder.

In the 2002 WW2 Hallmark movie, "Silent Night", the US soldiers wear the 8th Infantry Division Patch.

The 2022 real-time strategy video game Warno features the 8th Infantry Division as a playable battlegroup based on its order of battle in 1989 in the Fulda Gap.
