= Spring City, Pennsylvania =

Borough in Pennsylvania, US

- Borough
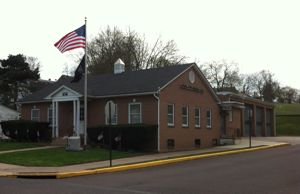
- Spring City Borough Hall

- Location in Chester County and the U.S. state of Pennsylvania

- Location in Pennsylvania Location in the United States
- Coordinates: 40°10′40″N 75°32′59″W
- Country: United States
- State: Pennsylvania
- County: Chester

Area
  - Total: 0.82 sq mi (2.13 km^{2})
  - Land: 0.77 sq mi (1.99 km^{2})
  - Water: 0.054 sq mi (0.14 km^{2})
- Elevation: 184 ft (56 m)

Population (2020)
  - Total: 3,494
  - Density: 4,551.6/sq mi (1,757.39/km^{2})
- Time zone: UTC-5 (EST)
  - Summer (DST): UTC-4 (EDT)
- ZIP Code: 19475
- Area codes: 610 and 484
- FIPS code: 42-72920
- Website: www.springcitypa.gov

Spring City is a borough in Chester County, Pennsylvania, United States. The population was 3,494 at the 2020 census. Spring City is a member of the Spring-Ford Area School District.

It is situated along the Schuylkill River, which divides Chester and Montgomery counties. Directly across the river is the borough of Royersford.

== Geography ==
Spring City is located at 40°10′40″N 75°32′59″W (40.177866, -75.549828). According to the U.S. Census Bureau, the borough has a total area of 0.8 square miles (2.1 km^{2}), of which 0.1 square miles (0.26 km^{2}), or 7.32%, is water.

== Transportation ==
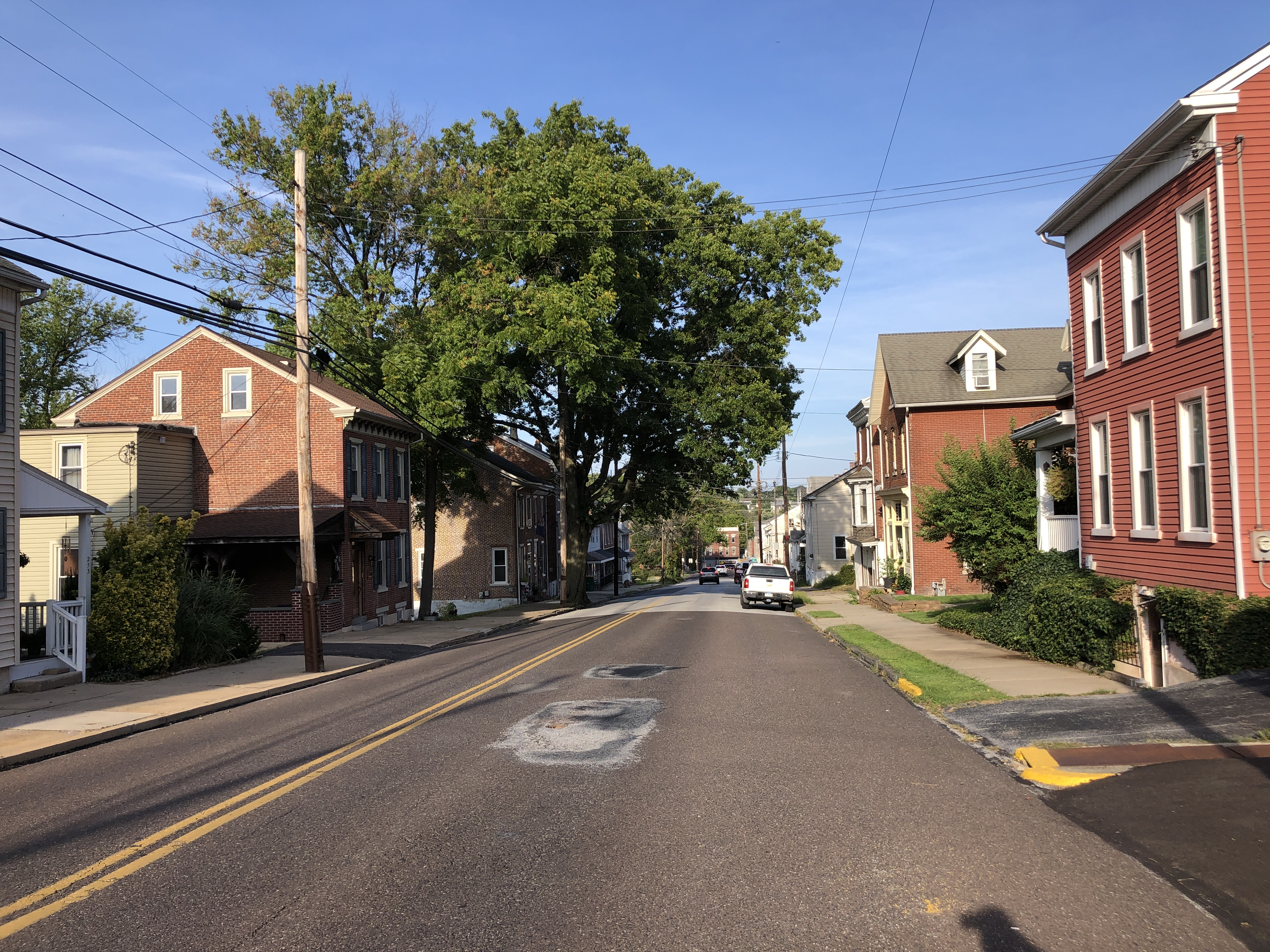
New Street in Spring City

As of 2007, there were 10.82 miles (17.41 km) of public roads in Spring City, of which 1.39 miles (2.24 km) were maintained by Pennsylvania Department of Transportation (PennDOT) and 9.43 miles (15.18 km) were maintained by the borough.

No numbered highways serve Spring City directly. Main thoroughfares in the borough include Main Street, New Street and Bridge Street.

== Demographics ==
Historical population
Census	Pop.	Note	%±
1880	1,112		—
1890	1,797		61.6%
1900	2,566		42.8%
1910	2,880		12.2%
1920	2,944		2.2%
1930	2,903		−1.4%
1940	3,022		4.1%
1950	3,258		7.8%
1960	3,162		−2.9%
1970	3,578		13.2%
1980	3,389		−5.3%
1990	3,433		1.3%
2000	3,305		−3.7%
2010	3,323		0.5%
2020	3,494		5.1%
2021 (est.)	3,478	▼	−0.5%
U.S. Decennial Census

=== 2020 census ===
As of the 2020 census, Spring City had a population of 3,494. The median age was 39.6 years. 17.8% of residents were under the age of 18 and 17.7% of residents were 65 years of age or older. For every 100 females there were 96.8 males, and for every 100 females age 18 and over there were 93.7 males age 18 and over.

100.0% of residents lived in urban areas, while 0.0% lived in rural areas.

There were 1,632 households in Spring City, of which 24.0% had children under the age of 18 living in them. Of all households, 32.0% were married-couple households, 25.4% were households with a male householder and no spouse or partner present, and 32.8% were households with a female householder and no spouse or partner present. About 41.2% of all households were made up of individuals and 19.4% had someone living alone who was 65 years of age or older.

There were 1,712 housing units, of which 4.7% were vacant. The homeowner vacancy rate was 1.7% and the rental vacancy rate was 5.2%.

Racial composition as of the 2020 census
Race	Number	Percent
White	2,940	84.1%
Black or African American	163	4.7%
American Indian and Alaska Native	10	0.3%
Asian	39	1.1%
Native Hawaiian and Other Pacific Islander	0	0.0%
Some other race	105	3.0%
Two or more races	237	6.8%
Hispanic or Latino (of any race)	211	6.0%

=== 2010 census ===
At the 2010 census, the borough was 89.6% non-Hispanic White, 3.6% Black or African American, 0.1% Native American, 1.4% Asian, and 2.6% were two or more races. 3.4% of the population were of Hispanic or Latino ancestry .

=== 2000 census ===
At the 2000 census there were 3,305 people, 1,412 households, and 835 families in the borough. The population density was 4,321.9 inhabitants per square mile (1,668.7/km^{2}). There were 1,508 housing units at an average density of 1,972.0 per square mile (761.4/km^{2}). The racial makeup of the borough was 95.25% White, 1.94% African American, 0.51% Native American, 1.03% Asian, 0.06% Pacific Islander, 0.27% from other races, and 0.94% from two or more races. Hispanic or Latino of any race were 1.18%.

There were 1,412 households, 28.6% had children under the age of 18 living with them, 42.8% were married couples living together, 11.4% had a female householder with no husband present, and 40.8% were non-families. 33.9% of households were made up of individuals, and 8.9% were one person aged 65 or older. The average household size was 2.33 and the average family size was 3.03.

The age distribution was 23.8% under the age of 18, 8.3% from 18 to 24, 34.9% from 25 to 44, 21.7% from 45 to 64, and 11.3% 65 or older. The median age was 36 years. For every 100 females there were 102.5 males. For every 100 females age 18 and over, there were 102.0 males.

The median household income was $40,601 and the median family income was $52,292. Males had a median income of $36,866 versus $27,054 for females. The per capita income for the borough was $20,931. About 4.1% of families and 6.3% of the population were below the poverty line, including 7.4% of those under age 18 and 4.1% of those age 65 or over.

== Notable people ==
- Sherwood H. Hallman, recipient of the Medal of Honor for his actions in World War II
- James Rolfe, creator, Angry Video Game Nerd
- Chuck Sheetz, Emmy Award-winning animation director, The Simpsons
- Ham Wade, Major League Baseball player, New York Giants
