= Statue of Tom Brady =

Bronze sculpture in Foxborough, Massachusetts, U.S.

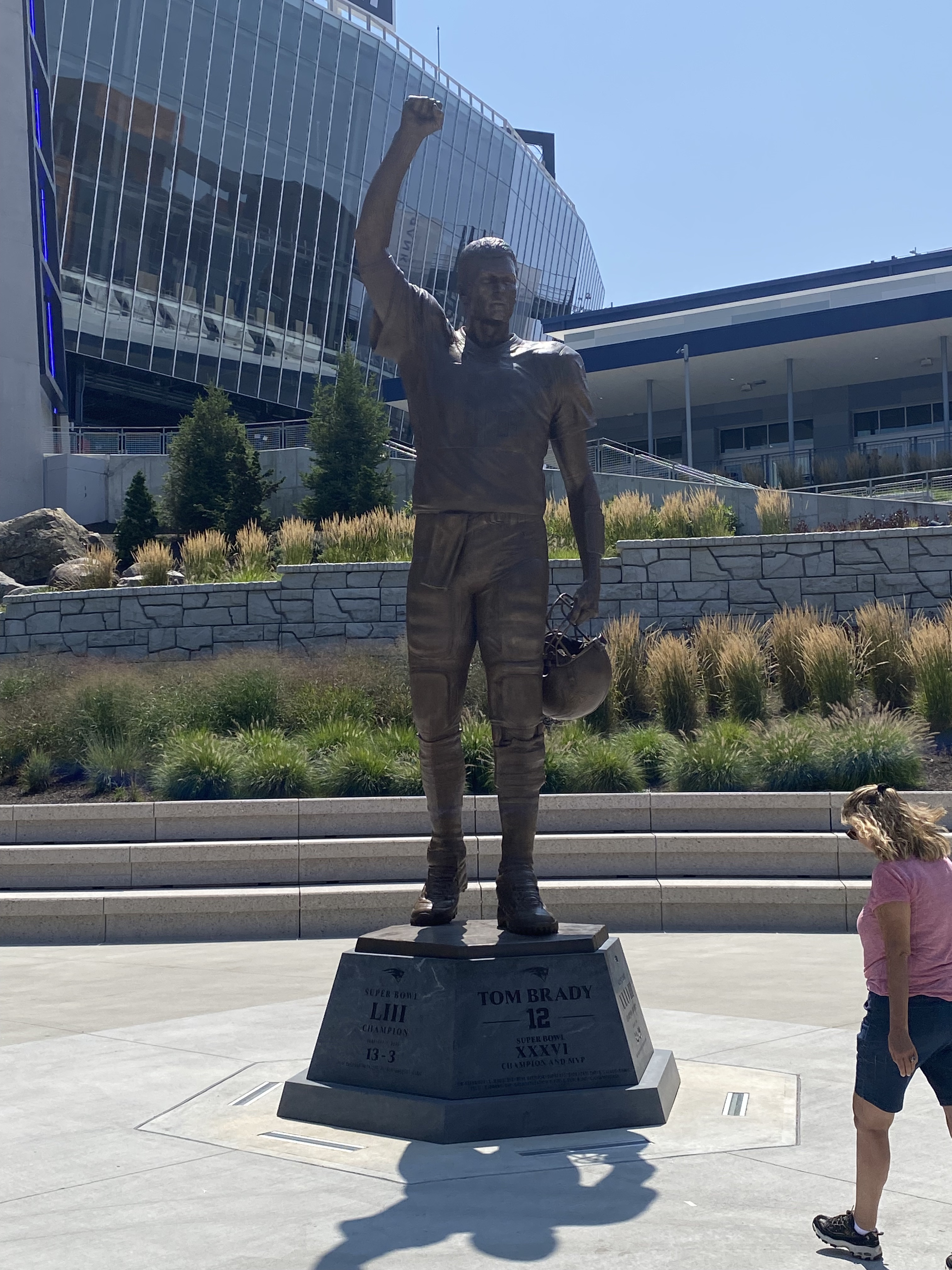
- Interactive map of Statue of Tom Brady
- Location: Outside Gillette Stadium in Foxborough, Massachusetts, U.S.
- Coordinates: 42°5′32.62″N 71°15′53.92″W
- Designer: Jeff Buccacio
- Type: Statue
- Material: Bronze (statue); Granite (base)
- Height: 12 feet (3.7 m) (statue) (Note: As measured head-to-toe.); 17 feet (5.2 m) (overall) (Note: Inclusive of the base and raised arm.)
- Weight: 1,800 lb (820 kg) (statue); 10,500 lb (4,800 kg) (base); 12,300 lb (5,600 kg) (total)
- Dedicated date: August 8, 2025
- Dedicated to: Tom Brady

The statue of Tom Brady is located in front of the north end of Gillette Stadium in Foxborough, Massachusetts, United States. Inclusive of its granite base, the bronze statue of former National Football League (NFL) quarterback Tom Brady weighs 12,300 pounds (5,600 kg) and stands 17 feet (5.2 m) tall. Plans for the statue were announced on June 12, 2024, by New England Patriots owner Robert Kraft, during Brady's Patriots Hall of Fame ceremony, and it was unveiled to the public on August 8, 2025.

== Background ==
On June 12, 2024, the New England Patriots celebrated Tom Brady's 20-year career with the franchise (Note: Brady also spent three seasons, at the end of his playing career, with the Tampa Bay Buccaneers.) in a dedicated three-hour event at Gillette Stadium, culminating with his induction into the Patriots Hall of Fame. During the event, team owner Robert Kraft also announced that Brady's number would be retired, and that a statue was commissioned as well. The statue was initially intended to be unveiled during an NFL on Fox game, for which Brady serves as lead color commentator, during the 2024 Patriots season. However, due to the Patriots poor record that season, Brady's NFL on Fox crew was not selected to broadcast any Patriots games. The unveiling of the statue was delayed until the preseason of the 2025 Patriots season, to ensure Brady's availability.

== Design ==
The sculpture depicts Brady raising his right arm in the air with a closed fist, and his left arm holding his Riddell VSR4 helmet, which he wore throughout the majority of his career. Measured head-to-toe, the figure of Brady stands 12 feet (3.7 m) tall—12 having been chosen to represent his uniform number with the team. The statue's overall height, including its base and the raised arm, (Note: The sculptor states the statue is 14.5 feet (4.4 m) tall including the raised fist, and the base is 2.5 feet (0.76 m) tall.) is 17 feet (5.2 m)—17 having been chosen to represent the number of his AFC East title wins. Kraft stated his intention was to have it "be larger than life, just like Tommy is." The hexagon-shaped base represents both the six New England states and the six Super Bowl titles that Brady won with the Patriots. Etched in the base is a list of those six Super Bowl victories. (Note: Super Bowl XXXVI (February 2002, Rams), Super Bowl XXXVIII (February 2004, Panthers), Super Bowl XXXIX (February 2005, Eagles), Super Bowl XLIX (February 2015, Seahawks), Super Bowl LI (February 2017, Falcons), Super Bowl LIII (February 2019, Rams))

Lead sculptor Jeff Buccacio, (Note: Buccacio's prior work includes a statue of Ernest W. Prussman, a Medal of Honor recipient, located in the Brighton neighborhood of Boston.) a native of Natick, Massachusetts, and a lifelong Patriots fan, spent 20,000 hours with his team throughout the process of finalizing the statue. The statue is considered fairly accurate to Brady's looks.

== Unveiling ==
The 30-minute unveiling ceremony occurred on August 8, 2025, prior to the Patriots preseason opener against the Washington Commanders, with a large crowd in attendance surrounding the plaza along with fans spectating in the stadium. Kraft and Brady both spoke at the event, which included Brady throwing a playful jab at his long-time AFC East foe, the New York Jets, stating: "This statue isn't just for Pats fans. It will also give Jets fans something to throw their beers at as they leave the stadium every year. Probably in the second quarter. Maybe in the third." A number of Brady's former teammates, family members, and friends were in attendance.
