= 12th Engineer Battalion (United States) =

12th Combat Engineer Battalion
- "Dual Prime" "Never Fails!"
- Active: 1 July 1940 — 1992?
- Country: United States
- Allegiance: Army
- Branch: 8th Infantry Division
- Type: Battalion
- Garrison/HQ: Ft. Jackson, South Carolina/ Anderson Barracks, Dexheim, West Germany
- Nickname(s): Tip of the Golden Arrow (Unofficial), Dual Primed/“Never Fails!”
- Motto(s): Id Perficiemus (We shall consummate the task!)
- Engagements: World War II; European Theatre; Normandy (with Arrowhead); Omaha Beach; Brittany; Ay River; Rennes; Battle of Brest; Rhineland; Luxembourg; Battle of the Hürtgen Forest; Düren; Ruhr Pocket; Central Europe; Operation Desert Storm
- Decorations: Phillip A. Connally Award 1979 Itschner Award 1979 - A Company, 12th Engineer Battalion Presidential Unit Citation (Army) HÜRTGEN FOREST Meritorious Unit Commendation, Streamer embroidered EUROPEAN THEATER 1944 Luxembourg Croix de Guerre, Streamer embroidered LUXEMBOURG

The 12th Combat Engineer Battalion was activated 1 July 1940, at Ft. Jackson, South Carolina as an organic element of the 8th Infantry Division In July 1944 the battalion deployed to the European Theatre, landing at Omaha Beach in support of D-Day. Subsequently, the Battalion participated in campaigns in Normandy, Northern France, Rhineland, and Central Europe, and Luxembourg.

After World War II the Battalion was inactivated on 25 October 1945 at Fort Leonard Wood, Missouri. It was reactivated on 17 August 1950 at Ft. Jackson, South Carolina again as an organic element of the 8th Infantry Division. The Battalion moved with the 8th Infantry Division to Nuremberg, Germany in October 1956. In December 1957 the Battalion was restationed at Anderson Barracks, Dexheim, Germany. Simultaneously with the relocation of the 8th Infantry Division Headquarters to Bad Kreuznach, Germany.

Motto: Id Perficiemus (We shall consummate the task!)

== Full history of unit ==
The Battalion was organized at Ft. Jackson, S.C. on July 1, 1940, under General orders no. 12, Headquarters, Fourth Corps Area. The cadre was picked from the 1st Engineers at Fort DuPont, Del., and from the 7th Engineers at Ft. Custer, MI. The remainder of personnel was received through voluntary enlistments, and the Selective Service.

At that time billets consisted of huts in the National Guard area of Fort Jackson. The first Commanding Officer was Major Patrick H. Tansey. Major Charles H.Mason took over the command in August 1941 and was subsequently followed by Major Edmund M. Fry. This change took place on August 22, 1942, and from December 1942 until February 1943, when Major Fry was sent to Engineer School, the command of the Battalion was administered by Major James C. Taylor. However, Major Fry returned to the outfit to remain the guiding hand through all the Battalion's campaigns.

The usual basic training was given the Battalion while at Ft. Jackson, and it was here that they also received their foretaste of what real combat would be like while they were on Carolina maneuvers in the fall of 1941. However, this proved to be a very minute taste of the real thing, although the combat test at the time was very convincing to a majority of the men.

Completion of the maneuvers found the outfit on the way back to Fort Jackson Where they were given more intensive training, and then used to supply the cadre for two new divisions. In the fall of 1942 the Battalion moved out amidst of many murmurings on the part of the men as to when things would really roll. This move involved large scale maneuvers in Tennessee. The Battalion was lodged at Camp Forest, Tennessee in a tent city, While its strength was brought almost up to normal. The weather at this time was bitterly cold, And right in the middle of one of the worst cold spells, the Battalion moved to Fort Leonard Wood, Missouri. This move was accomplished by truck, And by the time the organization reached their destination, it seemed problematical in the minds of many of the men whether they would ever again resume a semblance of straight posture. The weather remained icy during the whole of their stay at Fort Leonard Wood, and those who returned from the European war claim that even after the fighting on the other side they were last being thawed out from the Paul Bunyan cold.

The next move was a distinct change. The battalion took to the road again and ended up in the lively and bustling Laguna Desert Camp in Arizona. While at this camp-site, Id Perficiemus — "We Shall Consummate the task"— is the motto that has inspired the 12th Engineer Battalion since it was constituted at Ft. Jackson, South Carolina on July 1, 1940. For the past two decades, the 12th Engineers have proven time and time again that it is capable of performing any task, in war or peace. Eventually the 12th engineer Battalion had its headquarters in Dexheim, at Anderson Barracks undertaking Engineer construction throughout the 8th Infantry Division. The battalion was heavily equipped with a vast array of construction machinery capable of supporting any engineer task required to support the 8th Infantry Division.

Its role was the division Engineer Battalion. The 12th had the mission of providing general engineer support to the various elements of the division. Four Combat Engineer Companies support the three infantry brigades with the construction of barriers, laying and clearing of minefields, demolition operations and limited construction operations. In addition, each of the four companies was equipped with a Combat Engineer vehicle which carries a bulldozer blade and a 165 mm demolition gun capable of destroying enemy barricades, and fortified positions.

Echo bridge company provided the Division with its river-crossing capability. Equipped with Mobile Assault Bridge (MAB) units which can be driven on land, and then launched into water to link up with one another (to form a complete bridge, or a series of ferries) the MAB's enable the entire division to cross the Rhein River. The bridge company is also equipped with Armored Vehicle Launched Bridges, which can be used to bridge 60-foot streams.

The 12th Engineers had a platoon of heavy earth moving equipment, including 5-ton dump trucks, rough terrain cranes, and road graders. In addition, an atomic demolition munitions platoon gave the division an added defense capability.

The 12th Engineers were constantly training in their Engineer Support Role, conducting bridge operations on the Rhein, performing earth-moving tasks in community assistance projects, and constantly demonstrating readiness to live up to their motto.

== Decorations and timeline ==
- Training for deployment Sept 1942 to November 1943
- December 1943 arrived in Ireland.
- 6 June, 1944 landed at Normandy across Omaha Beach (have found differing references)( 8th Infantry Division Wikipedia page has the Division landing at Utah Beach, citing U.S. Holocaust Memorial Museum as a source)
- Presidential Unit Citation (Army), Streamer embroidered HURTGEN FOREST (12th Engr Cbt Bn cited for period 21-28 Nov 1944; WDGO 21, 1947
- World War II distinguished Unit Streamer embroidered Hurtgen Forest.
- Meritorious Unit Commendation, Streamer embroidered EUROPEAN THEATER 1944 (12th Engr Cbt Bn cited for period 8 Jul-8 Sept 1944; GO 166 Hq, 8th Inf Div, 25 May 1945)
- World War II Meritorious Unit Streamer embroidered European Theatre, 9 June 1945.
- World War II Meritorious Unit Streamer embroidered European Theatre, 10 June 1945.
- Headquarters and Service Company awarded Meritorious Unit Streamer embroidered European Theatre.
- Campaign Streamers for: Normandy, Northern France, Rhineland, and Central Europe, and Luxembourg
- Redesignated as the 12th Combat Engineer Battalion 15 June 1954.
- Luxembourg Croix de Guerre, Streamer embroidered LUXEMBOURG (8th Inf Div cited; DAGO 59, 1969) Luxembourg Croix de Guerre, Streamer embroidered LUXEMBOURG (8th Inf Div cited; DAGO 59, 1969)
- Itschner Award 1979 - A Company, 12th Engineer Battalion - For the most outstanding engineer company in the USArmy.
- Phillip A. Connally Award 1979 for the best field mess in USAREUR and Runner-up in the RA
- Liberation and Defense of Kuwait
