= Sherwood H. Hallman =

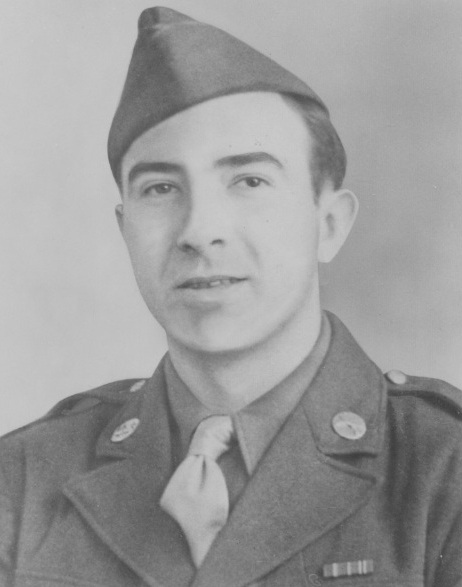
- Born: October 29, 1913; Spring City, Pennsylvania, US
- Died: September 14, 1944 (aged 30); Brest, France
- Burial place: Brittany American Cemetery, Saint-James, France
- Military career
- Branch: United States Army
- Service years: 1943–1944
- Rank: Staff sergeant
- Units: 2nd Battalion, 175th Infantry Regiment, 29th Infantry Division
- Conflicts: World War II: Battle for Brest †
- Awards: Medal of Honor

Sherwood Henry Hallman (October 29, 1913 – September 14, 1944) was a United States Army soldier and a recipient of the United States military's highest decoration—the Medal of Honor—for his actions in World War II.

== Biography ==
Hallman was born in Spring City, Pennsylvania on October 29, 1913, a son of Harry and Emma Hallman. He had two brothers, Lester and Raymond, and two sisters, Elaine and Marian. His father Harry was a postal worker.

Sherwood attended Spring City High School, Class of 1931, where he played football. Sherwood was a member of the Zion Lutheran Church just outside Spring City. Sherwood left school in his 2nd year of High School, to help support his family during the great depression. He loved animals, especially horses. He obtained a job at the Spring City Race Track just outside town on Wall St, which hosted harness races. Sherwood worked grooming horses for Harvey Stauffer. Harvey also owned Stauffer's Market on Main St, which later moved around the corner on Bridge St. He offered Sherwood a job at his market after the race season ended, and taught him the butcher trade. After Harvey died his children ran the business, but had to downsize, and laid Sherwood off. In 1939 Sherwood then began his own business – Sherry's Modern Market – a grocery store on wheels. He bought a step truck, and had it customized. Sherry's market offered door-to-door sales of groceries, produce, poultry, meat and dairy products. The Store at Your Door" shopping option.

One afternoon in 1941 when Hallman stopped by the A. C. Roberts Co. plant in Kimberton to replenish his meat supply, he met Virginia Dieter working in the office. They were married January 4, 1942, and their son, Sherwood Jr., was born October 25. Hallman's draft notice arrived two weeks after his son's birth.

On January 8, 1943, Hallman entered the service. He received his training at Fort McClellan, Alabama, at their Infantry Replacement Training Center. He spent five months training stateside. When he arrived in England, as Private First Class Hallman; he was assigned to Company F, a rifle company in the 2nd Battalion of the 175th Infantry Regiment, which was part of the 29th Division. A rifle company was a bad place in which to spend the war. Once it reached the front line it never left. The men were in constant danger. Hallman spent the next year in England training rigorously for the Normandy invasion. On D-day his regiment spent the day in LSTs bobbing up and down in the Atlantic just off Omaha Beach. They landed there on June 6, 1944. On the next day his company was hit by British dive bombers who thought they were Germans. The attack left five men dead and 19 wounded, including Hallman. He was sent to an English hospital for treatment and just 17 days later returned to his company to resume the fighting in France.

In September, his division was trying to capture the city of Brest, on the tip of the Brittany Peninsula, south and west of Normandy. Brest was a key city, and housed a forward German U-Boat base; submarines that were devastating Allied supply ships. Despite repeated attacks, the enemy repelled his division for 3 days. A strong enemy position at Fort Keranroux, protecting the city, seemed impenetrable. Sherwood's Battalion came under withering fire from several interlocking enemy positions on September 13 and their advance was halted. Although he normally carried a BAR (Browning Automatic Rifle – a heavy 30 caliber hand held machine gun), Sherwood exchanged it with one of his men for the lighter M1 Carbine, giving him the mobility he needed. Sherwood instructed his men to give him covering fire, and then single-handedly maneuvered to advance on the enemy despite the intense enemy fire. He charged the enemy position firing his carbine and throwing grenades. When Sherwood broke through into their midst, his ammunition was expended. He decided to bluff and ordered their surrender pointing his empty carbine at them.

The resulting gap in the German line enabled the GIs to advance another 2,000 yards, to a point from which they launched a successful attack the following day on Fort Keranroux, one of the keys to the defense of Brest. Hallman came through the attack unscathed. The following day, Sept. 14, he was shot by a sniper and fell mortally wounded. He was awarded a second Purple Heart, as well as the Medal of Honor for his actions on September 13. The Medal of Honor was presented to his wife and 2-year-old son, Sherwood Hallman II, during a ceremony at Fairmount Park Military Police headquarters in Philadelphia on May 31, 1945. The presentation to the family was made by Brigadier General Malcolm F. Lindsey, Commanding General Indiantown Gap Military Cemetery.

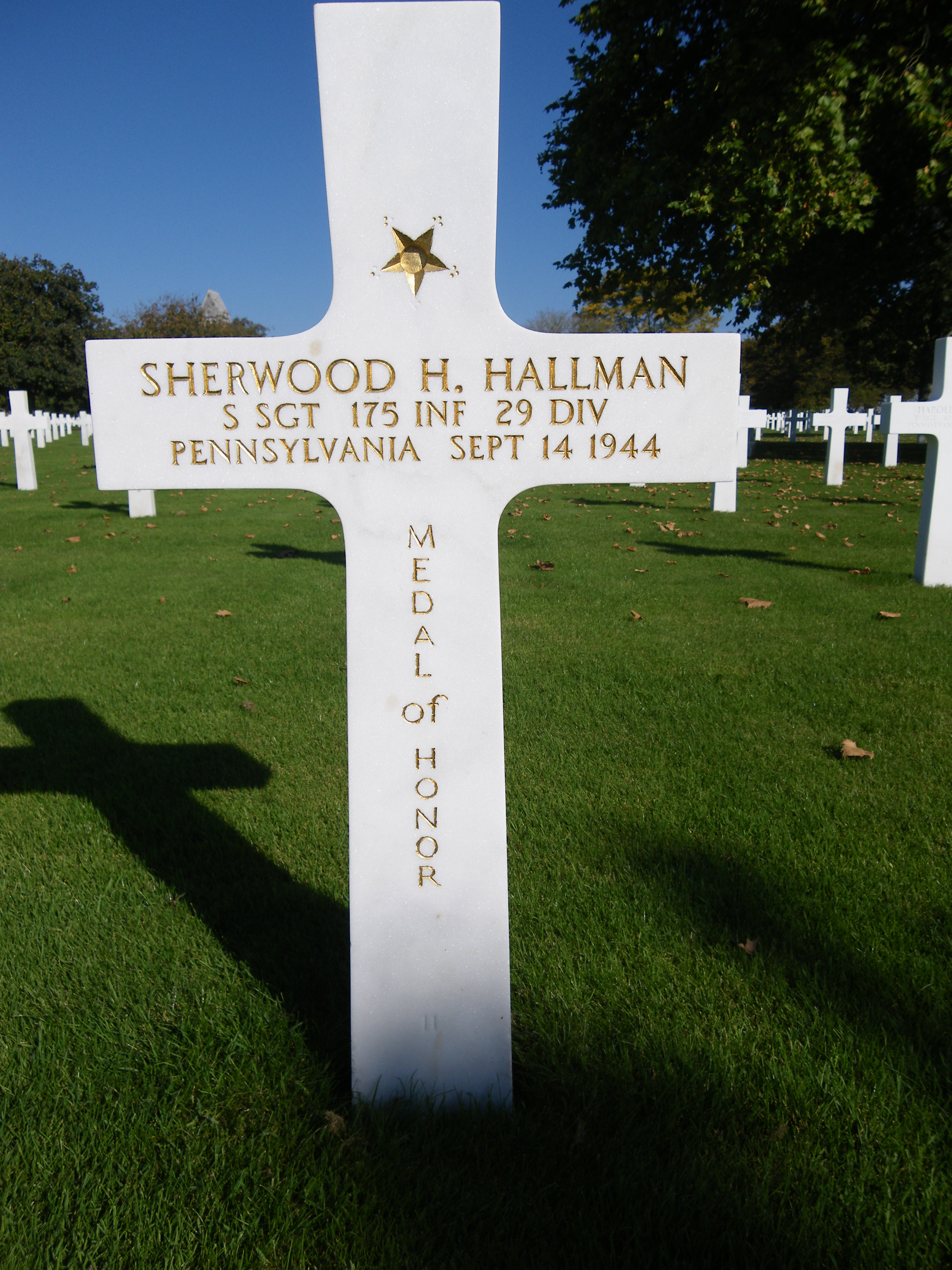
Hallman's grave marker at Brittany American Cemetery

Staff Sergeant Sherwood Hallman was buried with full military honors at the Brittany American Cemetery, St. James France. This cemetery is sometimes called the forgotten cemetery, as the American Cemetery above Omaha Beach overshadows it, even though there are 4,410 Americans buried in the St. James Cemetery.

The Walter T. Caffrey American Legion Post 602 erected a memorial monument dedicated to Sergeant Hallman at the Spring City Borough Hall on November 18, 1967.

Hallman joined the army from his birthplace of Spring City, Pennsylvania, in January 1943, and by September 13, 1944, was serving as a staff sergeant in the 175th Infantry Regiment, 29th Infantry Division. On that day, in Brest, France, he single-handedly attacked and captured a German position, prompting the surrender of other German forces in the area. He was killed in action the next day and, on April 17, 1945, was posthumously awarded the Medal of Honor.

Hallman, aged 30 at his death, was buried at the Brittany American Cemetery in Saint-James, France.

== Medal of Honor citation ==
Staff Sergeant Hallman's official Medal of Honor citation reads:

For conspicuous gallantry and intrepidity at the risk of his life above and beyond the call of duty. On 13 September 1944, in Brittany, France, the 2d Battalion in its attack on the fortified city of Brest was held up by a strongly defended enemy position which had prevented its advance despite repeated attacks extending over 3-days. Finally, Company F advanced to within several hundred yards of the enemy position but was again halted by intense fire. Realizing that the position must be neutralized without delay, S/Sgt. Hallman ordered his squad to cover his movements with fire while he advanced alone to a point from which he could make the assault. Without hesitating, S/Sgt. Hallman leaped over a hedgerow into a sunken road, the central point of the German defenses which was known to contain an enemy machinegun position and at least 30 enemy riflemen. Firing his carbine and hurling grenades, S/Sgt. Hallman, unassisted, killed or wounded 4 of the enemy, then ordered the remainder to surrender. Immediately, 12 of the enemy surrendered and the position was shortly secured by the remainder of his company. Seeing the surrender of this position, about 75 of the enemy in the vicinity surrendered, yielding a defensive organization which the battalion with heavy supporting fires had been unable to take. This single heroic act on the part of S/Sgt. Hallman resulted in the immediate advance of the entire battalion for a distance of 2,000 yards to a position from which Fort Keranroux was captured later the same day. S/Sgt. Hallman's fighting determination and intrepidity in battle exemplify the highest tradition of the U.S. Armed Forces.

== Awards and decorations ==

| Badge | Combat Infantryman Badge | | |
| 1st row | Medal of Honor | | |
| 2nd row | Bronze Star Medal | Purple Heart | Army Good Conduct Medal |
| 3rd row | American Campaign Medal | European–African–Middle Eastern Campaign Medal with 1 campaign star | World War II Victory Medal |

== See also ==
- List of Medal of Honor recipients for World War II
