= Ernest W. Prussman =

United States Army Medal of Honor recipient

- Born: September 15, 1921; Baltimore, Maryland, U.S.
- Died: September 8, 1944 (aged 22) near Loscoat, Brittany, France
- Burial place: Brittany American Cemetery and Memorial, Saint-James, France
- Military career
- Allegiance: United States
- Branch: United States Army
- Service years: 1942–1944
- Rank: Private First Class
- Service number: 31227157
- Units: 13th Infantry Regiment, 8th Infantry Division
- Conflicts: World War II: Battle for Brest †
- Awards: Medal of Honor

Ernest William Prussman (September 15, 1921 – September 8, 1944) was a United States Army soldier and a recipient of the United States military's highest decoration—the Medal of Honor—for his actions in World War II.

== Biography ==
Prussman was born in 1921 in Baltimore, Maryland. He had a twin brother, Earl, and their father's name was Herbert. In June 1938, the twins graduated from the Edison school within the Boston Public Schools system.

Prussman joined the Army in October 1942; he was living on Parsons Street in the Brighton neighborhood of Boston at the time. He was a clerk in a chain store prior to his enlistment. Two of Prussman's brothers also served in the military during the war; Henry in the Army Air Forces and Calvin in the Navy.

Prussman served as a private first class in the 13th Infantry Regiment, 8th Infantry Division. He first saw action in France in July 1944. Two months later, on September 8, during combat near Loscoat (now an industrial district of Brest) in Brittany, Prussman advanced ahead of his unit and single-handedly captured several enemy soldiers and destroyed a machine gun nest before being killed. He was buried at the Brittany American Cemetery and Memorial in Saint-James, Normandy, France.

On April 19, 1945, Prussman was posthumously awarded the Medal of Honor. In a Patriots' Day ceremony in Boston, the award was presented to his mother by General Sherman Miles.

In September 1945, The Boston Globe noted that Prussman was the sole Medal of Honor recipient from Boston during World War II.

== Medal of Honor citation ==
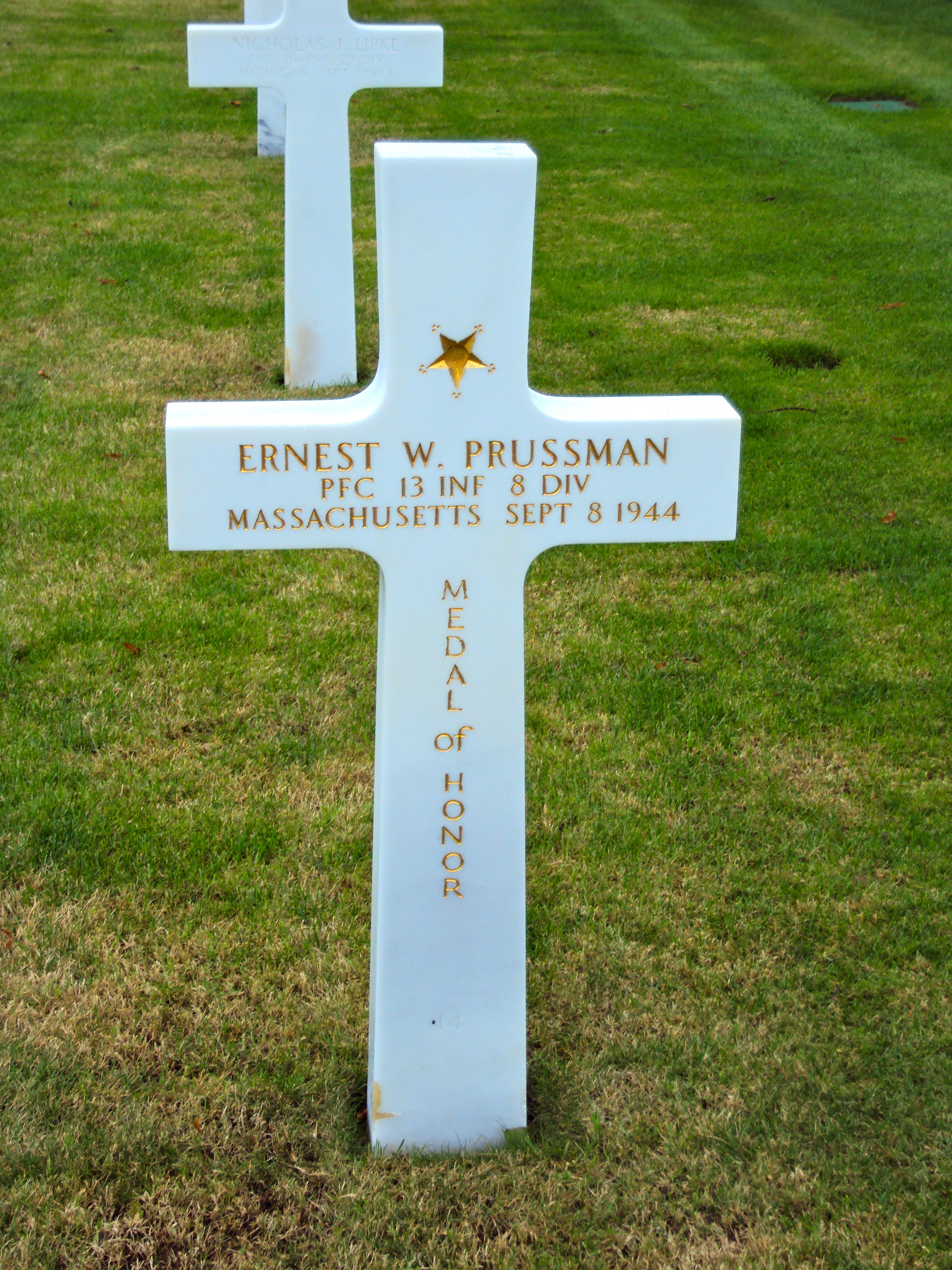
Prussman's headstone in France

Private First Class Prussman's official Medal of Honor citation reads:

For conspicuous gallantry and intrepidity at risk of life above and beyond the call of duty on September 8, 1944, near Les Coates, (Note: Likely an incorrect transcription of Loscoat.) Brittany, France. When the advance of the flank companies of 2 battalions was halted by intense enemy mortar, machinegun, and sniper fire from a fortified position on his left, Pfc. Prussman maneuvered his squad to assault the enemy fortifications. Hurdling a hedgerow, he came upon 2 enemy riflemen whom he disarmed. After leading his squad across an open field to the next hedgerow, he advanced to a machinegun position, destroyed the gun, captured its crew and 2 riflemen. Again advancing ahead of his squad in the assault, he was mortally wounded by an enemy rifleman, but as he fell to the ground he threw a handgrenade, killing his opponent. His superb leadership and heroic action at the cost of his life so demoralized the enemy that resistance at this point collapsed, permitting the 2 battalions to continue their advance.

== Awards and decorations ==

Badge	Combat Infantryman Badge		
1st row	Medal of Honor		
2nd row	Bronze Star Medal Retroactively Awarded, 1947	Purple Heart	Army Good Conduct Medal
3rd row	American Campaign Medal	European–African–Middle Eastern Campaign Medal with 2 Campaign stars	World War II Victory Medal

== Memorials ==
In October 1964, a local American Legion post dedicated the intersection of Goodenough Street and Faneuil Street (Note: 42.355685°N 71.154343°W) in the Brighton neighborhood of Boston in honor of Prussman. In June 1965, the City of Boston officially named it Ernest W. Prussman Square.

In May 1994, a park at Fort Jackson in South Carolina—then home to the 13th Infantry Regiment—was dedicated in Prussman's memory; his brother Calvin attended the dedication ceremony.

A statue of Prussman was dedicated on Memorial Day of 2018 near the intersection of Murdock Street and Cambridge Street in the Brighton neighborhood of Boston. (Note: 42.350176°N 71.147506°W) The Neighborhood Task Force at Boston College provided a grant for the statue. Jeff Buccacio (whose later work includes the statue of Tom Brady at Gillette Stadium) was the sculptor.

== See also ==
- List of Medal of Honor recipients
- List of Medal of Honor recipients for World War II
