= Calvin Waller =

United States Army general (1937–1996)

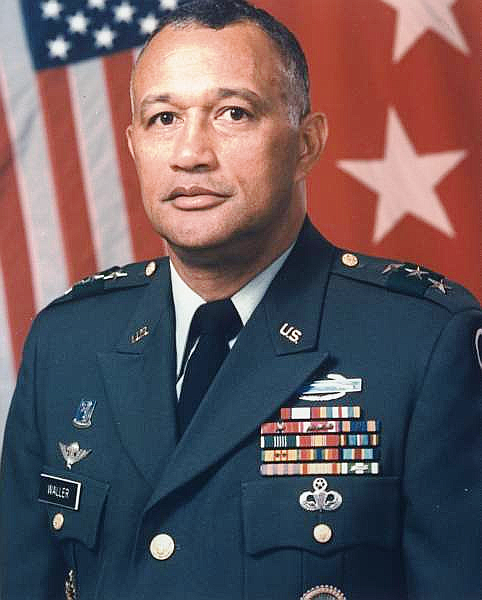
- Born: December 17, 1937; Baton Rouge, Louisiana, U.S.
- Died: May 9, 1996 (aged 58); Washington, D.C., U.S.
- Burial place: Arlington National Cemetery
- Military career
- Allegiance: United States
- Branch: United States Army
- Service years: 1959–1991
- Rank: Lieutenant General
- Commands: I Corps; 8th Infantry Division (Mechanized)
- Conflicts: Vietnam War; Gulf War
- Awards: Defense Distinguished Service Medal; Army Distinguished Service Medal (2); Defense Superior Service Medal; Bronze Star Medal (2)
- Other work: RKK Limited; ICF Kaiser Environmental and Energy

Calvin Augustine Hoffman Waller (December 17, 1937 – May 9, 1996) was a United States Army lieutenant general.

== Early life and education ==
Waller was born to an African American family in Baton Rouge, Louisiana, on December 17, 1937. He graduated from Prairie View A&M University in 1959 with a bachelor's degree and later from Shippensburg College of Pennsylvania with a master's degree in public administration in 1978.

== Military career ==
Waller spent 32 years in the United States Army and served in the Vietnam War. Waller held a variety of staff and command positions which included: chief of staff, 24th Infantry Division (Mechanized), Fort Stewart, Georgia; Commanding General, 8th Infantry Division (Mechanized), V Corps, U.S. Army Europe and Seventh Army.

Waller was the deputy commanding general for military operations with United States Central Command (Forward), during the Persian Gulf War.

Waller's last duty assignment was as Commanding General, I Corps at Fort Lewis, Washington, before he retired from the military at the rank of lieutenant general, on November 30, 1991.

=== Opposition to military service by homosexuals ===
Waller vehemently opposed homosexuals serving openly in the United States Armed Forces. During the 1993 U.S. Senate hearings on allowing homosexuals to serve openly in the United States military, Waller vigorously opposed it. He declared that "to compare [his] service in American's armed forces with the integration of avowed homosexuals is personally offensive."

== Later life and death ==
After retiring from the military, Waller moved to Denver, Colorado, and served as the president and chief executive officer of an environmental technology company, RKK Limited. He then became the senior vice president for the Department of Energy Programs for the ICF Kaiser Environmental and Energy Group. In July 1995, Waller became the Kaiser-Hill vice president for site operations and integration at Rocky Flats Environmental Technology Site.

Waller died in Washington, D.C., on May 9, 1996, at the age of 58, due to complications from a heart attack. He was buried at Arlington National Cemetery, in Arlington, Virginia.

Upon learning of his death, President Bill Clinton said, "His rise from humble beginnings to one of the highest-ranking African American officers in the U.S. military through stalwart determination and a record of excellence served as an inspiration to minority and non-minority officers." Clinton also cited Waller's reputation as a "skillful and disciplined professional and a caring, enthusiastic commander."

== Awards and decorations ==
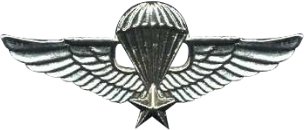
Combat Infantryman Badge
Master Parachutist Badge
Office of the Secretary of Defense Identification Badge
Army Staff Identification Badge
Vietnam Parachutist Badge
77th Armored Regiment Distinctive Unit Insignia

Defense Distinguished Service Medal
Army Distinguished Service Medal with one bronze oak leaf cluster
Defense Superior Service Medal
Bronze Star Medal with one bronze oak leaf cluster
Meritorious Service Medal with three oak leaf clusters
Air Medal
Army Commendation Medal
National Defense Service Medal with one bronze service star
Armed Forces Expeditionary Medal
Vietnam Service Medal with two service stars
Army Service Ribbon
Army Overseas Service Ribbon
Vietnam Armed Forces Honor Medal, 1st class
France Legion of Honour (degree unknown)
Unidentified decoration
Vietnam Campaign Medal

Waller's civic awards include the Martin Luther King Jr. "Buffalo Soldier" Award from the Congress of Racial Equality, the Roy Wilkins Renown Service Award from the NAACP and the "Star of Texas" award from the state of Texas.
