= Loscoat =

Loscoat was, before 1945, a hamlet belonging to the village of Lambézellec(fr), which is now a large suburb of Brest. Part of the former hamlet has now become an industrial area(fr), whereas the rest has become a residential area.

== History ==
As in all other hamlets around Brest, intense fighting between the American infantry forces and the German Wehrmacht took place in Loscoat during the Battle for Brest (7 August – 20 September 1944) of World War II.

Most notably, American soldier Ernest W. Prussman, from the 13th Infantry Regiment, took over his squad on 8 September 1944 during the advance on "Les Coates" (as it appears in his official citation) in Brittany, and disarmed several Germans, including a machine gun crew. Shot by a German rifleman, his dying act was to unleash a hand grenade that killed the man who shot him. Prussman was awarded a Medal of Honor posthumously.

== Sources ==
- "These are My Credentials!": The Story of the 8th Infantry Division, 1798-1944. This document does not explicitly state the name of Loscoat, but it gives a rather accurate location of the 13th Infantry Regiment on 8 September 1944, which helps identify "Les Coates" as Loscoat.
- Lambézellec aujourd'hui(fr), a document in French about the district of Lambézellec and the industrial and residential areas of Loscoat.
