= 62nd Infantry Regiment (United States) =

- Active: 1917–1922; 1942–1943
- Country: United States
- Branch: United States Army
- Type: Infantry
- Size: Regiment
- Engagements: World War I; Russian Civil War; Allied intervention in the Russian Civil War; World War II

The 62nd Infantry Regiment was a Regular Army infantry regiment in the United States Army.

== History ==
=== World War I ===
The 62nd Infantry Regiment was constituted in the Regular Army on 15 May 1917, and was organized on 1 June 1917 at the Presidio of San Francisco, California, from personnel of the 12th Infantry Regiment. It was assigned to the 15th Infantry Brigade, 8th Division, stationed at Camp Fremont, California, on 17 December 1917. The regiment was initially commanded by Colonel James R. Lindsay, who served until October 1918, when he was promoted to brigadier general and assigned to command the 97th Division. The regiment departed Camp Fremont on 18 October 1918 with elements of the 15th Infantry Brigade for movement to Camp Mills, New York and then movement overseas to France. The regiment was at sea when it received news of the armistice that ended the war. The 8th Division was demobilized on 5 September 1919 at Camp Dix, New Jersey.

=== Interwar period ===
The 62nd Infantry was stationed at Camp Lee, Virginia, as of June 1919 as a separate regiment. The regimental officers (cadre only), records, and colors were transferred in February 1921 to Fort Mills, in the Philippine Islands. It was organized on 25 March 1921 as a Philippine Scouts (PS) regiment by consolidation with the personnel and equipment of the 4th Philippine Infantry Regiment (Provisional). The regiment was partially inactivated on 22 September 1921 at Fort Mills by transfer of Philippine Scout personnel to the 2nd Battalion, 14th Engineer Regiment (PS). The 62nd Infantry was fully inactivated on 25 November 1921 at Fort Mills, and demobilized (disbanded) on 31 July 1922.

=== World War II ===
The 62nd Infantry was reconstituted in the Regular Army as the 62nd Armored Infantry Regiment, assigned to the 14th Armored Division on 31 August 1942, and activated on 15 November 1942 at Camp Chaffee, Arkansas. When U.S. armored divisions shifted from having one armored infantry regiment to three separate armored infantry battalions in 1943, the 62nd Armored Infantry was broken up on 20 September 1943 and its elements were reorganized as follows:

- 62nd Armored Infantry (less 1st and 2nd Battalions) as the 62nd Armored Infantry Battalion
- 1st Battalion as the 68th Armored Infantry Battalion
- 2nd Battalion as the 19th Armored Infantry Battalion

=== Cold War ===
19th Armored Infantry Battalion redesignated as the 562nd Armored Infantry Battalion on 25 February 1953. 68th Armored Infantry Battalion redesignated as the 568th Armored Infantry Battalion on 25 February 1953.

== Campaign streamers ==
- Rhineland
- Ardennes-Alsace
- Central Europe

== Coat of arms ==
Blazon

- Shield: Azure, a grizzly bear passant proper.
- Crest: On a wreath, argent and azure, a setting sun.

This regiment was organized at the Presidio of San Francisco in 1917, which is symbolized by the grizzly bear from the flag and seal of California and the setting sun. The shield is blue for infantry.

== See also ==
- Distinctive unit insignia (U.S. Army)
