= 12th Division (United States) =

Former US Army unit

- 12th U.S. Army Division SSI
- Active: July 1918 - January 1919
- Country: United States
- Branch: United States Army
- Role: Infantry
- Size: Division
- Garrison/HQ: Camp Devins, Massachusetts
- Nickname: Plymouth Division

Commanders
- Notable commanders: Major General Henry P. McCain

The 12th Division was an infantry division of the United States Army, active in 1918–1919. Established at Camp Devens, Massachusetts, the division's training was interrupted by the World War I armistice, and the division was later disbanded.

== History ==
The 12th Division was part of a group of six divisions (9th-14th) that the War Department directed to be formed in mid-1918 from troops of the Regular Army augmented by draftees. It was anticipated that the divisions' training would take four months, to be completed by the end of November 1918.

On 9 July 1918, the War Department ordered the organization of the 12th Division at Camp Devens. The division began forming on 12 July. The 36th Infantry and 42d Infantry were ordered to Camp Devens in the latter part of July to become part of the division; the 42nd Infantry had been assigned to the division on 5 July 1918. Cadres of non-commissioned officers and privates was taken from each of the two existing regiments and assigned to the new 73rd Infantry and 74th, both war-raised National Army units consisting mostly of draftees from the Northeastern United States, as a nucleus. The 12th Field Artillery Brigade, which was to become the divisional artillery, was organized and trained at Camp McClellan, Alabama, but never actually joined the division at Camp Devens before its disbandment. It consisted of the 34th, 35th, and 36th Field Artillery Regiments and a trench mortar battery. By 1 September 1918 the training of the division for overseas service was well under way. Only after the Armistice of 11 November 1918 did orders arrive for the demobilization

of the division. By 31 January 1919, all non-Regular commissioned and enlisted personnel had been discharged. Major General Henry P. McCain commanded this division from the time of its organization until it was demobilized. Interim commanders included George L. Byroade, Almon L. Parmerter, and John E. Woodward. McCain remained in command of Camp Devens after the division was disestablished.

== Organization ==
- 23rd Infantry Brigade
  - 35th Infantry Regiment
  - 43rd Infantry Regiment
  - 35th Machine Gun Battalion
- 24th Infantry Brigade
  - 42d Infantry Regiment
  - 74th Infantry Regiment
  - 36th Machine Gun Battalion
- 12th Field Artillery Brigade
  - 34th Field Artillery Regiment
  - 35th Field Artillery Regiment
  - 36th Field Artillery Regiment
- Headquarters
  - 34th Machine Gun Battalion
  - 212th Engineers
  - 212th Field Signal Battalion
  - Division Trains

== Post World War II ==
From 1946 to 1947 the Philippine Division was re-designated the 12th Infantry Division.
