= James R. Lindsay =

U.S. Army brigadier general

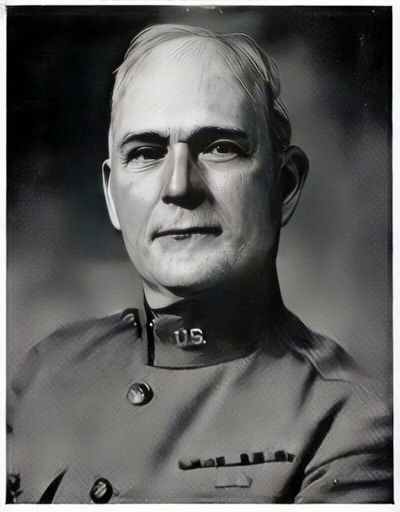
- From 1940's Seventy-first Annual Report of the Association of Graduates of the United States Military Academy
- Born: August 12, 1865; Olney, Illinois, U.S.
- Died: April 25, 1940 (aged 74); Louisville, Kentucky, U.S.
- Burial place: Arlington National Cemetery
- Alma mater: United States Military Academy; United States Army Command and General Staff College
- Spouse: Eva Miller (m. 1898–1940)
- Children: 2
- Military career
- Service: United States Army; Organized Reserve Corps
- Service years: 1890–1921 (Army); 1921–1932 (Reserve)
- Rank: Brigadier General
- Service number: 0-13498
- Unit: U.S. Army Infantry Branch
- Commands: U.S. Army Detachment Pozorrubio; Company H, 13th Infantry Regiment; Casual Company, Fort McDowell; 1st Battalion, 13th Infantry; Company L, 13th Infantry; 3rd Battalion, 13th Infantry; 62nd Infantry Regiment; 15th Infantry Brigade, 8th Division; 97th Division; Camp Cody, New Mexico; 42nd Infantry Regiment; Springfield, Massachusetts Recruiting District
- Wars: Spanish–American War; Philippine–American War; United States occupation of Veracruz; World War I
- Other work: Professor of Military Science and Tactics, Louisville Male High School

James Robert Lindsay (August 12, 1865 – April 25, 1940) was a career officer in the United States Army. An 1890 graduate of the United States Military Academy, he was a veteran of the Spanish–American War, Philippine–American War, United States occupation of Veracruz, and World War I. During the First World War, Lindsay was promoted to brigadier general as commander of the 97th Division at Camp Cody, New Mexico. After the war, he was commissioned as a brigadier general in the Organized Reserve Corps and served as Professor of Military Science and Tactics at Kentucky's Louisville Male High School.

== Early life ==
James R. Lindsay was born in Olney, Illinois on August 12, 1865, a son of Milton C. Lindsay (1839–1870) and Melissa Ann (Springer) Lindsay Berninger (1839–1928). He was raised and educated in Richland County, Illinois and received his certification as a school teacher.

Lindsay was a teacher and principal for several years, including at schools in Claremont and Calhoun, and in 1886 he received an appointment to the United States Military Academy from U.S. Representative Silas Z. Landes. He graduated in 1890 ranked 16th of 54 and received his commission as a second lieutenant of Infantry.

== Start of career ==
From October 1890 to April 1894, Lindsay served with the 14th Infantry Regiment at Vancouver Barracks, Washington, including detached service as recruiting officer at Port Townsend, Washington from June to August 1891. From April 1894 to July 1895 he served as regimental recruiting officer in Portland, Oregon. From September 1895 to June 1897 he was posted to Fort Leavenworth, Kansas, including attendance at the Infantry and Cavalry School (now the United States Army Command and General Staff College. In February 1897, Lindsay was promoted to first lieutenant in the 8th Infantry Regiment.

Lindsay served with the 8th Infantry at Fort D. A. Russell, Wyoming from September 1897 to April 1898. During the Spanish–American War, he served with his regiment at Chickamauga Park, Georgia from April to June 1898, and in May he was appointed regimental quartermaster. He organized the regiment's transportation to Tampa, Florida, then its departure to Cuba. He took part in combat with the 8th Infantry, including the Siege of Santiago, and was appointed quartermaster of 1st Brigade, 2nd Division, Fifth Army Corps. He moved to Camp Wickoff, New York with the Fifth Corps in August 1898, when it was evacuated from Cuba following a malaria outbreak.

In December 1898, Lindsay traveled to Huntsville, Alabama, where he joined the 8th Infantry as it prepared for service in Cuba. He arrived in Cuba in mid-December, and he served until June 1899. After returning to the United States, Lindsay performed recruiting duty at Columbus Barracks, Ohio until November 1899. In October 1899, he was promoted to captain in the 13th Infantry.

== Continued career ==
Lindsay performed duty training Philippine–American War recruits at Fort Slocum, New York. In March 1900, he traveled to the Philippines aboard U.S. Army Transport Sumner. He joined the 8th Infantry at Dagupan in June, but became ill soon afterward. He remained hospitalized in the Philippines until September, then traveled to the United States for convalescent leave. In December 1900, he performed temporary duty at Fort Leavenworth, and later that month he was assigned to recruiting duty in Little Rock, Arkansas. In November 1901 he rejoined the 13th Infantry in the Philippines, and was assigned to command the base at Pozorrubio.

In January 1902, Lindsay was posted to Fort Alcatraz, California, where he commanded Company H, 13 Infantry. In July 1902, he was assigned as regimental quartermaster with duty at Fort McDowell, California. As quartermaster, Lindsay supervised construction and repairs at the fort, in addition to commanding its Casual Company from September 1903 to February 1904.

In October 1905, Lindsay was transferred from regimental quartermaster to regimental adjutant. He traveled to the Philippines aboard USAT Thomas, where he served at Fort William McKinley until September 1907. He was relieved as regimental adjutant in March 1907, and performed detached service as the post adjutant until August 1907. Lindsay commander 1st Battalion, 13th Infantry from August to September 1907, and Company L and 3rd Battalion beginning in September 1907. He returned to the United States in October 1907, and was stationed at Fort Leavenworth.

In March 1911, Lindsay was promoted to major in the 28th Infantry Regiment, and he served as quartermaster of the Fort Leavenworth post from June to August 1911. He served with the 28th Infantry at Fort Sam Houston, Texas from August to November 1911, and at Fort Snelling, Minnesota from November 1911 to January 1913. Lindsay served in Galveston, Texas from January 1913 to January 1914, when he was posted to Fort Leavenworth, where he was a student at the Army School of the Line's Field Officers' Course. From April to November 1914, Lindsay served with his regiment in Mexico during United States occupation of Veracruz. After his service in Mexico, Lindsay returned to Galveston, where he remained until August 1915.

== Later career ==
In September 1915, Lindsay was transferred to the 15th Infantry Regiment, which was stationed at Regan Barracks near Legazpi, Albay in the Philippines until October 1916, and he was promoted to lieutenant colonel in July 1916. He served with the 15th Infantry at Tianjin, China from November 1916 until May 1917. Upon returning to the United States, Lindsay was assigned to command the 62nd Infantry Regiment at the Presidio of San Francisco. He was promoted to temporary colonel in August 1917, and led his regiment during its World War I training at Camp Fremont, California. The 62nd Infantry was part of the 15th Infantry Brigade, a unit of the 8th Division, and as senior regimental commander, Lindsay acted as commanded of the 15th Brigade on several occasions. Lindsay was promoted to permanent colonel in January 1918.

In October 1918, Lindsay was promoted to temporary brigadier general and assigned to command the 97th Division and the post at Camp Cody, New Mexico. The Armistice of November 11, 1918 ended the war before the 97th Division was scheduled to depart for combat in France, and Lindsay remained in command until the division was inactivated in January 1919. He returned to his permanent grade of colonel in February 1919.

In March 1919, Lindsay was assigned to Camp Upton, New York, where he commanded the 42nd Infantry Regiment. When the regiment's subordinate units were assigned to other posts in early 1920, Lindsay was assigned to command the Springfield, Massachusetts Recruiting District. Lindsay retired in October 1920, but remained in active service to perform recruiting duties. In April 1921, he and two other officers were assigned to Johns Hopkins University, where they pursued study of methods for training Reserve Officers' Training Corps students.

== Retirement and death ==
In June 1921, Lindsay retired again and moved to Louisville, Kentucky, where he became Professor of Military Science and Tactics at the Louisville Male High School. In December 1921, he was commissioned as a brigadier general in the Organized Reserve Corps. In June 1930, the U.S. Congress enacted legislation permitting the general officers of World War I to retire at their highest rank, and Lindsay was promoted to brigadier general on the army's retired list.

Lindsay retired from the military and his teaching position in 1932, and continued to reside in Louisville. He died in Louisville on April 25, 1940. Lindsay was buried at Arlington National Cemetery.

== Family ==
In August 1898, Lindsay married Eva Miller of Leavenworth, Kansas. They were the parents of two sons, John R. Lindsay Jr. (1899–1945) and Gregg M. Lindsay (1901–1934), both of whom served in the army.
