= Joe Hastings =

Joe Hastings may refer to:

- Joe R. Hastings (1925–1945), United States Army soldier and Medal of Honor recipient
- Joe Hastings (American football) (born 1987), American football wide receiver
