= Calhoun, Illinois =

Calhoun
- Village
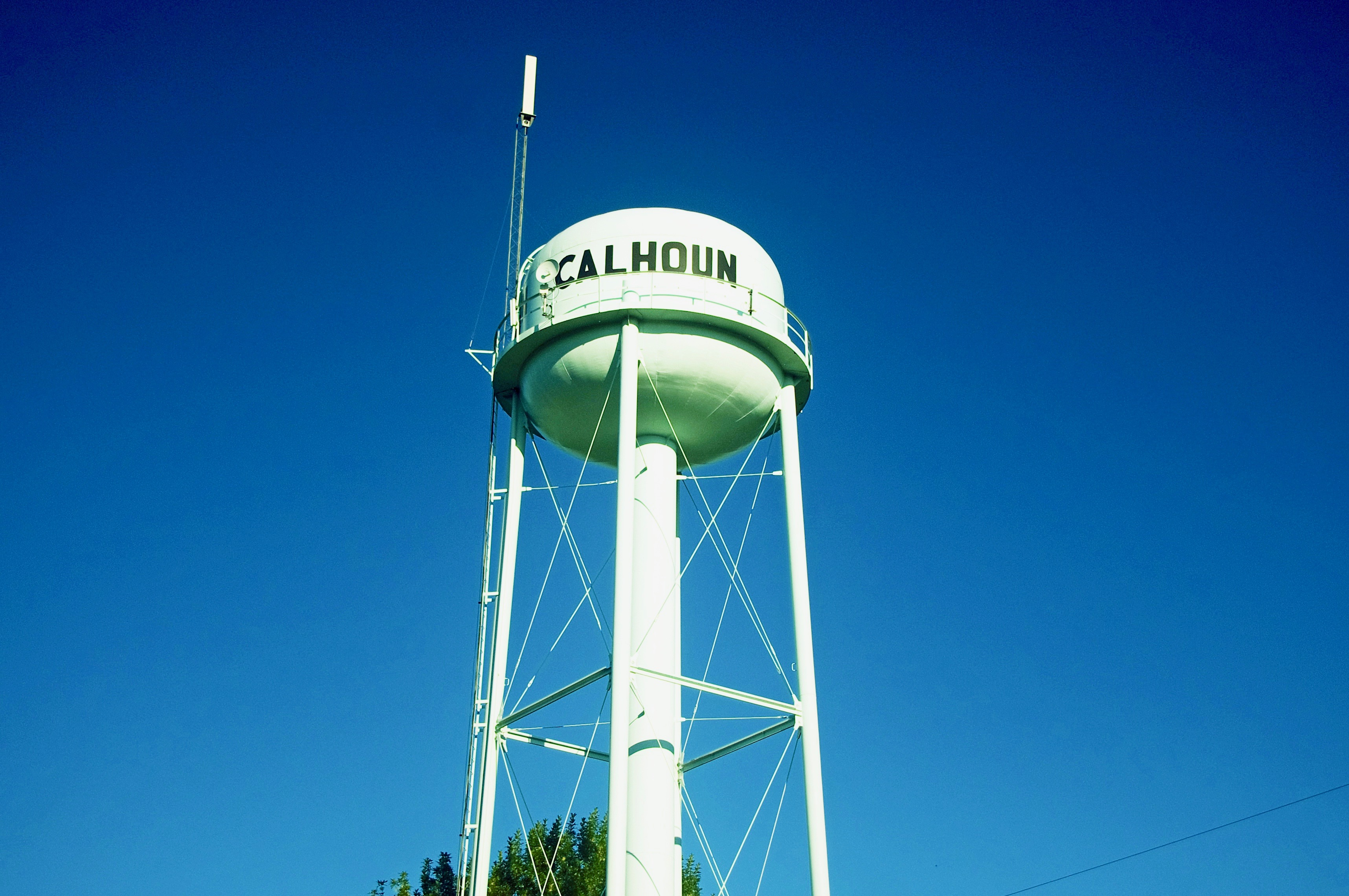
- Water tower

- Location of Calhoun in Richland County, Illinois.
- Coordinates: 38°39′04″N 88°02′38″W
- Country: United States
- State: Illinois
- County: Richland

Area
  - Total: 0.91 sq mi (2.36 km^{2})
  - Land: 0.91 sq mi (2.36 km^{2})
  - Water: 0 sq mi (0.00 km^{2})
- Elevation: 541 ft (165 m)

Population (2020)
  - Total: 164
  - Density: 179.8/sq mi (69.42/km^{2})
- Time zone: UTC-6 (CST)
  - Summer (DST): UTC-5 (CDT)
- ZIP code: 62419
- Area code: 618
- FIPS code: 17–10448
- GNIS feature ID: 2397531

Calhoun is a village in Richland County, Illinois, United States. As of the 2020 census, Calhoun had a population of 164.

== History ==
The community of Fairview, now Calhoun, is one of the oldest communities in Richland County. While it was not officially organized under village government, the community of that name was known in the early 1830s. It was originally platted into lots by Shadrach Ruark. Reverend Ruark was an early Methodist who performed the first wedding in Richland County on October 20, 1841, when Ebeneezer Waker and Abigail Reed were united. The original plat was lost and it was replatted in 1848. When the post office was established, it took the name Calhoun, after Hugh Calhoun, the original settler of what was known as Calhoun Prairie.

Calhoun School was built in 1912 and was only one story. The upper floor was added in 1920 when a two-year high school was added. In 1922, it became a three-year high school. The high school used two classrooms in the basement in addition to the upper floor. Grades 1 through 8 were taught on the first floor. Calhoun had one of the first three-year high schools in Richland County.

== Geography ==
Calhoun lies just east of Illinois State Route 130, southeast of Olney.

According to the 2010 census, Calhoun has a total area of 1.06 square miles (2.75 km^{2}), all land.

== Demographics ==
Historical population
Census	Pop.	Note	%±
1920	230		—
1930	183		−20.4%
1940	197		7.7%
1950	215		9.1%
1960	188		−12.6%
1970	238		26.6%
1980	267		12.2%
1990	232		−13.1%
2000	222		−4.3%
2010	172		−22.5%
2020	164		−4.7%
U.S. Decennial Census

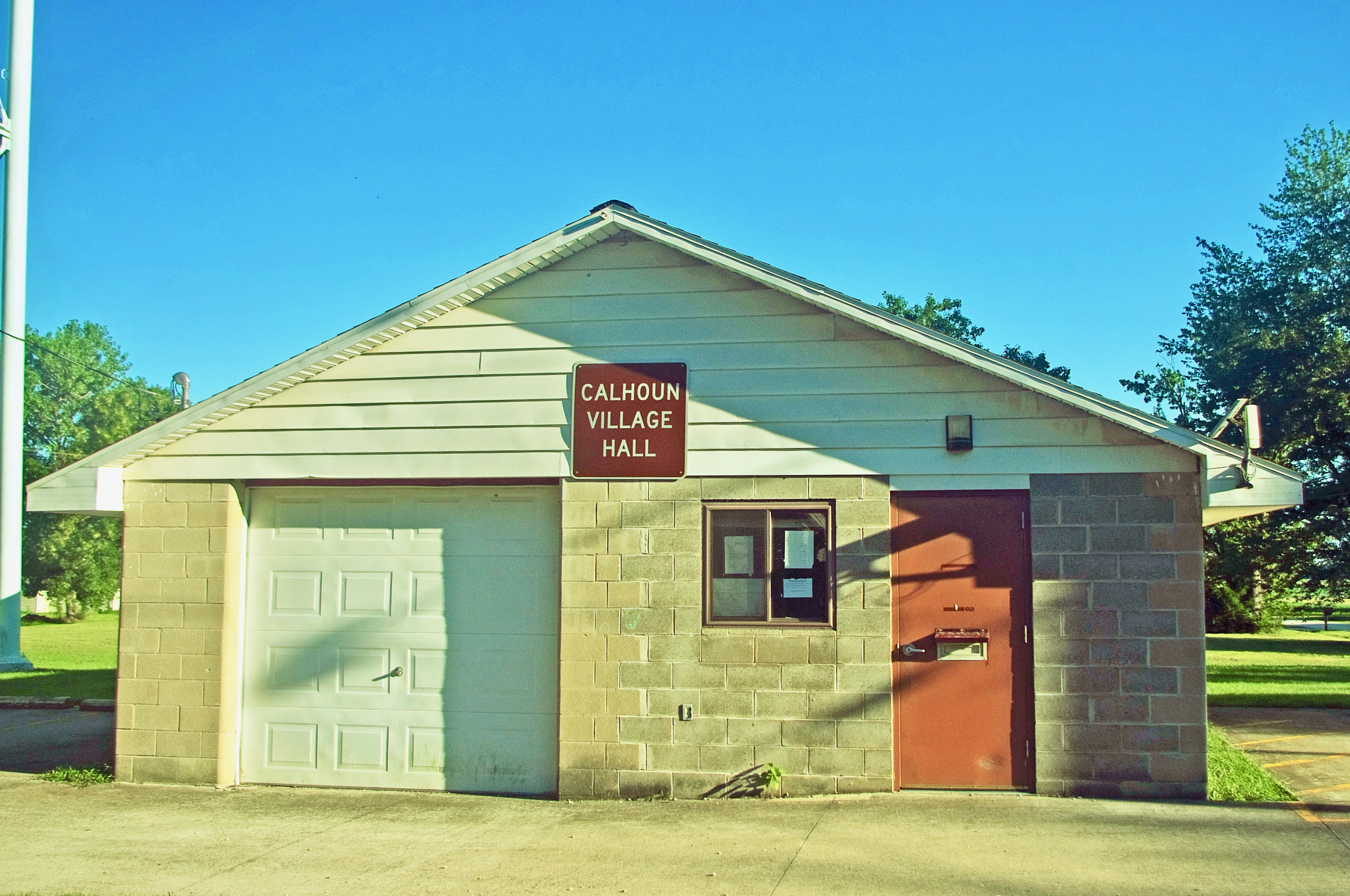
Calhoun Village Hall

As of the census of 2000, there were 222 people, 86 households, and 65 families residing in the village. The population density was 211.9 inhabitants per square mile (81.8/km^{2}). There were 93 housing units at an average density of 88.8 units per square mile (34.3 units/km^{2}). The racial makeup of the village was 94.14% White, 1.35% Native American, 3.60% Asian, and 0.90% from two or more races.

There were 86 households, out of which 39.5% had children under the age of 18 living with them, 53.5% were married couples living together, 15.1% had a female householder with no husband present, and 24.4% were non-families. 18.6% of all households were made up of individuals, and 11.6% had someone living alone who was 65 years of age or older. The average household size was 2.58 and the average family size was 2.94.

In the village, the population was spread out, with 31.1% under the age of 18, 8.6% from 18 to 24, 27.5% from 25 to 44, 19.4% from 45 to 64, and 13.5% who were 65 years of age or older. The median age was 34 years. For every 100 females, there were 89.7 males. For every 100 females age 18 and over, there were 86.6 males.

The median income for a household in the village was $25,809, and the median income for a family was $27,500. Males had a median income of $25,000 versus $19,375 for females. The per capita income for the village was $14,679. About 20.0% of families and 27.2% of the population were below the poverty line, including 41.9% of those under the age of eighteen and 6.7% of those 65 or over.

== Notable people ==
- James R. Lindsay, U.S. Army brigadier general; raised in Calhoun.
