= Herman F. Kramer =

U.S. Army major general

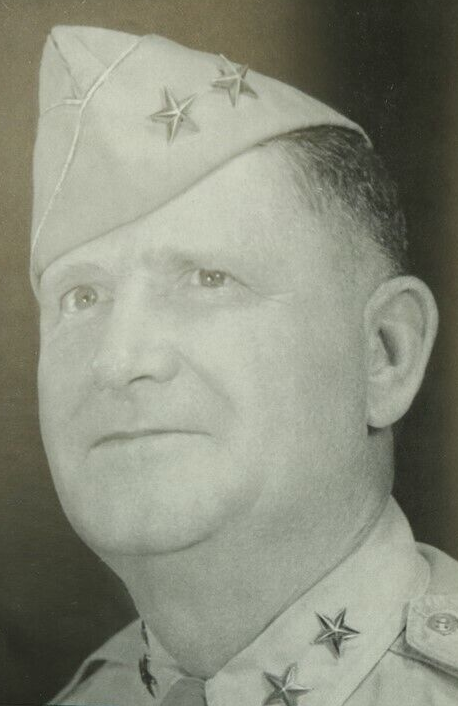
- Frontispiece of 1947's The Black Panther: 66th Division
- Born: November 27, 1892; Lincoln, Nebraska, U.S.
- Died: October 20, 1964 (aged 71); Fort Sam Houston, Texas, U.S.
- Burial place: Arlington National Cemetery
- Education: University of Nebraska
- Spouse: Frances Isabel (Pratt) Kramer (m. 1917–1964)
- Children: 1
- Military career
- Allegiance: Nebraska; United States
- Service: Nebraska National Guard; United States Army
- Service years: 1910–1917 (National Guard); 1917–1946 (Army)
- Rank: Major General
- Service number: O–4904
- Unit: Infantry Branch
- Commands: 66th Infantry Division; Twelfth Army Group Coastal Sector; Military Governor of Koblenz; 97th Infantry Division; 86th Infantry Division
- Wars: Pancho Villa Expedition; World War I World War II; Allied-occupied Germany; Occupation of Japan
- Awards: Army Distinguished Service Medal; Legion of Merit; Bronze Star Medal; Legion of Honor (France); Croix de Guerre with palm (France)
- Other work: Field Supervisor, Government Personnel Mutual Life Insurance Company; Board of Directors, San Antonio River Authority

Herman F. Kramer (November 27, 1892 – October 20, 1964) was a career officer in the United States Army. A veteran of the Pancho Villa Expedition, World War I, World War II, Allied-occupied Germany, and Occupation of Japan, he attained the rank of major general and was most notable for his Second World War command of the 66th Infantry Division, 97th Infantry Division, and 86th Infantry Division. He was a recipient of the Army Distinguished Service Medal, Legion of Merit, and Bronze Star Medal, as well as the French Legion of Honor and Croix de Guerre with palm.

A native of Lincoln, Nebraska and the son of a German immigrant father, Kramer graduated from Lincoln High School in 1909 and the University of Nebraska in 1914. While in college, he participated in the school's corps of cadets, which he commanded with the rank of student colonel. He began serving in the Nebraska National Guard's 5th Infantry Regiment in 1910, and received his commission as a second lieutenant in 1912. He served as a captain from 1914 to 1916, and during the Pancho Villa Expedition he held the rank of first lieutenant while serving on the U.S.–Mexico border.

In March 1917, Kramer was commissioned in the U.S. Army as a second lieutenant of Infantry. He was promoted to first lieutenant and captain during World War I, and served with the 40th Infantry Regiment during its organization and training at Fort Snelling, Minnesota. After the war, Kramer continued to serve in positions of increasing rank and responsibility, and received promotion to major in 1929 and lieutenant colonel in 1939. He was a 1933 graduate of the United States Army Command and General Staff College, and from 1937 to 1939 was a student at the German General Staff School, one of a handful of U.S. officers who were able to participate in an exchange program before it ended at the start of World War II.

During the Second World War, he was promoted to colonel in 1941, brigadier general in 1942, and major general in 1943. After combat in Europe as commander of the 66th Infantry Division and 97th Infantry Division, he led the 97th Division to the Pacific theater in the summer of 1945 to take part in the planned invasion of Japan. The Japanese surrender in September ended the need for an invasion, so the 97th Division performed occupation duty beginning later that month. Kramer briefly commanded the 86th Infantry Division in the Philippines during mid-1946, and retired at the end of 1946.

In retirement, Kramer resided in San Antonio, Texas, where he worked as field supervisor for the Government Personnel Mutual Life Insurance Company and was a member of the San Antonio River Authority board of directors. He died at Fort Sam Houston's Brooke Army Medical Center on October 20, 1964. He was buried at Arlington National Cemetery.

== Early life ==
Herman Frederick Kramer was born in Lincoln, Nebraska on November 27, 1892, a son of German immigrant Franz (Frank) Kramer and Sophia (Rodenspiel) Kramer, a first generation American whose parents were from Germany. Kramer grew up speaking and reading German and English. He attended the public schools of Lincoln and graduated from Lincoln High School in 1909.

In July 1910, Kramer enlisted as a private in the Nebraska National Guard's 5th Infantry Regiment. He was promoted to sergeant the following October, and in December 1912 he received his commission as a second lieutenant. In August 1914, he was promoted to captain as the regiment's inspector of small arms practice.

After high school, Kramer attended the University of Nebraska. At college, he was a member of the Alpha Sigma Phi fraternity and the Pershing Rifles. The university maintained a corps of cadets, which Kramer commanded with the rank of student colonel. He was also president of the cadet officers' club. Kramer graduated in 1914 with a Bachelor of Science degree in mechanical engineering. After graduation, Kramer continued to serve in the National Guard while working as a partner in his father's construction company. His professional memberships included the American Society of Mechanical Engineers.

== Start of career ==
In June 1916, Kramer accepted reduction in rank to first lieutenant and reassignment from his inspector's position to serve with his regiment on federal active duty during the Pancho Villa Expedition. He served with the 5th Nebraska Infantry at Camp Llano Grande near Mercedes, Texas while the unit performed security patrols along the Mexico–U.S. border. The regiment returned to Nebraska in February 1917 and was discharged from active duty.

With the army expanding in anticipation of U.S. entry into World War I, in March 1917, Kramer received a commission as a second lieutenant of Infantry in the Regular Army, and was assigned to the 40th Infantry Regiment at Fort Snelling, Minnesota. During the war, he also underwent training at posts including Fort Leavenworth and Fort Riley in Kansas. Kramer was promoted to first lieutenant in the Regular Army on April 15, 1917, temporary captain in the National Army on August 5, 1917, and permanent captain in the Regular Army on December 15, 1917.

== Continued career ==
After the war, Kramer served with the 14th Infantry Regiment at Fort Davis, Panama. In July 1923, he returned to the United States and was assigned to the staff of the 83rd Infantry Division at Fort Hayes, Ohio, which he assisted with its organization and training after it was activated as a unit of the Organized Reserve Corps. Kramer graduated from the Infantry Officer Advanced Course in 1927 and was assigned as assistant professor of military science for the Reserve Officers' Training Corps program at the University of Illinois Urbana-Champaign. He was promoted to major in December 1929. In 1931, he began attendance at the United States Army Command and General Staff College, from which he graduated in 1933. After graduation, Kramer was assigned to the staff college faculty.

In March 1937, Kramer was assigned to the 29th Infantry Regiment at Fort Sill, Oklahoma. In May 1937, Kramer was one of a small group of German-speaking officers, including Albert Coady Wedemeyer, who were selected for an exchange program that included attendance at the German General Staff School in Berlin and service with a German military unit. After completing the academic course, Kramer served with an Infantry regiment, and was a firsthand observer of Germany's 1938 invasion of Czechoslovakia and 1939 Invasion of Poland. He was promoted to lieutenant colonel in June 1939. The start of World War II ended the exchange program, and Kramer returned to the United States in late 1939. In early 1940, he used his exchange program experiences to provide civilian journalists and U.S. intelligence officials current information about Germany's military capability and capacity.

After duty at Fort Benning, Georgia, in August 1941 Kramer was assigned to staff duty in the office of the Chief of Staff of the United States Army. He was promoted to colonel (Army of the United States) the following October. He was promoted to brigadier general (Army of the United States) in July 1942, and in August he was assigned as assistant division commander of the 104th Infantry Division at Camp Adair, Oregon.

== Later career ==
In March 1943, Kramer was promoted to Major General (Army of the United States) and in April he was assigned to command the 66th Infantry Division, which he led at Camp Blanding, Florida, Camp Robinson, Arkansas, Camp Rucker, Alabama, and in England. In December 1944, the 66th Division was en route to France aboard the transports SS Léopoldville and HMS Cheshire. The ships were five miles from Cherbourg when Léopoldville was torpedoed by a German U-boat; 56 crewmembers died, while the 66th Division sustained losses of 14 officers and 748 soldiers.

After reorganizing in Cherbourg, the 66th Division relieved the 94th Infantry Division, which had been patrolling the coast in the Lorient and Saint-Nazaire sectors of Brittany and maintaining a defensive perimeter around the German submarine base pockets of resistance that remained after the Operation Overlord invasion. During this duty, the division patrolled a 112-mile front and carried out artillery attacks on the remaining German pockets, and was credited with disabling several German guns and sinking numerous re-supply boats. Because U.S. troops coordinated activities with French units in the area, Kramer simultaneously commanded all Allied forces in the region as head of the Twelfth Army Group Coastal Sector. After Germany's unconditional surrender on May 8, 1945, German and American officers met near Étel to arrange a truce so they could negotiate surrender terms for the German forces holding out in Lorient. On May 10, a ceremony took place near Caudan, during which Kramer accepted the surrender of General Wilhelm Fahrmbacher's 50,000 troops, along with weapons, vehicles, and other equipment. After Germany's surrender, the 66th Division moved to Koblenz for occupation duty and to guard German prisoner of war camps, and Kramer was assigned as military governor.

In September 1945, Kramer was assigned to command the 97th Infantry Division, which had left Europe after Germany's surrender and departed the U.S. for the Pacific theater expecting to participate in the planned invasion of Japan. The Surrender of Japan on September 2 ended the need for an invasion, so after arriving in Japan in late September, the division was headquartered in Kumagaya while it performed occupation duty of six prefectures. During this duty, soldiers under Kramer's command uncovered plans for a "last stand" by Japanese troops who planned to operate from the mountains near Maebashi, and had amassed equipment including 250 remote controlled mini tanks. The 97th Division returned to the United States in February 1946 and was inactivated in March.

After the 97th Division's inactivation, Kramer was assigned to command the 86th Infantry Division, which was assigned to post-war duties in the Philippines. The division fought Japanese soldiers who had not surrendered, as well as the Hukbalahap insurgency that opposed the Philippines government. Kramer left command in July and was retired for disability on December 31, 1946. His contempt for his enemies generated headlines; when Fahrmbacher presented his pistol while surrendering the forces under his command, Kramer opted not to return it, as the victorious commander usually did. Instead, he kept it, and casually tossed it onto the seat of his Jeep with the disdainful remark that at best it was a "class B" firearm. In a January 1947 speech to a Little Rock, Arkansas civic club, he described the Japanese people as "dirty" and "always hungry" while predicting they would not experience a post-war recovery unless they expanded their farm and industrial production beyond just growing rice.

== Retirement and death ==
After retiring from the military, Kramer was a resident of San Antonio, Texas, where he pursued a ten-year career as a field supervisor for the Government Personnel Mutual Life Insurance Company. He was also a longtime member of the San Antonio River Authority board of directors. He died at Brooke Army Medical Center on the Fort Sam Houston army post on October 20, 1964. He was buried at Arlington National Cemetery.

== Family ==
In April 1917, Kramer married Frances Isabel Pratt of Lincoln, whom he had known since college. They remained married until his death and were the parents of a daughter, Betty Frances Kramer. Betty Kramer was the wife of army officer James M. Hall.

== Awards ==
Kramer's wartime accomplishments were recognized with award of the Army Distinguished Service Medal, Legion of Merit, and Bronze Star Medal with oak leaf cluster. In addition, he was a recipient of the French Legion of Honor and Croix de Guerre with palm.

== Effective dates of promotion ==
The effective dates of Kramer's promotions were:

- Private (National Guard), July 27, 1910
- Sergeant (National Guard), October 20, 1910
- Second Lieutenant (National Guard), December 30, 1912
- Captain (National Guard), August 25, 1914
- First Lieutenant (National Guard), July 1916
- Second Lieutenant (Regular Army), March 21, 1917
- First Lieutenant (Regular Army), April 15, 1917
- Captain (National Army), August 5, 1917
- Captain (Regular Army), December 15, 1917
- Major (Regular Army), December 13, 1929
- Lieutenant Colonel (Regular Army), June 12, 1939
- Colonel (Army of the United States), October 14, 1941
- Brigadier General (Army of the United States), July 26, 1942
- Major General (Army of the United States), March 17, 1943
- Major General (Retired), December 31, 1946
