= 42nd Infantry Regiment (United States) =

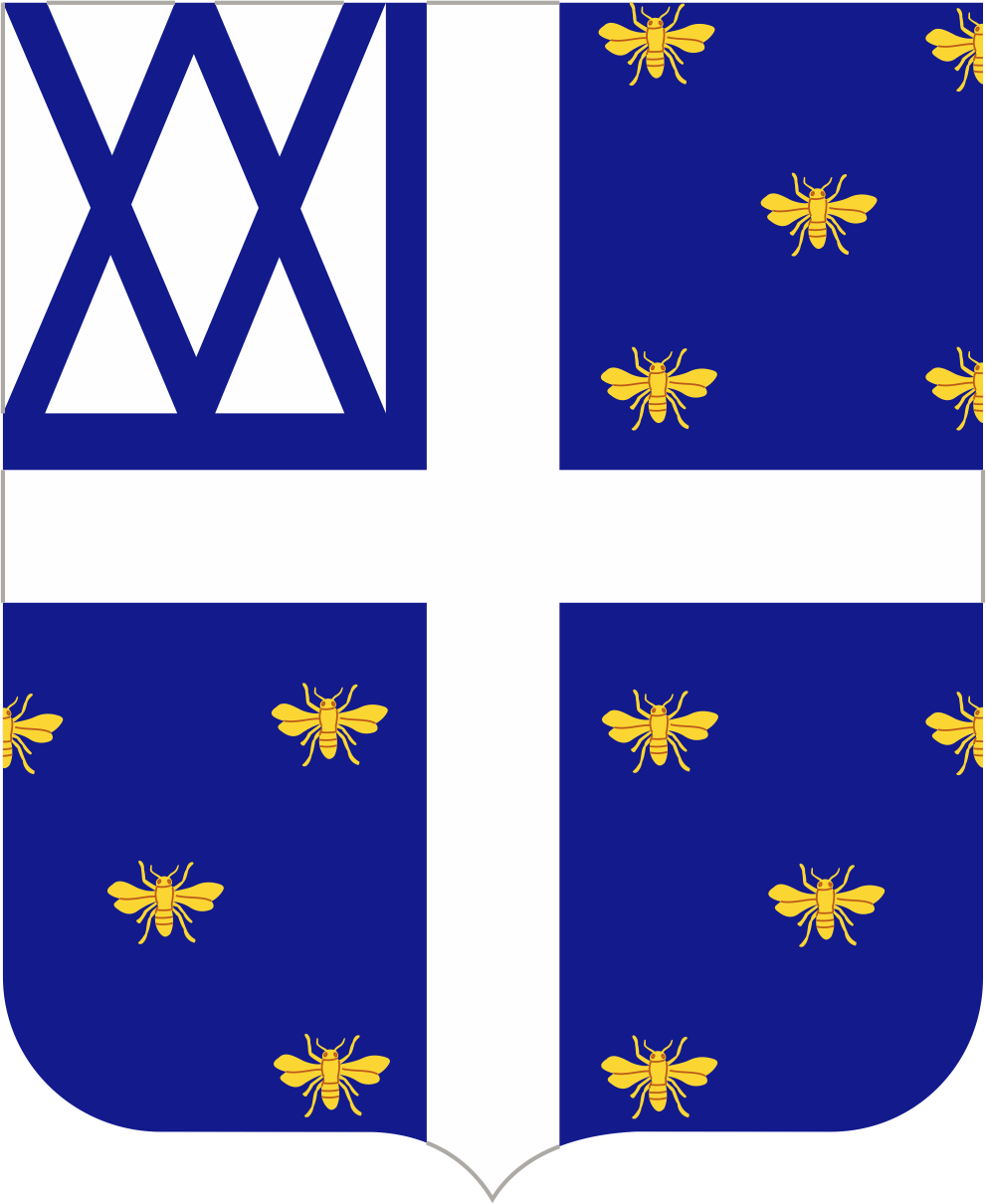
- Coat of arms
- Active: 1917-1944
- Country: United States
- Branch: United States Army
- Type: Infantry
- Size: Regiment
- Motto: none
- Colors: blue

Insignia
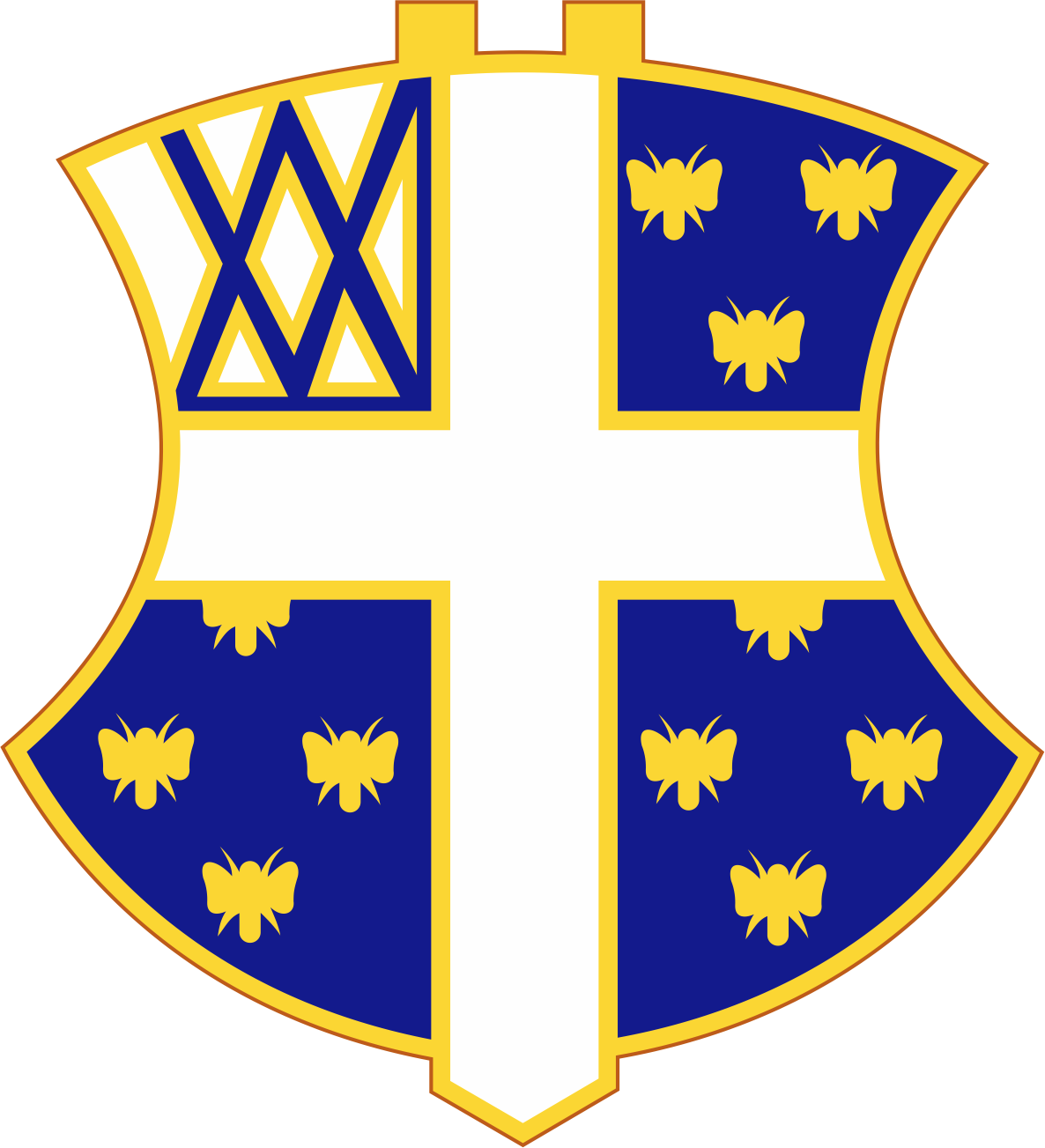
- Distinctive unit insignia

The 42nd Infantry Regiment is an inactive infantry regiment in the United States Army.

== History ==
=== World War I ===
The regiment was constituted on 15 May 1917 in the Regular Army as the 42nd Infantry, organized on 24 June 1917 at Fort Douglas, Utah from personnel of the 20th Infantry Regiment, and assigned to the 12th Division on 5 July 1918. The regiment was subsequently assigned to Camp Mills, New York. When the Armistice of November 11, 1918 ended World War I, the regiment was no longer needed for combat in France, and it was relieved from assignment to the 12th Division on 31 January 1919. Colonel James R. Lindsay commanded the regiment beginning in March 1919, and its subordinate units were subsequently posted to other bases and camps.

=== Interwar period ===
The 42nd Infantry was stationed at Camp Upton, New York, as of June 1919 as a separate regiment. The regimental officers, records, and colors were transferred to San Juan, Puerto Rico, in late 1919 and the regiment was filled with Puerto Rican recruits and enlisted personnel transferred from the 65th Infantry Regiment. Transferred 10 December 1920 to Camp Gaillard, Canal Zone, and assigned to the Panama Canal Division on 3 July 1921. The regiment's primary wartime mission was to conduct a mobile defense of the beaches and inland sectors of the Pacific side of the Canal Zone. Enlisted personnel of the regiment were rotated on 4-year tours with personnel of the 65th Infantry in Puerto Rico. The 42nd Infantry was inactivated, less the 3rd Battalion, at Camp Gaillard from 14 March–30 April 1927, and allotted to the Second Corps Area. The 3rd Battalion was transferred on 31 July 1927 to San Juan and inactivated, with personnel concurrently transferred to the 65th Infantry. The 42nd Infantry was relieved from the Panama Canal Division in 1928, however, the regiment’s mobilization mission continued to be the reinforcement of the Canal Zone. The regiment was affiliated with the University of Puerto Rico ROTC and organized on 28 May 1929 at Rio Piedras as a "Regular Army Inactive" (RAI) unit with Regular Army personnel assigned to the ROTC detachment and Organized Reserve officers commissioned from the program. Regimental units were relocated on 30 September 1937 as follows: regimental headquarters and 1st Battalion at San Juan; 2nd Battalion at Caguas; and 3rd Battalion at Isabela. The regiment conducted summer training most years at Camp Buchanan, and some years at San Juan. It also conducted infantry Citizens Military Training Camps some years at Camp Buchanan as an alternate form of summer training. Disbanded 11 November 1944.

== Distinctive unit insignia ==
- Description

A Gold color metal and enamel device 1 1/4 inches (3.2 cm) in height consisting of a shield blazoned: Azure, semé of bees Or, a cross Argent, on a canton of the last two saltires of the field.

- Symbolism

The shield is blue for Infantry. The Regiment was organized at Fort Douglas, Utah, in May 1917, from the 20th Infantry which is shown on the canton. The bees are taken from the arms of Utah. The Regiment is now recruited from Puerto Rico shown by the cross taken from the old banner of the island.

- Background

The distinctive unit insignia was approved on 14 November 1923. It was rescinded/cancelled on 28 January 1959.

== Coat of arms ==
- Blazon
- Shield

Azure, semé of bees Or, a cross Argent, on a canton of the last two saltires of the field.

  - Crest- None
  - Motto- None
- Symbolism
  - Shield- The shield is blue for Infantry. The Regiment was organized at Fort Douglas, Utah, in May 1917, from the 20th Infantry which is shown on the canton. The bees are taken from the arms of Utah. The Regiment is now recruited from Puerto Rico shown by the cross taken from the old banner of the island.
  - Crest- None.
- Background- The coat of arms was approved on 4 June 1921. It was rescinded/cancelled on 28 January 1959.

== See also ==
- Distinctive unit insignia
