= 74th Infantry Regiment (United States) =

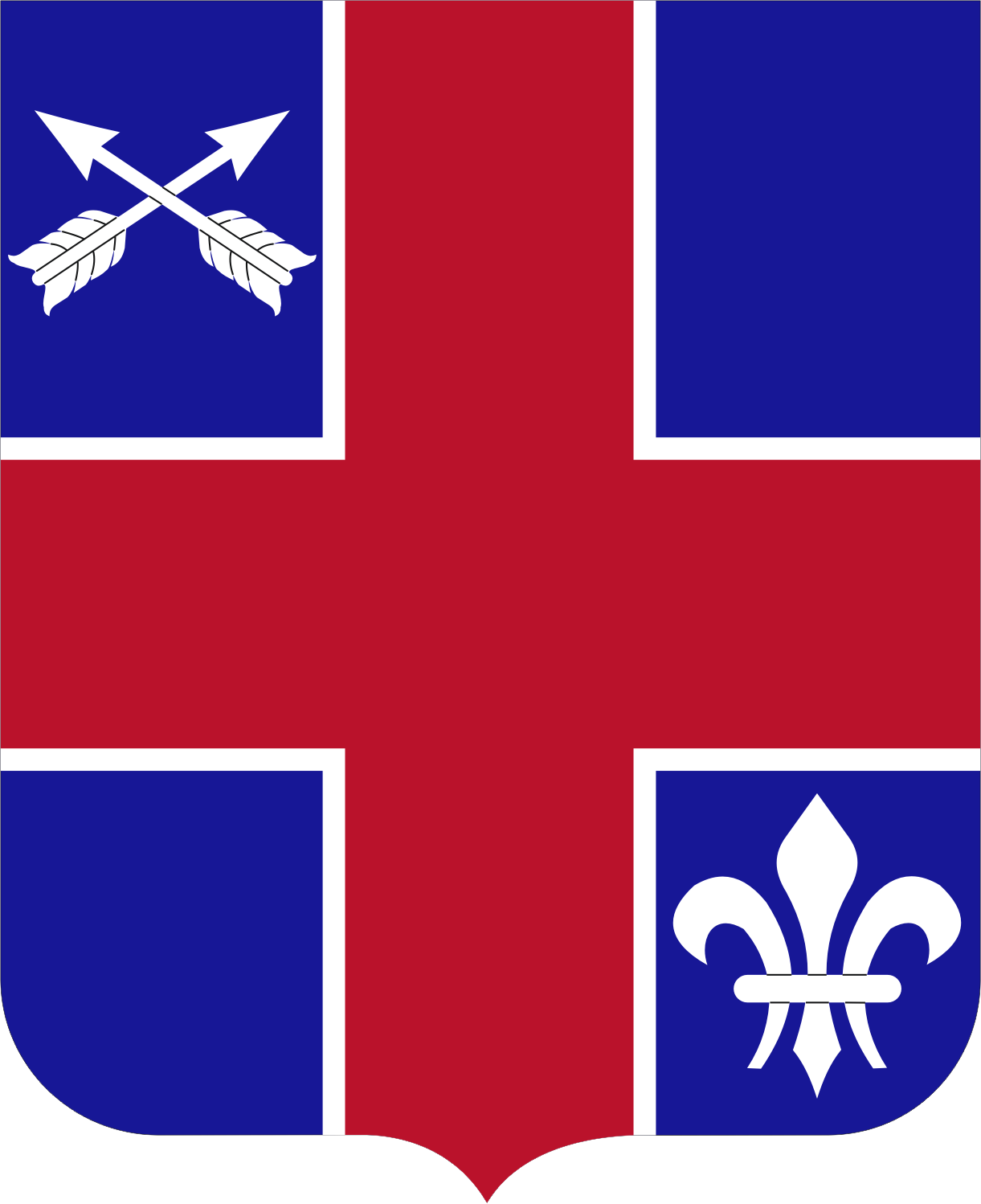
- Coat of arms
- Active: 1918
- Country: United States
- Branch: United States Army
- Type: Infantry
- Size: Regiment
- Mottos: '"Audax et Fortis" (Bold and Brave)

Commanders
- Notable commanders: Edwin A. Walker

Insignia
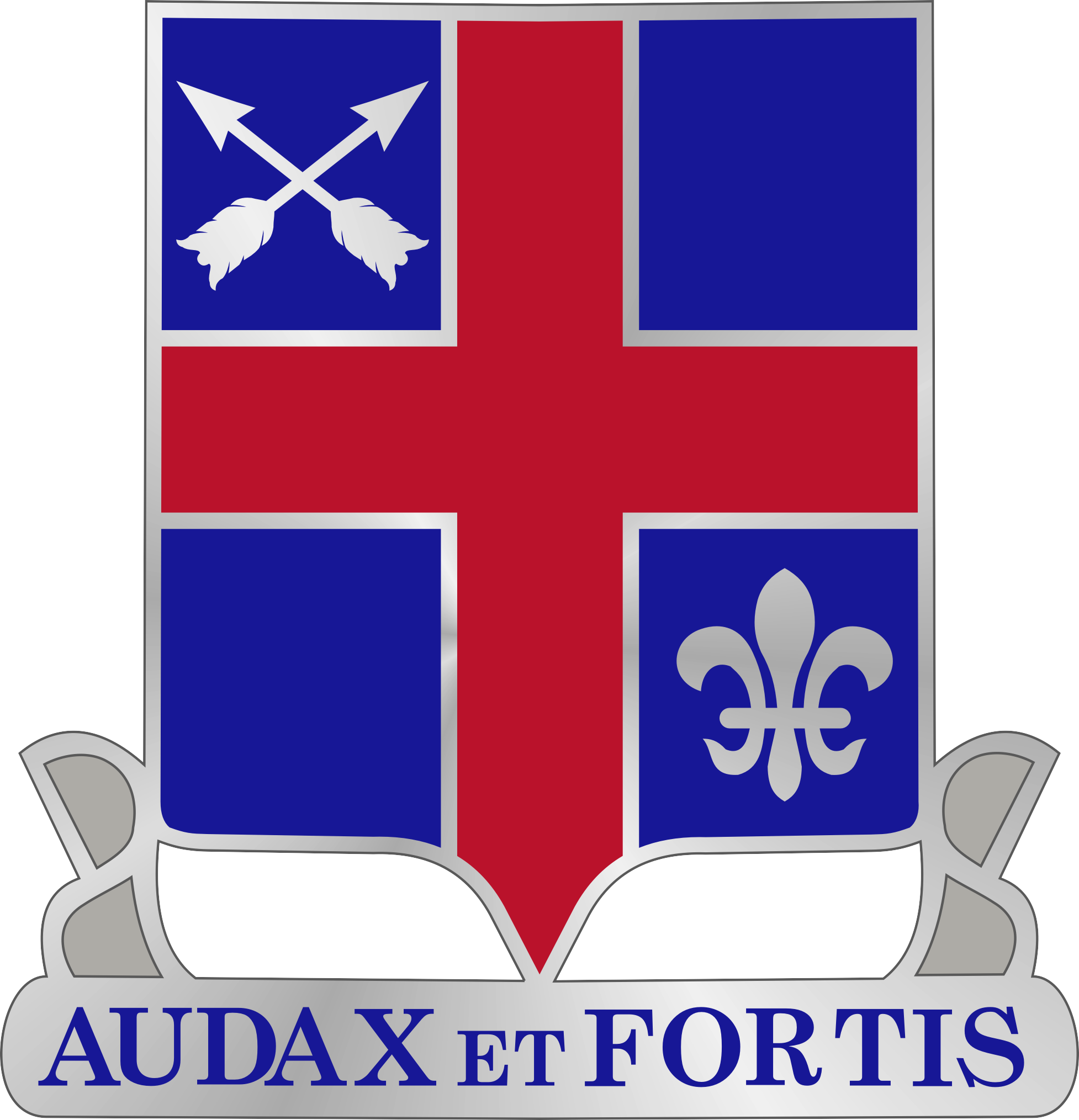
- DUI

The 74th Infantry Regiment was a regular infantry regiment of the United States Army. There have been two units given the title '74th Infantry Regiment'; the first was a World War I unit of the 12th Division, and the second was a World War II unit formed with US Army personnel and equipment of the inactivating US-Canadian 1st Special Service Force "Devil's Brigade". This unit was first designated as the 474th Infantry Regiment, later redesignated as the 74th Infantry Regiment.

== World War I regiment ==
Constituted 9 July 1918 in the Regular Army as the 74th Infantry and assigned to the 12th Division. Organized July 1918 at Camp Devens, Massachusetts. Relieved from the 12th Division and demobilized 31 January 1919 at Camp Devens. Reconstituted 18 July 1941 in the Regular Army. Disbanded 4 August 1952.

== World War II regiment ==
SSI of the 74th RCT

Constituted 11 November 1944 in the Regular Army as the 474th Infantry. Activated 6 January 1945 in France with American personnel from the joint Canadian-American 1st Special Service Force. (99th Infantry Battalion replaced 3rd Battalion on 25 January 1945.) Inactivated, less 99th Infantry Battalion, on 26 October 1945 at Camp Shanks, New York. 99th Infantry Battalion inactivated on 2 November 1945 at Camp Miles Standish, Massachusetts.

Redesignated 74th Infantry Regimental Combat Team on 21 June 1954 and activated on 8 October 1954 at Fort Devens, Massachusetts. Inactivated, less the 99th Infantry Battalion, on 16 September 1956 at Fort Devens; concurrently the 99th Infantry Battalion was relieved as an organic element of the 74th Infantry.

This unit earned a campaign streamer for Central Europe.

== Distinctive unit insignia ==
- Description

A Silver color and metal enamel device 1 1/8 inches (2.9 cm) in height overall consisting of a shield blazoned: Azure, a cross Gules fimbriated Argent, in dexter chief two arrows saltirewise of the like, and in sinister base a fleur-de-lis of the last. Attached below a Silver scroll inscribed "AUDAX ET FORTIS" (Bold and Brave) in Blue letters.

- Symbolism

Blue is the color used for Infantry. The red cross appears on the Norwegian flag and alludes to the 3d Battalion (99th Infantry Battalion), constituted and activated in 1942, and composed of the citizens of Norway living in the United States and Norwegian speaking Americans. The make-up of the remainder of the Regiment was American personnel from the joint Canadian-American 1st Special Service Force; signified by its badge of two crossed arrows. The fleur-de-lis represents the Regiment's European battle honors awarded for service during World War II. The motto translates "Bold and Brave."

The distinctive unit insignia was approved on 23 August 1954.
