= Augustus P. Blocksom =

United States Army general

Augustus Perry Blocksom
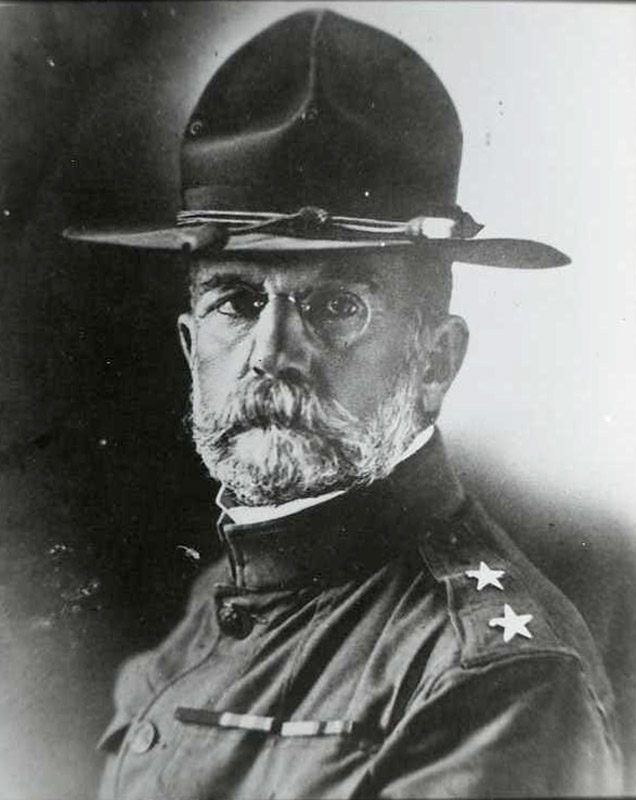
- Blocksom as commander of Camp Cody during World War I
- Born: November 7, 1854; Zanesville, Ohio
- Died: July 26, 1931 (aged 76); Miami, Florida
- Burial place: Arlington National Cemetery
- Military career
- Allegiance: United States
- Branch: United States Army
- Service years: 1877–1918
- Rank: Major General
- Service number: 0-13120
- Unit: United States Cavalry
- Commands: 1st Squadron, 6th Cavalry; 2nd Squadron, 7th Cavalry; 3rd Squadron, 13th Cavalry; 3rd Squadron, 6th Cavalry; 3rd Squadron, 10th Cavalry; 3rd Cavalry Regiment; Camp Cody; 34th Division; Hawaiian Department
- Conflicts: Apache Wars; Ghost Dance War; Spanish–American War; Philippine–American War; China Relief Expedition; Pancho Villa Expedition; World War I
- Awards: Silver Citation Star (2)

Augustus Perry Blocksom (November 7, 1854 – July 26, 1931) was an American Army officer, who served as a general during World War I.

== Early life ==
Blocksom was born on November 7, 1854, in Zanesville, Ohio. He attended the United States Military Academy and graduated in the class of 1877.

== Military career ==
Blocksom was commissioned as a second lieutenant of cavalry on June 15, 1877. He later received a brevet to first lieutenant for gallantry at Ash Creek, Arizona, on May 7, 1880. He served in campaigns against the Apaches in Arizona, which included patrolling the Arizona-New Mexico border, and in the Sioux Campaign of 1890 and 1891.

During the Spanish–American War, he was wounded in the attack on Battle of San Juan Hill and served from 1900 to 1902 in the Philippines.

Blocksom, then a major, was charged with investigating the Brownsville raid of 1906 and stated that the enlisted soldiers there were uncooperative in his investigation. Blocksom also reported that no positive identifications of the raiders had been made and that tensions in the community were high.

He commanded a squadron of the Sixth Cavalry during the China Relief Expedition.

He was promoted to major general on August 5, 1917. He was the commander of Camp Cody until April 18, 1918.

He retired on November 7, 1918.

== Awards ==
2 Silver Citation Stars.

== Death and legacy ==
Blocksom retired to Miami, Florida, where he died on July 26, 1931. He was buried at Arlington National Cemetery, Section 7, Lot 8005.
