= 97th Infantry Division (United States) =

97th Infantry Division 97th Training Brigade
- 97th Infantry Division shoulder sleeve insignia
- Active: 5 September – 22 December 1918 (National Army); 24 June 1921 – 31 March 1946 (Organized Reserves); 22 December 1967–16 April 1996 (97th ARCOM); 3 November 2010 – present (96th Training Bge.)
- Country: United States
- Branch: United States Army Reserve
- Type: Infantry Training
- Size: Division; Brigade
- Part of: 100th Training Division
- Garrison/HQ: Fort Sheridan, Illinois
- Nickname: Trident
- Motto: Preparedness By Example
- Engagements: World War II; Central Europe

Insignia
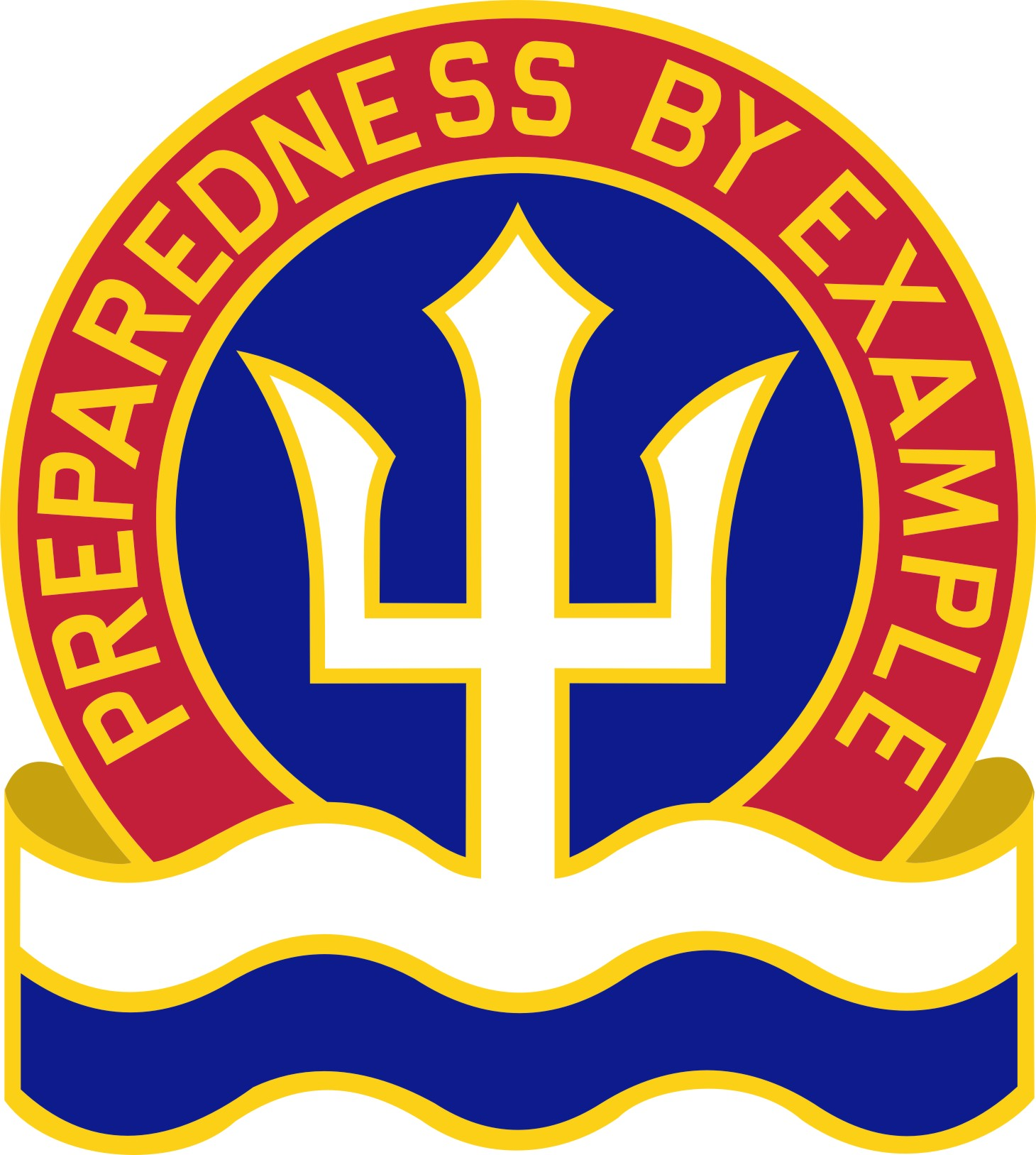
- 97TH TRAINING BRIGADE DUI

The 97th Infantry Division was a unit of the United States Army in World War I and World War II. Nicknamed the "Trident division" because of its shoulder patch, a vertical trident in white on a blue background. It was organized in New Mexico in September 1918, where it was ordered to be demobilized – before having reached its full complement – nine days after the Armistice of 11 November 1918. It was reconstituted in February 1943, and was originally trained for World War II in amphibious assaults, as preparation for deployment in the Pacific Theater. Instead, it was deployed to Europe in 1944 when casualties from the Battle of the Bulge needed to be replaced.

Since 3 November 2010 the division's heritage is continued by the 97th Training Brigade at Fort Sheridan.

== History ==
=== World War I ===
The 97th Division was one of the divisions planned to be activated in late 1918 and deployed to France in 1919 to reinforce the American Expeditionary Force. The division was organized at Camp Cody, Deming, New Mexico and activated on 5 September 1918. It included the 193rd and 194th Infantry Brigades, and the 172nd Field Artillery Brigade. The 194th was to be organized and trained at Camp Cody, the 172nd at Camp Jackson, South Carolina, and the 193rd was to be organized in France with the AEF. The division's cadre consisted of over 1,000 trained officers and enlisted men, and Colonel Carl A. Martin became its first commander on 26 September.

The division was intended to be composed of National Army draftees mainly from Maine, Vermont and New Hampshire, but in October, over 5,000 draftees, mainly from Oklahoma and Minnesota, were sent to the division at Camp Cody. Initial instruction at Camp Cody went relatively well, but the 172nd Brigade's training at Camp Jackson was delayed by a lack of personnel. Its regiments were at less than half-strength as late as the beginning of November. In late October, the 97th was struck by the 1918 flu pandemic, which sickened over 500 soldiers and killed more than 100. On 25 October, Brigadier General James R. Lindsay became division commander as Martin became its chief of staff. The war ended with the Armistice of 11 November, and the 97th was ordered to be demobilized on 20 November. At the time, it was only partially organized and consisted of 402 officers and 7,889 men. The demobilization was completed on 22 December.

Neptune's trident was originally adopted as the division's symbol, to represent the coastal states of Maine, Vermont and New Hampshire, from which the first recruits were drawn in 1918. The three prongs of the trident represent the three states, the blue symbolizes the states' numerous fresh water lakes, and the white of the border and trident represents the snow that covers these states' mountains.

==== Order of Battle ====
- Division Headquarters
- 387th Infantry Regiment
- 388th Infantry Regiment
- 622nd Field Signal Battalion
- 366th Machine Gun Battalion
- 322nd Train Headquarters and Military Police
- 322nd Sanitary Train

172nd Field Artillery Brigade The brigade was organized at Camp Jackson, South Carolina, under the command of Brigadier General Dennis H. Currie.

- 61st Field Artillery Regiment
- 62nd Field Artillery Regiment
- 63rd Field Artillery Regiment
- 21st Trench Mortar Battery
- 322nd Ammunition Train

Commanders

- Colonel Carl A. Martin – 26 September 1918 to 19 October 1918;
- Brigadier General James R. Lindsay – 19 October 1918 until demobilization on 20 November 1918.

=== Interwar period ===
The 97th Division was reconstituted in the Organized Reserve on 24 June 1921, allotted to the First Corps Area, and assigned to the XI Corps. The division was further allotted to the states of New Hampshire, Maine, and Vermont as its home area. The headquarters was organized in December 1921 initially at Augusta, Maine, then relocated in September 1922 to the Bell Building at 922 Elm Street in Manchester, New Hampshire. The headquarters was again relocated in August 1923 to the Federal Building in Manchester. In late 1937, the headquarters was transferred to the new Post Office Building in Portland, and remained there until activated for World War II. The 373rd–375th Infantry Regiments, part of the provisional 94th Division in World War I which was intended to be composed of Puerto Rican soldiers, were allotted to Puerto Rico's 211th Infantry Brigade as part of a hypothetical division which was never organized, and the unorganized 376th Infantry was assigned to the 94th Division, which was allotted to Massachusetts. To flesh out the rest of the 94th Division's infantry, the 301st and 302nd Infantry Regiments (part of the 76th Division in World War I) were assigned, along with the newly constituted 419th Infantry. The 76th Division retained only its World War I-era 304th Infantry, taking the 385th Infantry from the 97th Division and adding the newly constituted 417th and 418th Infantry Regiments, while the 97th Division took the 76th Division's 303rd Infantry and retained the 386th–388th Infantry Regiments.

After its organization, the 97th Division rapidly built its strength. Although the division area had virtually no major population centers and possessed a poor highway network, the division was above 90 percent complete by November 1923. Due to the poor road network and because the division's officers tended to be concentrated in the larger towns, the division's personnel, less those in the infantry regiments, tended to hold their inactive training meetings as "group" meetings (i.e., without respect to unit assignment) rather than unit meetings. To maintain communications with the officers of the division, the division staff published a newsletter titled the "97th Division Bulletin." The newsletter informed the division's members of such things as when and where the inactive training sessions were to be held, what the division's summer training quotas were, where the camps were to be held, and which units would be assigned to help conduct the Citizens Military Training Camps (CMTC).

The mobilization and training station for the division was Camp Devens, Massachusetts, the location where much of the 97th's training activities occurred over the next 20 years. For the few summers when the division headquarters was called to duty for training as a unit, the 97th Division trained with the staff of the 9th Division's 18th Infantry Brigade at Camp Devens, and occasionally with the staff of the 5th Infantry Regiment at Fort Williams, Maine. The summer training for the personnel assigned to the division headquarters was varied and included staff training, branch-specific training, and division-level command post exercises (CPXs). For several summers, however, the division conducted a "Special Officers Camp" at Fort Ethan Allen, Vermont, which consisted of training for unassigned officers, officers who could not attend training with their assigned units, and basic officer training for recent ROTC and CMTC commissionees. The division also held periodic contact camps during the inactive training period, usually at Poland Spring, Maine.

The division's subordinate units trained all over the First Corps Area. Divisional infantry regiments, for example, held their summer training primarily with the units of the 18th Infantry Brigade at Camp Devens; Fort Ethan Allen; Fort Adams, Rhode Island; and Forts McKinley and Williams, Maine. Other units, such as the special troops, artillery, engineers, aviation, medical, and quartermaster, trained at various posts in the First, Second, and Third Corps Areas with Regular Army units of the same branch. For example, the 322nd Engineer Regiment usually trained with elements of the 1st Engineer Regiment at Fort DuPont, Delaware; the 322nd Medical Regiment trained with the 1st Medical Regiment at Carlisle Barracks, Pennsylvania; and the 322nd Observation Squadron trained with the 5th Observation Squadron at Mitchel Field, New York. In addition to the unit training camps, the infantry regiments of the division rotated responsibility to conduct the CMTC held at Camp Devens, Fort McKinley, and Fort Ethan Allen each year.

On a number of occasions, the division participated in First Corps Area and First Army CPXs in conjunction with other Regular Army, National Guard, and Organized Reserve units. These training events gave division staff officers' opportunities to practice the roles they would be expected to perform in the event the division was mobilized. Unlike the Regular and Guard units in the First Corps Area, the 97th Division did not participate in the various First Corps Area maneuvers and the First Army maneuvers of 1935, 1939, and 1940 as an organized unit due to lack of enlisted personnel and equipment. Instead, the officers and a few enlisted reservists were assigned to Regular and Guard units to fill vacant slots and bring the units up to full peace strength for the exercises. Additionally, some officers were assigned duties as umpires or as support personnel.

=== World War II ===
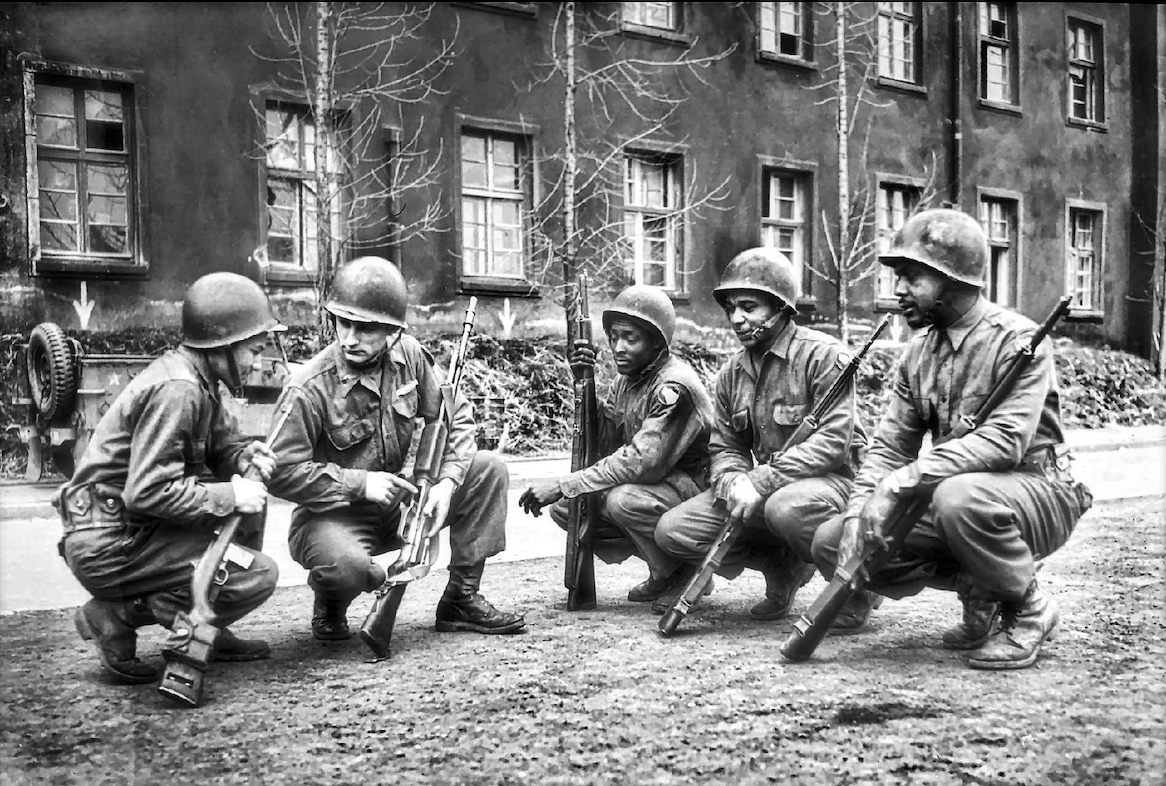
G.I.'s of the 97th Infantry Division in Cologne, Germany, 18 March 1945

- Overseas: 19 February 1945 for the ETO;
- Returned to U.S.: 16 June 1945, from the ETO
- Overseas: 28 August 1945, for the Pacific Theater, arriving 25 September 1945 in Yokohama, Japan
- Campaigns: Central Europe
- Days of combat: 41 (ETO)
- Prisoners of war taken in the ETO: 48,796
- Inactivated: 31 March 1946 in Japan

==== Mobilization ====
Before Organized Reserve infantry divisions were ordered into active military service, they were reorganized on paper as "triangular" divisions under the 1940 tables of organization. The headquarters companies of the two infantry brigades were consolidated into the division's cavalry reconnaissance troop, and one infantry regiment was removed by inactivation. The field artillery brigade headquarters and headquarters battery became the headquarters and headquarters battery of the division artillery. Its three field artillery regiments were reorganized into four battalions; one battalion was taken from each of the two 75 mm gun regiments to form two 105 mm howitzer battalions, the brigade's ammunition train was reorganized as the third 105 mm howitzer battalion, and the 155 mm howitzer battalion was formed from the 155 mm howitzer regiment. The engineer, medical, and quartermaster regiments were reorganized into battalions. In 1942, divisional quartermaster battalions were split into ordnance light maintenance companies and quartermaster companies, and the division's headquarters and military police company, which had previously been a combined unit, was split.

During 1942, the activation rate of Army units was proceeding faster than the expected induction rate of new soldiers to keep pace with the anticipated troop basis, thousands of new service units not previously contemplated were being formed, unanticipated requirements for task forces for the European and Pacific Theaters and the need to fill out units moving overseas had to be met, and there was an urgent need for personnel to participate in the Operation Torch landings in North Africa planned for November 1942. As a result, three partially-trained divisions (the 30th, 31st, and 33rd) were stripped to less than 50 percent strength in part to provide the new men (along with the 35th, 38th, and 44th, which suffered lesser losses) and the activation of the 97th Infantry Division, which was originally planned for December 1942, was deferred until early 1943.

The 97th Infantry Division was ordered into active military service on 25 February 1943 at Camp Swift, Texas, the last of the Organized Reserve infantry divisions to enter active duty. Most of the cadre for the 97th came from the 95th Infantry Division stationed at Fort Sam Houston, Texas. In February 1944 the division was moved to Fort Leonard Wood, Missouri, for additional training. During 1944, approximately 5,000 soldiers were stripped from the division and sent as replacements to other units. Division strength was eventually restored when the Army Specialized Training Program and aviation cadet training program were sharply reduced or terminated and many of their personnel were reassigned to Army Ground Forces for retraining as infantry.

==== Division organization ====
The division consisted of the following units:

97th Infantry Division organization (click to enlarge)

- 97th Infantry Division
  - 97th Infantry Division Headquarters
  - 97th Cavalry Reconnaissance Troop (Mechanized) (M3 scout cars and then M8 Greyhound armored cars)
  - 303rd Infantry Regiment
    - Headquarters and Headquarters Company
    - 3× Infantry battalions
      - each battalion consists of: 1× Headquarters and Headquarters Company, 3× Rifle companies, 1× Heavy Weapons Company
    - Cannon Company (T12 Gun Motor Carriages and T19 Howitzer Motor Carriages, later replaced by either M3 105mm towed howitzers or M7 Priest self propelled howitzers)
    - Anti-Tank Company (M3 37mm anti-tank guns, which were replaced by 1944 with M1 57mm anti-tank guns)
    - Service Company
  - 386th Infantry Regiment
    - same organization as 303rd Infantry Regiment
  - 387th Infantry Regiment
    - same organization as 303rd Infantry Regiment
  - 97th Infantry Division Artillery
    - Headquarters and Headquarters Battery
    - 303rd Field Artillery Battalion
      - Headquarters and Headquarters Battery
      - 3× Batteries (M2 105mm towed howitzers)
      - Service Battery
    - 365th Field Artillery Battalion
      - same organization as 303rd Field Artillery Battalion
    - 389th Field Artillery Battalion
      - Headquarters and Headquarters Battery
      - 3× Batteries (M1 155mm towed howitzers)
      - Service Battery
    - 922nd Field Artillery Battalion
      - same organization as 303rd Field Artillery Battalion
  - Headquarters Special Troops
    - Headquarters Company, 97th Infantry Division
    - 97th Signal Company
    - 97th Quartermaster Company
    - 797th Ordnance Light Maintenance Company
    - Military Police Platoon
    - 97th Infantry Division Band (attached)
  - 322nd Engineer Combat Battalion
    - Headquarters and Headquarters and Service Company
    - 3× Engineer combat companies
  - 322nd Medical Battalion
    - Headquarters and Headquarters Detachment
    - 3× Collecting companies
    - Clearing Company

==== Training ====
In July 1944 the division relocated to Camp San Luis Obispo, California. Under the supervision of the Navy and Marine Corps, the division began amphibious training and exercises at Camp Callan, Coronado Strand, San Clemente Island, San Nicolas Island and Camp Pendleton. In September 1944 the 97th was transferred to Camp Cooke, California, for further amphibious training.

In early January 1945, General Dwight D. Eisenhower, the Supreme Commander of Allied forces on the Western Front, was alarmed over the swift progress the Germans had made during the waning Battle of the Bulge and was concerned that the Germans could move additional reinforcements to the west from the Eastern Front. He requested additional divisions over and above those already earmarked for the European theater. The 86th and 97th Infantry Divisions, allocated for service in the Pacific, were ordered to the European Theater of Operations (ETO) instead for the final assault on Germany. The strength of the division upon deployment in Europe was 600 officers and 14,000 men.

==== Combat chronicle ====
After assembly and training at Camp Cooke in California, the 97th Infantry Division was transported by train to Camp Kilmer, New Jersey. The division embarked on troopships in New York and landed at Le Havre, France on 2 March 1945, then moved to Camp Lucky Strike. After crossing France by troop train, the division passed through Maastricht and crossed the German border west of Aachen on 28 March, taking up a defensive position along the west bank of the Rhine River opposite Düsseldorf. As all bridges over the Rhine had been destroyed and the city was well-defended, the 97th was ordered to move south along the west bank of the Rhine, crossing over it near Bonn on 3 April and taking up a position on the southern bank of the Sieg River at Hennef.

The division then entered the battle of the Ruhr pocket, crossing the Sieg River on 7 April, battling German Wehrmacht troops defending Schloss Allner. According to the after action report:

"Machine-gun fire was strafing the crossing area from castle near ALLNER where it had a clear field of fire and from a wooded spur at a bend in the river W of the crossing, firing upriver toward the boats. Artillery fire, TD's, heavy MG fire and mortars were all brought to bear on this castle but although it crumbled, the MG fire continued. Fire was also coming from the high ground N of the river."

In two days the 922nd Field Artillery Battalion fired over three thousand rounds at the area around the castle. Pfc John Hedrick seized an abandoned assault boat while under heavy enemy fire and used the craft to help ferry troops across the river. He was awarded the Silver Star. After crossing the river, elements of the 387th Infantry Regiment assaulted the castle:

"The 2d Battalion hit very stiff resistance at the ALLNER Castle and on the ridge in the loop of the river. Anti-tank company and the TD's blasted the castle from the S bank of the SIEG River and G Company was able to clear it out."

Entering Siegburg on 10 April, troops again encountered heavy resistance at the Glockner works.

On 12 April Pfc Joe R. Hastings of Company C, 386th Infantry Regiment, distinguished himself in action at Drabenderhöhe, Germany while attacking an enemy position. According to his citation:

"[Hastings] rushed forward over 350 yards of open, rolling fields to reach a position from which he could fire on the enemy troops. From this vantage point he killed the crews of a 20mm gun and a machine gun, drove several enemy riflemen from their positions, and so successfully shielded the 1st Platoon that it had time to reorganize and remove its wounded to safety. Observing that the 3d Platoon to his right was being met by very heavy 40mm and machine gun fire, he ran 150 yards with his gun to the leading elements of that unit, where he killed the crew of the 40mm gun...[He then] advanced, firing his gun held at hip height, disregarding the bullets that whipped past him, until the assault had carried 175 yards to the objective...He was killed 4 days later while again supporting the 3d Platoon."

He received the Medal of Honor posthumously for his actions.

On 14 April, intelligence officers from the 97th Division liberated approximately 800 prisoners of war, including 177 Americans, being held at a POW camp in Hoffnungstal, near Much, Germany.

Pushing on toward Düsseldorf through difficult terrain and heavy resistance in densely wooded areas, the division captured Solingen on 17 April. Düsseldorf fell without much fighting the next day, after the German Resistance launched Aktion Rheinland, and the Ruhr pocket was eliminated by 21 April.

==== Flossenbürg concentration camp ====
On 23 April elements of the 97th, together with members of the 90th Infantry Division, liberated Flossenbürg concentration camp near Floß in Bavaria. A military police patrol from the 303rd Infantry Regiment may have been the first U.S. Army unit to reach the camp, although the 2nd Cavalry Group, Mechanized and a colonel from the 90th Infantry Division later took credit for liberating the camp. Members of the 97th Division treated sick and dying prisoners and buried the several hundred corpses discovered in the camp. Brigadier General Milton B. Halsey inspected the camp as did General Sherman V. Hasbrouck, the commanding officer of the division artillery. Members of the Counter Intelligence Corps, which included Robie Macauley, Ib Melchior and Anthony Hecht, interviewed former prisoners and gathered evidence for trials of former camp officers and guards. The 97th also liberated Helmbrechts concentration camp, a sub-camp of Flossenbürg for female prisoners.

The following day a unit of the 97th CIC Detachment led by Captain Oscar M. Grimes captured about two hundred Gestapo officers and men in hiding near Hof, Bavaria. They were in possession of American uniforms and equipment, but had evidently made the decision to surrender.

==== Czechoslovakia ====
On 25 April the division entered Czechoslovakia, moving to protect the left flank of the Third Army on its southern drive. The 97th took Cheb, Czechoslovakia, on 25 April 1945 and attacked the Czechoslovak pocket near Weiden, Germany on 29 April. It had advanced to Konstantinovy Lázně, Czechoslovakia, when it received the ceasefire order on 7 May. Part of the division was in Teplá where the German 2nd Panzer Division had surrendered. The troops used the monastery there as a POW camp for the Germans.

The 97th Infantry Division was credited with firing the last official shot in the European Theatre of Operations during World War II. This shot was fired by Pfc. Domenic Mozzetta (1925–2001) of Company B, 387th Infantry Regiment, 97th Infantry Division, at a German sniper near Klenovice, Czechoslovakia shortly before midnight, 7 May 1945.

==== Commanders ====
- Major General Louis A. Craig, 4 February 1943 – 19 January 1944
- Brigadier General Milton B. Halsey, 20 January 1944 – 24 September 1945
- Major General Herman F. Kramer, 24 September 1945 – inactivation on 31 March 1946.

==== Casualties ====
- Total battle casualties: 979
- Killed in action: 188
- Wounded in action: 721
- Missing in action: 9
- Prisoner of war: 61

==== Assignments in the ETO ====
- 30 January 1945: Fifteenth Army, 12th Army Group
- 28 March 1945: XXII Corps
- 1 April 1945: First Army, 12th Army Group
- 10 April 1945: XVIII (Abn) Corps
- 19 April 1945: Third Army, 12th Army Group
- 22 April 1945: XII Corps
- 28 April 1945: First Army, 12th Army Group
- 30 April 1945: V Corps
- 6 May 1945: Third Army, 12th Army Group

==== Command posts in the ETO ====
- 2 Mar 45 – Camp Lucky Strike, Seine-Inferieure, France
- 28 Mar 45 – Lövenich, Rhineland, Germany
- 31 Mar 45 – Glehn, Rhineland, Germany
- 4 Apr 45 – Oberpleis, Rhineland, Germany
- 12 Apr 45 – Siegburg, Rhineland, Germany
- 14 Apr 45 – Rosrath, Rhineland, Germany
- 15 Apr 45 – Bergisch Gladbach, Rhineland, Germany
- 17 Apr 45 – Solingen, Rhineland, Germany
- 21 Apr 45 – Hof, Bavaria, Germany
- 23 Apr 45 – Wunsiedel, Bavaria, Germany
- 29 Apr 45 – Weiden in der Oberpfalz, Bavaria, Germany
- 5 May 45 – Tachov, Bohemia, Czechoslovakia
- 7 May 45 – Konstantinovy Lázně, Bohemia, Czechoslovakia
- 9 May 45 – Tachov, Bohemia, Czechoslovakia
- 15 May 45 – Memmelsdorf, Bavaria, Germany
- 1 Jun 45 – Camp Old Gold, Seine-Inferieure, France

==== Individual awards ====
- 1 Medal of Honor
  - Private first class Joe R. Hastings (Posthumously)
- 6 Distinguished Service Crosses
  - Cpl Platt Adams Jr. (Posth.)
  - 1st Lt John P. Mattfeldt (Posth.)
  - S/Sgt Kenneth W. Mize (Posth.)
  - T/Sgt Alfred A. Renzella
  - Capt William R. Weir Jr. (Posth.)
  - Sgt Karl E. Wetzl (Posth.)
- 1 Distinguished Service Medal
- 61 Silver Stars
- 2 Legions of Merit
  - BG Sherman V. Hasbrouck
  - Col Samuel M. Lansing
- 3 Soldier's Medals
- 206 Bronze Stars

=== Post-war ===
The division left Le Havre on 16 June 1945 aboard the SS Brazil, arriving at Camp Shanks on 24 June. After a 30-day leave, the division reassembled at Fort Bragg, crossed the US by troop train and on 1 September embarked aboard the USS Grundy for redeployment to the Pacific, arriving at Cebu, Philippine Islands on 16 September and then sailing to Japan for occupation duty, the first unit previously stationed in Europe to arrive in Japan after the end of the war. Arriving at Yokohama on 25 September 1945, the division relieved the 43rd Infantry Division and established its headquarters at Mitsugahara Airfield in Kumagaya. By December the 97th had reached its maximum deployment through six prefectures: Saitama, Gunma, Nagano, Niigata, Fukushima, and Tochigi.

Confiscating and disposing of Japanese military property proved to be the Division's prime task. The 97th returned 198,142,046 pounds of foodstuffs, 670,226 gallons of gasoline, 8,568,857 yards of cloth and 480,343 pairs of boots and shoes to the Japanese government for distribution to civilians.

On 26 October counter-intelligence officers from the 97th Division located $2.5 million worth of stolen radium in the German consulate in Osaka, and another $3 million in silver bullion in a warehouse in Iida, Nagano. On 31 October, Special Agent Robie Macauley of the division's counter-intelligence unit arrested 26 prominent Nazis who were in hiding in Karuizawa.

The division was inactivated on 31 March 1946 in Yokohama.

Command posts in Japan:

- 25 Sep 45 – Mitsugahara Airfield in Kumagaya, Saitama, Japan
- 7 Oct 45 – Ueda, Nagano, Japan

=== Cold War ===
On 15 July 1962, the division's 97th Cavalry Reconnaissance Troop was converted and redesignated, less the 3rd Platoon, as the Headquarters and Headquarters Company, 193rd Infantry Brigade, and relieved from assignment to the 97th Infantry Division. Concurrently, it was withdrawn from the Army Reserve and allotted to the Regular Army.

The 3rd Platoon, 97th Cavalry Reconnaissance Troop was concurrently converted and redesignated as the Headquarters and Headquarters Company, 194th Infantry Brigade – hereafter separate lineage). The unit was reactivated shortly thereafter on 8 August 1962 in the Panama Canal Zone.

On 22 December 1967, the 97th Army Reserve Command (ARCOM) was activated at Fort Meade, Maryland. The new ARCOM took control of 12 major subordinate commands from the deactivating XXI Corps (United States) at Indiantown Gap Military Reservation. They included the 10th JAG Detachment; the 11th Special Forces Group; the 170th Direct Support and 220th Military Police Groups; the 1176th U.S. Army Terminal; the 2122nd U.S. Army Garrison; the 2070th, 2071st, 2076th, 2079th, and 2086th U.S. Army Reserve Schools; and the 2290th U.S. Army Reserve Hospital. The 97th ARCOM assumed command of these units on 1 June 1968, and XXI Corps inactivated a month later.

While the 97th ARCOM was allowed to wear the shoulder sleeve insignia of the 97th Infantry Division and use its number, Department of the Army policy does not allow for the lineage of Table of Organization and Equipment (TOE) units, such as infantry divisions, to be perpetuated by Table of Distribution (TDA) units, such as ARCOMs.

Three medical units of the 97th were mobilized and deployed to South Vietnam during the Vietnam War.

In U.S. military Operations in Panama to oust dictator Manuel Noriega in 1989, the 97th deployed troops to neutralize key Panamanian Defense Forces positions on the Pacific side of the Canal Zone; civil affairs soldiers from the 97th later assisted in rebuilding the new Government of Panama.

During operations Desert Shield and Desert Storm, more than 3,000 division troops deployed to missions in the Persian Gulf.

In 1996, as part of the overall force reduction following the end of the Cold War, the 97th Army Reserve Command was inactivated and its units were absorbed into the 99th Regional Readiness Command.

== 97th Training Brigade ==
On 3 November 2010, the division was designated as Headquarters, 97th Training brigade and on 6 December of the same year the brigade was activated at Fort Sheridan. The brigade is responsible for conducting the Command and General Staff Officers' Course (CGSOC) for US Army Reserve officers.

== Organization ==
The 97th Training Brigade is a subordinate unit of the 100th Training Division (Operational Support). As of January 2026 the brigade consists of the following units:

- 97th Training Brigade (Command and General Staff Officers' Course – CGSOC), at Fort Sheridan (IL)
  - 10th Battalion, 80th Regiment (Command and General Staff Officers' Course – CGSOC), in Owings Mills (MD)
    - Detachment 1, 10th Battalion, 80th Regiment (Command and General Staff Officers' Course – CGSOC), in Schenectady (NY)
  - 11th Battalion, 95th Regiment (Command and General Staff Officers' Course – CGSOC), in Kansas City (MO)
    - Detachment 1, 11th Battalion, 95th Regiment (Command and General Staff Officers' Course – CGSOC), in Lexington (KY)
  - 11th Battalion, 108th Regiment (Command and General Staff Officers' Course – CGSOC), in Concord (NC)
    - Detachment 1, 11th Battalion, 108th Regiment (Command and General Staff Officers' Course – CGSOC), in Columbus (OH)

== See also ==
- The Army Almanac: A Book of Facts Concerning the Army of the United States U.S. Government Printing Office, 1950.
- Command structure, statistics and other details about the 97th Inf Div
- The 97th Infantry Division During World War II
