= Camp Cody, New Mexico =

Former United States Army base

Coordinates: 32.275°N 107.80833°W

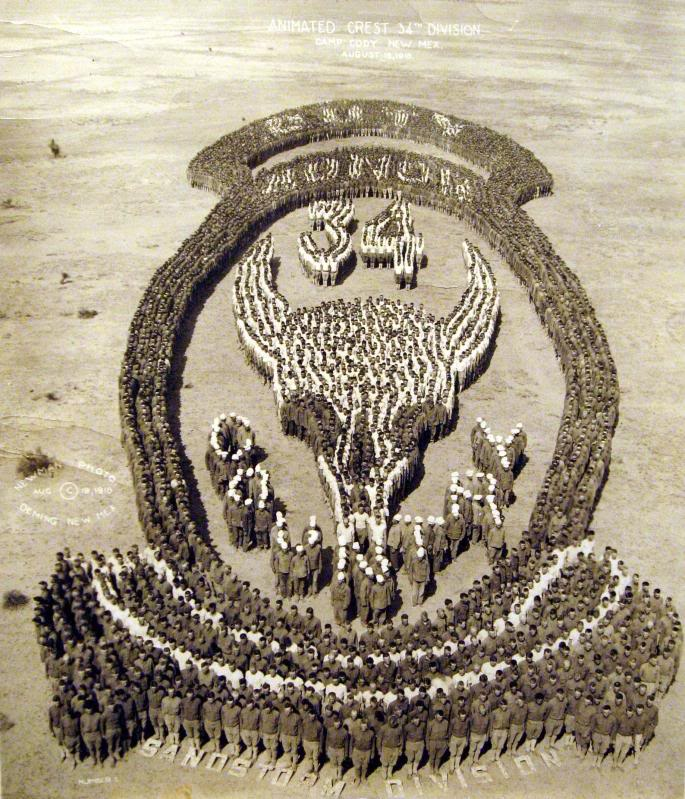
World War I soldiers at Camp Cody forming a human "Animated Crest of the 34th Division" (19 August 1918).

Camp Cody, located on the northwest side of Deming, New Mexico, was a US Army training camp from 1916 to 1919.

== History ==
During World War I, Camp Cody, commanded by Augustus P. Blocksom, was an army training camp for the National Guard units from North and South Dakota, Nebraska, Minnesota, and Iowa. Soldiers received basic training there before leaving for the war in France. The different National Guard units together formed the 34th Infantry Division and were nicknamed the "Sandstorm Division," a name based on the camp's desert climate. Camp Cody was also built because of the threat of Mexican intervention in the first World War.

=== Construction ===
The camp was constructed during the summer of 1917 by the government. Unable to accommodate the 30,000 troops that served at the camp it was necessary to build 120 mess houses and 1,200 bathhouses. Each regiment had its own office building and it took 11 large warehouses to store all the supplies needed for the division. A large hospital was needed and stayed in use long after the war ended.

=== World War One ===
During the US-Mexican Border War the camp was named "Camp Brooks". Then with the beginning of the First World War it was renamed "Camp Deming". The camp was renamed again shortly after the death of the famous buffalo hunter and showman, William F. Cody (1846–1917), better known as "Buffalo Bill Cody." The camp was open from July 16, 1916, until the early months of 1919.

During the 34th Division's mobilization in the summer of 1918, a controversy arose when Frederick Emil Resche, commander of the 68th Infantry Brigade, was accused of anti-American sentiments. Resche, a native of Germany who was a naturalized U.S. citizen and longtime resident of Duluth, Minnesota, had proactively attempted to prevent accusations of disloyalty by taking no actions that could be considered anti-American, including forgoing a visit to his aged, ailing father in Germany. An investigation uncovered no wrongdoing, but Resche was still relieved of command for supposed inefficiency. He then retired from the military and returned to Duluth. The members of his brigade demonstrated their support for Resche by cheering him as he left Camp Cody.

On June 14, 1918, Hughes Co. Oklahoma men enlisted in the US Army. The 113 recruits moved by train from Hughes county to Camp Cody, Deming on 24-29 June. The group included E. F. McKinney and R. B. White from Dustin; Olen Ashby, C. E. Dewitt, Clarence Spruell, Daniel A. Johnson, Leftric Perry, and Tom Sanders from Holdenville; Earl Crane and Raymond Sieminshie from Stuart; Albert Annis, Charles W. Stanfill, William N. Stanfill, and Rufus Garland from Wetumka.

In October 1918, the 97th Division began training and organizing at Camp Cody. Brigadier General James R. Lindsay was assigned to command the division and the post. The Armistice of November 11, 1918 ended the war before the 97th Division departed for France, and it was inactivated in January 1919.

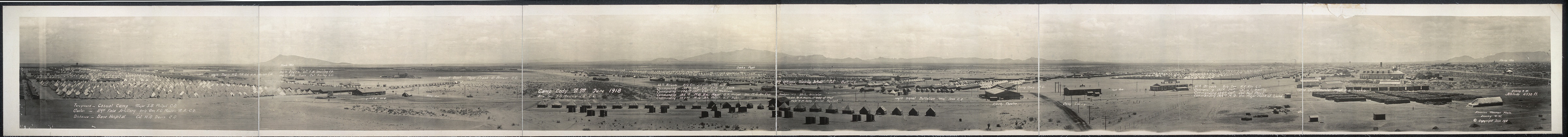
Camp Cody, New Mexico, June 1918.
