= Casual Company =

United States military unit designation

Casual Company, Casual Detachment, or Casual Platoon, sometimes shortened to simply Casual or abbreviated as CasCo, is a type of unit in the United States military.

== Functions ==
It is sometimes-

- A holding unit for military personnel awaiting assignment to a permanent unit, such as after completing basic training or as combat replacements.
- A group awaiting transportation to or from another duty station or for discharge from the military.
- An ad hoc unit formed for a specific assignment or duty, such as guarding prisoners.
- A unit composed of service members on convalescent duty.

== In popular culture ==
Ex-Marine Ed Wood wrote the play The Casual Company based on his wartime experiences
