= 36th Field Artillery Regiment =

US military unit

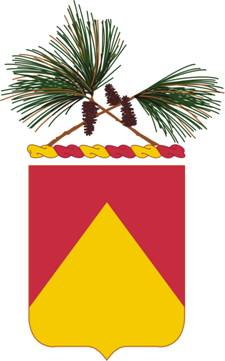
- Coat of arms
- Active: 1918
- Country: United States
- Branch: Army
- Type: Field artillery
- Motto: IN ORDER

Insignia
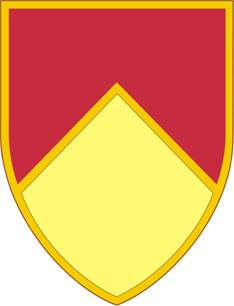
- Distinctive unit insignia

The 36th Field Artillery Regiment is a field artillery regiment of the United States Army.

== History and Lineage ==
=== World War I ===
The 36th Field Artillery Regiment was organized on 7 August 1918 at Camp McClellan, Alabama, as a 155 mm howitzer regiment, and assigned to the 12th Division. It reached a peak strength of 1,733 men, 40 horses, and 12 155mm howitzers, organized as a regimental headquarters battery and six firing batteries. The regiment trained for combat but did not deploy overseas. After the end of the war, the regiment rapidly transferred its soldiers and equipment to other units, and it was demobilized on 8 February 1919.

=== Preparation for World War II ===
The regiment was nominally organized on 11 January 1930 with Organized Reserve personnel as a Regular Army Inactive unit at Gainesville, Florida. On 1 October 1933, the unit was affiliated with the University of Florida ROTC program, and was manned with personnel of the program. The 2nd Battalion was activated on 1 October 1933 at Fort Bragg, North Carolina, by transferring the personnel and equipment from the 2nd Battalion, 5th Field Artillery, which was inactivated. At that time, Battery D, 5th Field Artillery was the oldest unit in the active Army, tracing its lineage to the New York Provisional Company of Artillery, formed by Alexander Hamilton on 6 January 1776. The battalion was equipped with the U.S. version of the French Canon de 155 mm GPF. On 6 November 1939, the 1st and 3rd Battalions were activated.

In late 1940, the regiment was reorganized into a two-battalion regiment, each with three firing batteries, a headquarters battery, and a service battery. Just before the fall 1941 Carolina Maneuvers, the regiment was given two of the new American M1 155 mm guns, later called the "Long Toms" by the British. This was the first tactical test of the new gun, which proved to be a great success. The two sections were organized as a temporary "X" Battery, under the command of Lieutenant (later Colonel) Robert Reed. Lieutenant Reed experimented with new tactics, taking advantage of the longer range and better mobility of the new gun to fire on division and corps headquarters that were out of range of the older guns. These tactics later formed the basis of the operating procedures for the regiment in combat.

=== World War II ===
In the spring of 1942 the regiment completed reequipping with the American 155mm gun. On 1 August it left Fort Bragg for the New York Port of Embarkation, and it arrived in Britain on 17 August, one of the first American combat units deployed to the European Theater.

On 10 December 1942, the 1st Battalion, 36th Field Artillery landed at Oran, Algeria. At 1217 hrs on Christmas Eve, near Medjez El Bab, 2d section, Battery A fired the first American heavy artillery round in the European Theater, starting a mission that silenced a German battery. During the Tunisia campaign, the two battalions of the regiment supported nearly all of the Allied forces involved in the battle. The battalions were constantly separated because they were the only field artillery in the theater with their 25,000 yard range, and their services were eagerly sought by both British and American commanders. Lieutenant William Wall, Forward Observer for Battery A, broke up a large German armored attack by directing his battery's fire on it. He opened fire at 18,000 yards, and the tanks closed to 7,000 yards before withdrawing. At this range only one of the battery's guns could continue to fire, and the rest of the battery had loaded into trucks and was prepared to abandon the position and destroy the guns. The commander of the tanks, during questioning after his capture, said that he turned around because he was not willing to face the 155mm guns in direct fire. During this campaign, the 1st Battalion achieved another "first", becoming the first American field artillery unit of the war to destroy enemy aircraft by artillery fire, during an artillery "raid" on a forward airfield.

During the Sicily campaign the two battalions were again separated, supporting different divisions. During the last part of the Sicilian campaign, Headquarters Battery, 36th Field Artillery served as the provisional headquarters for all American artillery in Sicily. From 29 August to 3 September 1943 the 2d Battalion fired the first American artillery to hit the European mainland, across the straits of Messina in support of the British 8th Army. The battalion set an ammunition dump on fire and silenced five German 170mm gun positions.

The 36th Field Artillery landed on the hot Salerno beach beginning on 12 September, and participated in the drive on Naples and the Foggia airfields, then turning north to Cassino. During these operations, Battery C fired a "perfect mission", setting an ammunition train at Avellino on fire with the first round in adjustment at a range of 22,000 yards. Also during this period, the regiment conducted the first operations with high-performance aircraft adjusting artillery fire, cooperating with P-51s and artillery-trained pilots.

While the 2d Battalion continued fighting at Cassino, the 1st Battalion withdrew from the line and prepared for the Anzio invasion, landing on D day, and providing the heaviest artillery support on the beachhead for the next five months. Both battalions then participated in the drive which freed Rome and continued into the Alban hills.

On 5 March 1944, the regiment was broken up, with Regimental Headquarters, 1st Battalion and 2d Battalion redesignated HHB, 36th FA Group, 36th FA Battalion, and 633d FA Battalion, respectively.

On 8 June 1944, the 1st Battalion was again withdrawn from the line for its longest break, this time in preparation for the invasion of Southern France. The battalion landed on D day, 15 August and raced north with VI Corps to the German border. Here, at the town of Mutzig, first section of Battery B fired the regiment's only direct-fire mission of the war using the Long Toms, at a German fort being held by 92 men. From 1 December until the end of the war, the battalion operated with two M12 self-propelled 155mm guns, which were used for special missions, especially direct fire. At the end of the war one battery was in firing position at Seefeld, Austria, prepared to fire on Innsbruck in support of the 103d Infantry Division. Fortunately, negotiations with the city's leaders led to the surrender of the city with no firing.

Meanwhile, the 2d Battalion continued northward through Italy, crossing the Po River in April 1945 and reaching the foothills of the Italian Alps. At one time, while supporting the French Expeditionary Corps, the battalion earned the wrath of one regimental commander for occupying his objective before he reached it. He insisted that they leave the position so that he could secure it.

Regimental Headquarters, known as Headquarters, 36th FA Group, participated in the Southern France invasion and ended the war in Germany.

The regiment earned streamers for 11 World War II campaigns, more than any other regiment in the army. Elements of the regiment earned arrowheads for four amphibious assaults (Sicily, Salerno, Anzio, and Southern France); the only regiments in the history of the army to earn more were the 509th Infantry (five) and the 1st Special Forces (seven).

=== Post World War II ===
All of the components of the 36th Field Artillery were inactivated shortly after the end of World War II. Each component thereafter had a separate history.

Regimental Headquarters (Headquarters, 36th FA Group) was activated 1 April 1951 in Germany and assigned to 7th Army. It was redesignated HHB, 36th Artillery Group on 1 June 1958, and inactivated 30 April 1972.

The 1st Battalion (36th FA Battalion) was activated 1 October 1948 at Fort Lewis, Washington, as a 105mm howitzer battalion. It was inactivated 18 Dec 1950, except for Battery A, which was transferred to Fort Richardson, Alaska and inactivated 10 June 1951. The battalion was activated again on 18 January 1952 at Fort Sill, Oklahoma, as a towed 155mm gun battalion. In 1957 the battalion was designated a gyroscope 8 inch howitzer (atomic) unit, and it transferred to Germany, arriving in Bremerhaven on 12 February 1958.

On 25 June 1958 the 36th Field Artillery reorganized under the Combat Arms Regimental System, and the 36th Field Artillery Battalion became the new 1st Battalion, 36th Field Artillery, tracing its lineage from Battery A, 36th Field Artillery. On 1 August 1963 the battalion was reorganized as an 8-inch howitzer battalion. Since its arrival in Germany, it was stationed at Schwaebisch Hall, Erlangen, Neu Ulm, and Augsburg. In February 1987, it was one of the first nondivisional 8 inch battalions to be re-organized in the 24-gun, split battery configuration. It was one of the leading units in the army developing tactics for this structure.

The 2d Battalion, 36th Field Artillery (633d FA Battalion) was redesignated the 546th FA Battalion and activated 15 September 1948 at Fort Sill, Oklahoma. Due to personnel shortages it was inactivated 25 January 1949 at Fort Sill. It was activated 1 April 1951 at Fort Lewis, Washington, and later transferred to Germany, where it was inactivated on 25 June 1958. Concurrently, the new 2d Battalion, 36th Field Artillery, tracing its lineage from Battery B, 36th Field Artillery, was activated at Fort Sill, Oklahoma as an 8" self propelled howitzer battalion, where it remained until 1986, when it was inactivated.

The 3d Battalion, 36th Field Artillery, tracing its lineage from Battery C, 36th Field Artillery, was activated in the US Army Reserve on 1 June 1959 at Hampton, Virginia, as an 8-inch howitzer battalion. It was inactivated at Hampton, Virginia on 31 January 1968.

The 4th Battalion, 36th Field Artillery, tracing its lineage from Battery D, 36th Field Artillery, was activated in the US Army Reserve on 1 June 1959 at Akron, Ohio, as an 8-inch howitzer battalion. It was inactivated at Akron, Ohio on 31 January 1968.

== Distinctive unit insignia ==
- Description

A Gold color metal and enamel device 1 3/16 inches (3.0 cm) in height consisting of a shield blazoned: Per chevron Gules and Or.

- Symbolism

The "per chevron" division of the shield signifies that the organization has been placed on the active list twice.

- Background

The distinctive unit insignia was originally approved for the 36th Field Artillery on 10 September 1934. It was redesignated for the 36th Field Artillery Battalion on 27 November 1944. The insignia was redesignated for the 36th Artillery Regiment on 21 November 1958. It was redesignated for the 36th Field Artillery Regiment on 1 September 1971.

== Coat of arms ==
- Blazon
- Shield

Per chevron Gules and Or.

- Crest

On a wreath of the colors Or and Gules, two sprays of long leaf Southern pine in saltire Proper. Motto IN ORDER.

  - Symbolism
- Shield

The "per chevron" division of the shield signifies that the organization has been placed on the active list twice.

- Crest

The crest of long leaf pine denotes the allocation of the regiment.

- Background

The coat of arms was originally approved for the 36th Field Artillery on 10 September 1934. It was redesignated for the 36th Field Artillery Battalion on 27 November 1944. The insignia was redesignated for the 36th Artillery Regiment on 21 November 1958. It was redesignated for the 36th Field Artillery Regiment on 1 September 1971.

== Current configuration ==
- 1st Battalion, 36th Field Artillery Regiment
- 2d Battalion, 36th Field Artillery Regiment
- 3d Battalion, 36th Field Artillery Regiment
- 4th Battalion, 36th Field Artillery Regiment
- 5th Battalion, 36th Field Artillery Regiment
- 6th Battalion, 36th Field Artillery Regiment

== See also ==
- Field Artillery Branch (United States)
- U.S. Army Coast Artillery Corps
