= Konstantinovy Lázně =

- Municipality
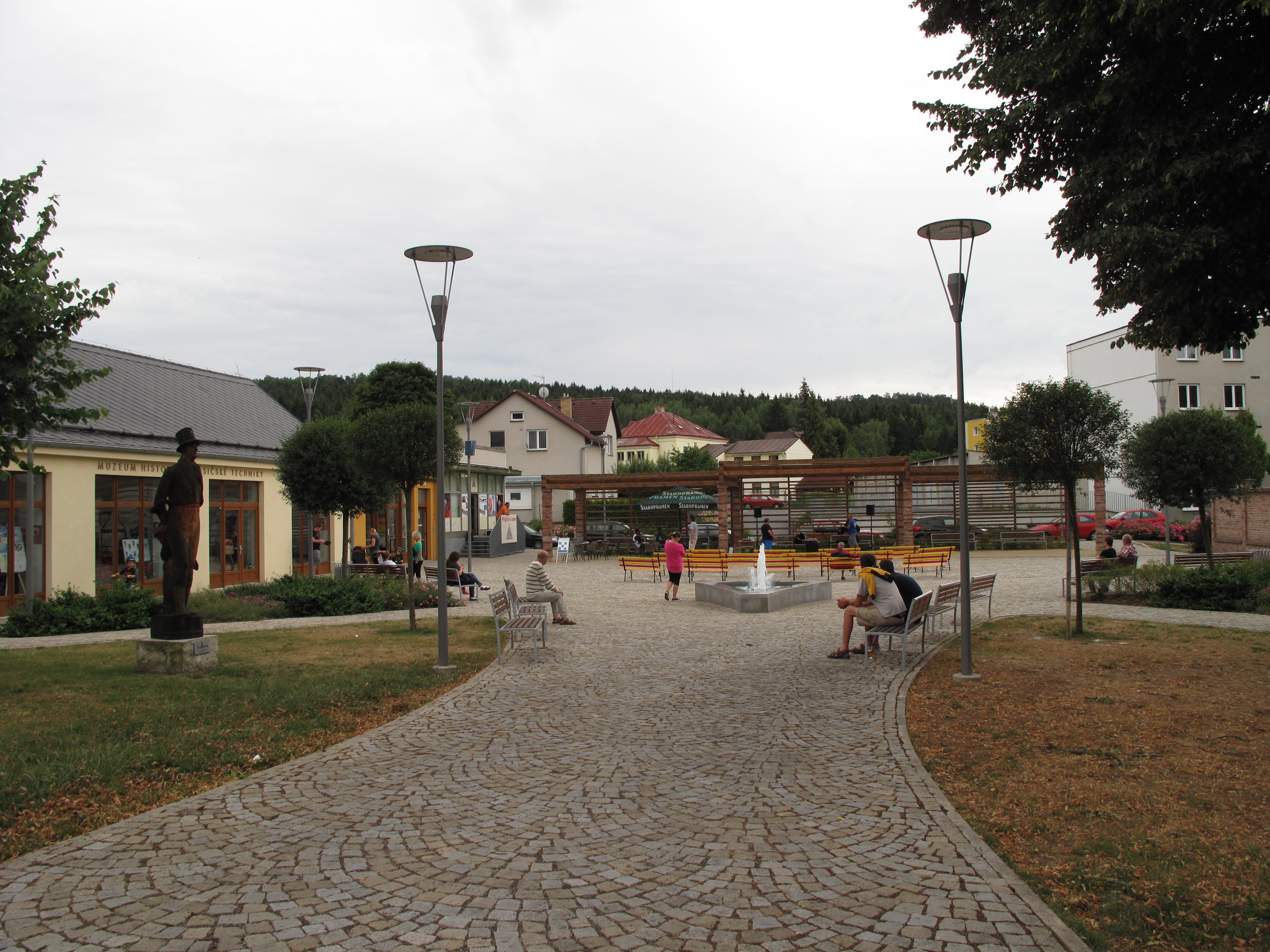
- Centre of Konstantinovy Lázně

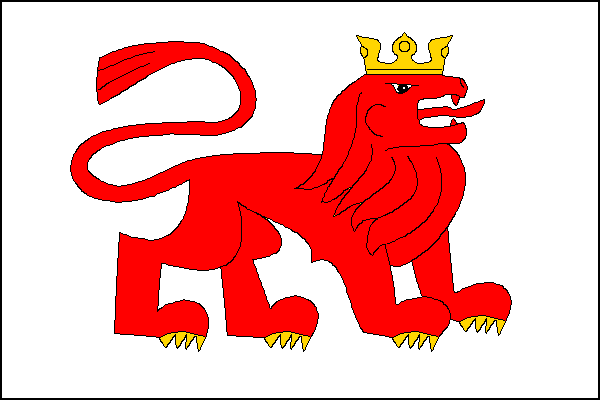
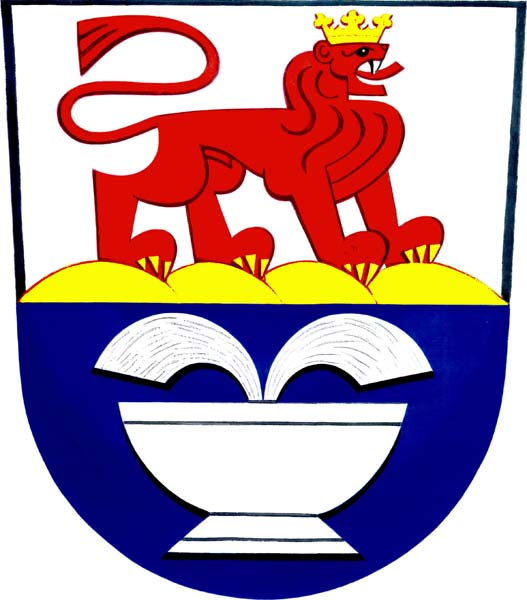
- Flag Coat of arms

- Location in the Czech Republic
- Coordinates: 49°52′48″N 12°58′34″E
- Country: Czech Republic
- Region: Plzeň
- District: Tachov
- Established: 1803

Area
  - Total: 23.83 km^{2} (9.20 sq mi)
- Elevation: 520 m (1,710 ft)

Population (2026-01-01)
  - Total: 908
  - Density: 38.1/km^{2} (98.7/sq mi)
- Time zone: UTC+1 (CET)
  - Summer (DST): UTC+2 (CEST)
- Postal code: 349 52
- Website: www.konst-lazne.cz

Konstantinovy Lázně (Czech pronunciation: [ˈkonstantɪnovɪ ˈlaːzɲɛ]; German: Konstantinsbad) is a spa municipality and village in Tachov District in the Plzeň Region of the Czech Republic. It has about 900 inhabitants. The municipality is located in the Plasy Uplands.

Konstantinovy Lázně was founded in 1803. The nearby area of the former gord Hradišťský vrch is one of the most significant archaeological sites in the Czech Republic and is protected as a national cultural monument.

== Administrative division ==
Konstantinovy Lázně consists of eight municipal parts (in brackets population according to the 2021 census):

- Konstantinovy Lázně (602)
- Břetislav (22)
- Dlouhé Hradiště (39)
- Nová Ves (35)
- Okrouhlé Hradiště (158)
- Poloučany (23)
- Potín (16)
- Šipín (0)

== Geography ==
Konstantinovy Lázně is located about 26 kilometres (16 mi) northeast of Tachov and 32 km (20 mi) northwest of Plzeň. It lies in the Plasy Uplands. The highest point is the hill Hradišťský kopec at 632 m (2,073 ft) above sea level. The stream Úterský potok flows through the eastern part of the municipal territory.

== History ==
Konstantinovy Lázně was established in 1803, when the spa was built, and is the youngest village in the region. However, it only became an independent municipality in 1924. Until World War II, Konstantinovy Lázně had German majority. After the war, the German-speaking people were expelled.

== Demographics ==
Historical population

Year	Pop.	±%
1869	1,152	—
1880	1,345	+16.8%
1890	1,441	+7.1%
1900	1,461	+1.4%
1910	1,541	+5.5%

Year	Pop.	±%
1921	1,644	+6.7%
1930	1,813	+10.3%
1950	1,155	−36.3%
1961	1,142	−1.1%
1970	1,080	−5.4%

Year	Pop.	±%
1980	1,122	+3.9%
1991	1,007	−10.2%
2001	950	−5.7%
2011	918	−3.4%
2021	895	−2.5%

Source: Censuses

== Spa ==
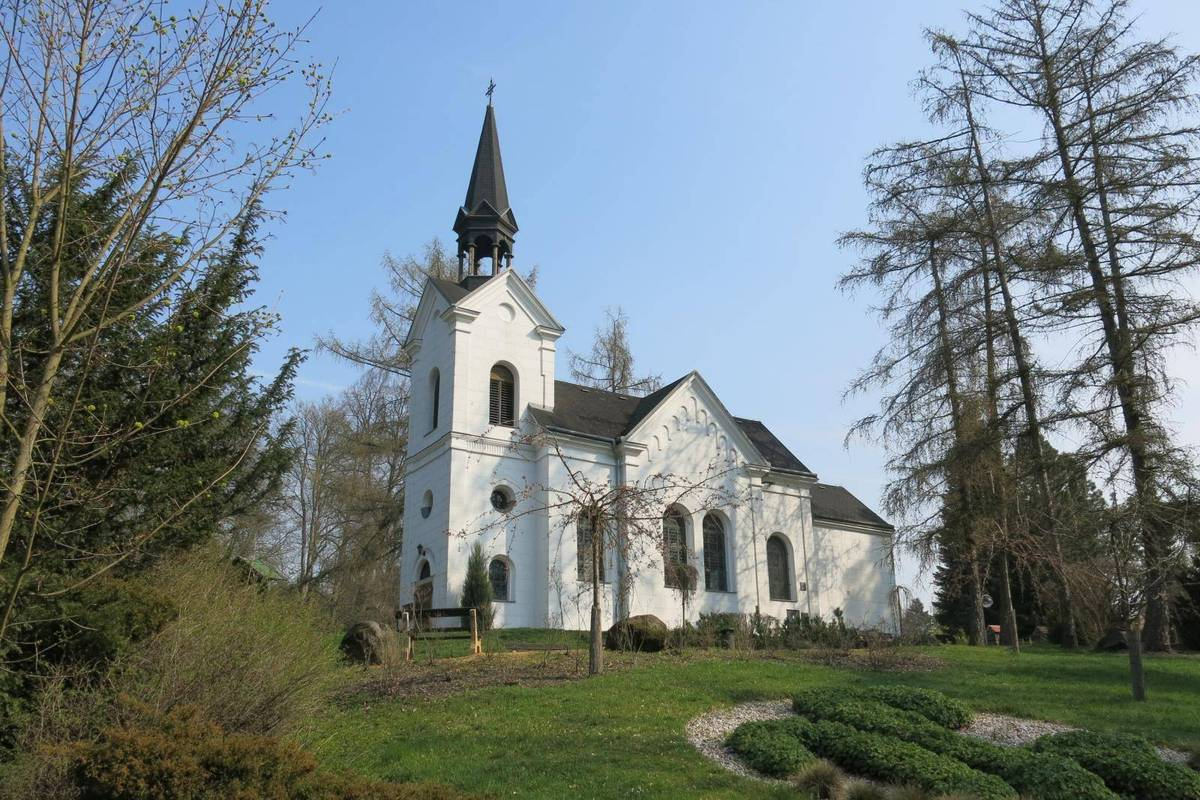
Church of Our Lady of Lourdes

The local spa focuses on the treatment of cardiovascular diseases and diseases of the musculoskeletal system. The clients of the spa are treated with balneotherapy. The Konstantinovy Lázně spring has the highest content of free carbon dioxide in the Czech Republic.

== Transport ==
Konstantinovy Lázně is located on the railway line Radnice–Bezdružice via Plzeň.

== Sights ==
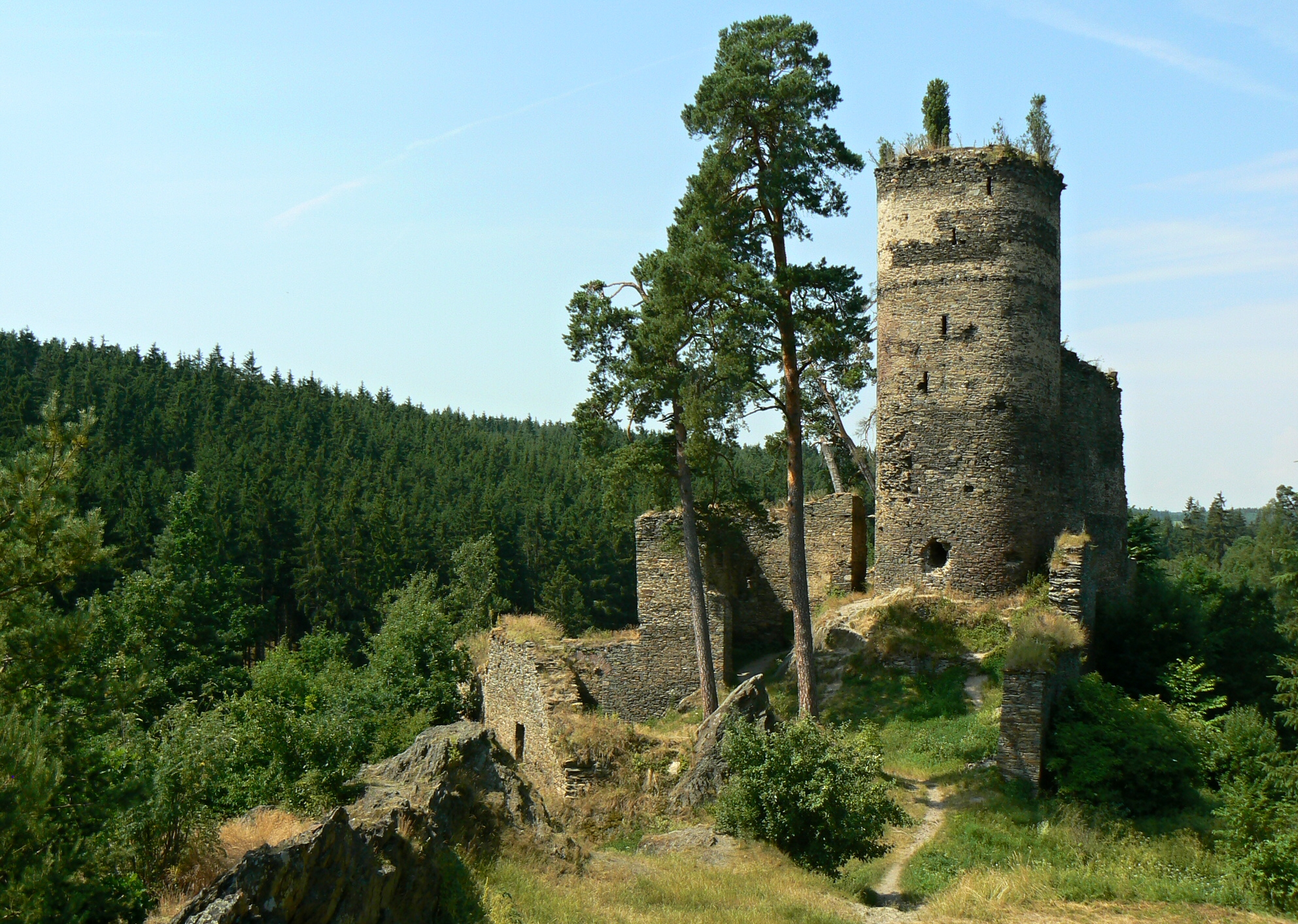
Gutštejn Castle

The main landmark of Konstantinovy Lázně is the Church of Our Lady of Lourdes. It was built in 1899 as a chapel. In 2000, it became a church.

The Church of the Nativity of Saint John the Baptist is located in Okrouhlé Hradiště. It was originally a medieval church, rebuilt in the Baroque style and then in the second half of the 19th century.

The Church of Saint Barbara is located in Šipín. The original church was built in the Gothic style in the 14th century, but at the beginning of the 18th century, it was in a desolate state. The current late Baroque church was built on its site in the second half of the 18th century. The tower was rebuilt in the Neo-Romanesque style in the mid-19th century.

The ruins of the Gutštejn Castle are located in the southern part of the municipal territory. It was founded in the early 14th century, but from the mid-16th century, it has uninhabited. A few walls and a bergfried have been preserved.

On the hill Hradišťský kopec is the gord Hradišťský vrch, dating from Late Bronze Age. It was once the second largest gord in western Bohemia. It is significant for its area of 50.1 ha (124 acres) and the density of archaeological finds. For its value, this archaeological site is protected as a national cultural monument.
