= Joe R. Hastings =

United States Army Medal of Honor recipient

Joe Ray Hastings
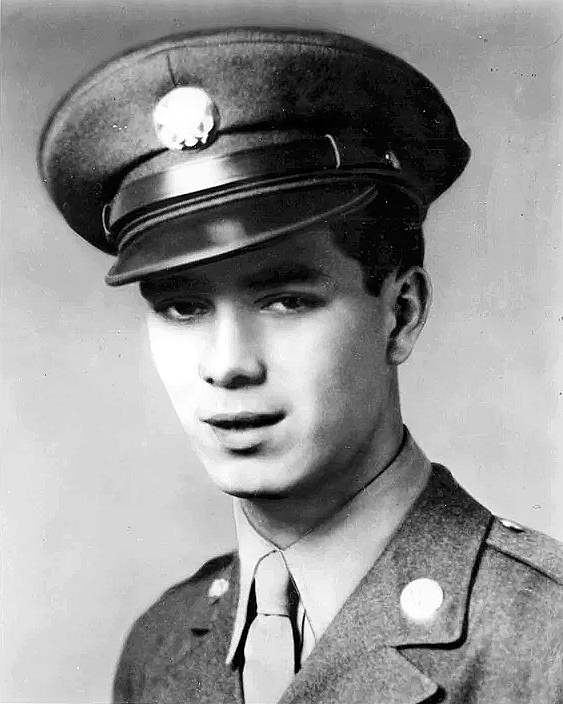
- Born: April 8, 1925; Malvern, Ohio, U.S.
- Died: April 16, 1945 (aged 20); Drabenderhöhe, Nazi Germany
- Burial place: Magnolia Cemetery, Magnolia, Ohio
- Military career
- Allegiance: United States of America
- Branch: United States Army
- Service years: 1943 - 1945
- Rank: Private First Class
- Units: 386th Infantry Regiment, 97th Infantry Division
- Conflicts: World War II
- Awards: Medal of Honor; Purple Heart

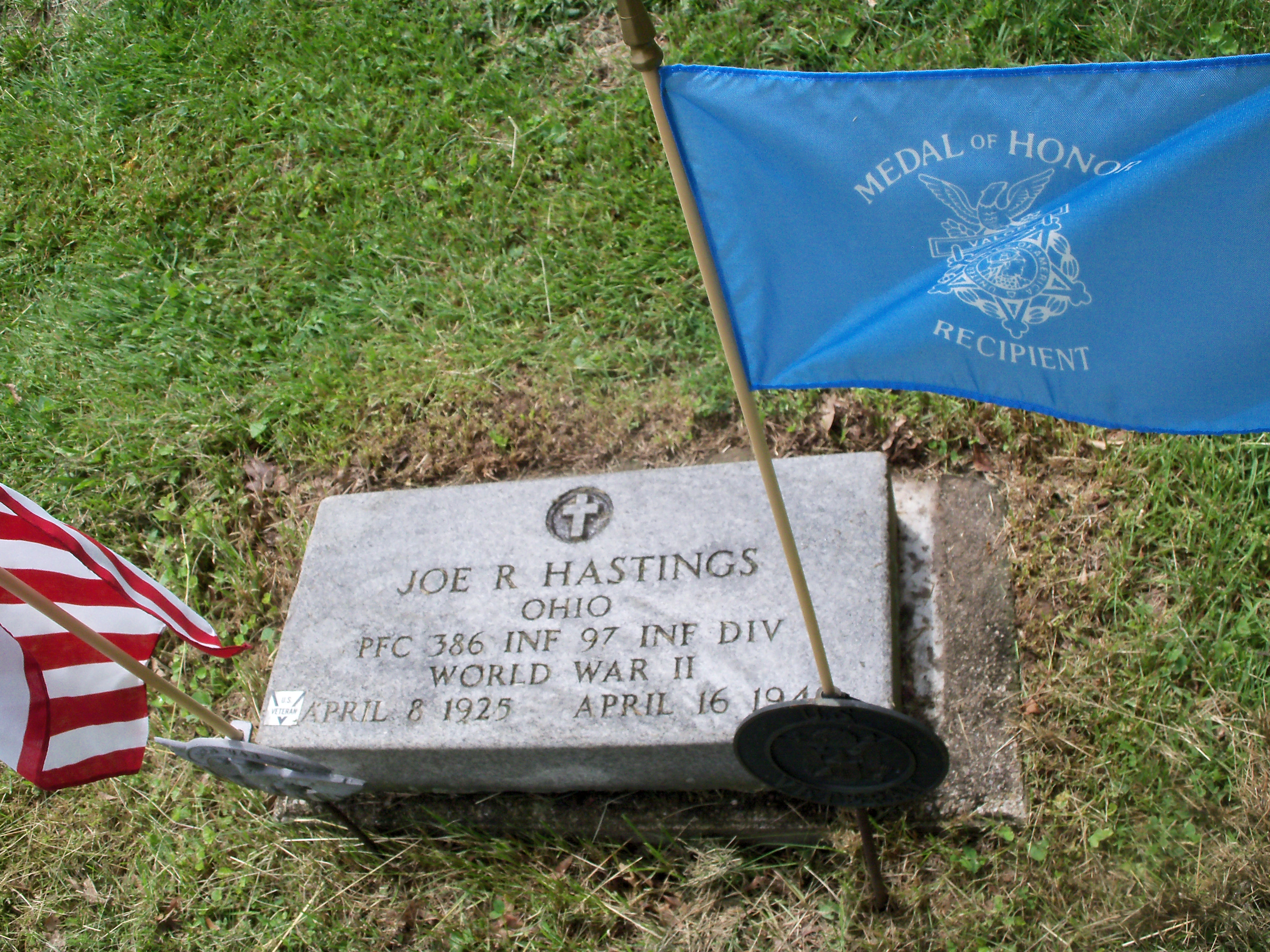
Joe R. Hastings headstone at Magnolia, Ohio

Joe Ray Hastings (April 8, 1925 – April 16, 1945) was a United States Army soldier and a recipient of the United States military's highest decoration—the Medal of Honor—for his actions in World War II.

== Biography ==
Hastings joined the Army from Magnolia, Ohio in July 1943, and by April 12, 1945, was serving as a private first class in Company C, 386th Infantry Regiment, 97th Infantry Division. On that day, in Drabenderhöhe, Germany, he repeatedly exposed himself to hostile fire in order to attack the enemy. He was killed in action four days later. For his actions at Drabenderhöhe, he was posthumously awarded the Medal of Honor on November 8, 1945.

Hastings, aged 20 at his death, was buried in Magnolia Cemetery, Magnolia, Ohio.

== Medal of Honor citation ==
Private First Class Hastings' official Medal of Honor citation reads:

He fought gallantly during an attack against strong enemy forces defending Drabenderhöhe, Germany, from the dug-in positions on commanding ground. As squad leader of a light machinegun section supporting the advance of the 1st and 3d Platoons, he braved direct rifle, machinegun, 20mm., and mortar fire, some of which repeatedly missed him only by inches, and rushed forward over 350 yards of open, rolling fields to reach a position from which he could fire on the enemy troops. From this vantage point he killed the crews of a 20mm. gun and a machinegun, drove several enemy riflemen from their positions, and so successfully shielded the 1st Platoon, that it had time to reorganize and remove its wounded to safety. Observing that the 3d Platoon to his right was being met by very heavy 40mm and machine gun fire, he ran 150 yards with his gun to the leading elements of that unit, where he killed the crew of the 40mm. gun. As spearhead of the 3d Platoon's attack, he advanced, firing his gun held at hip height, disregarding the bullets that whipped past him, until the assault had carried 175 yards to the objective. In this charge he and the riflemen he led killed or wounded many of the fanatical enemy and put 2 machineguns out of action. Pfc. Hastings, by his intrepidity, outstanding leadership, and unrelenting determination to wipe out the formidable German opposition, cleared the path for his company's advance into Drabenderhöhe. He was killed 4 days later while again supporting the 3d Platoon.

== Awards and decorations ==

Badge	Combat Infantryman Badge		
1st row	Medal of Honor		
2nd row	Bronze Star Medal	Purple Heart	Army Good Conduct Medal
3rd row	American Campaign Medal	European–African–Middle Eastern Campaign Medal with 1 campaign star	World War II Victory Medal

== Posthumous honors ==
The United States Army transport USAT Private Joe R. Hastings was named in his honor.

== See also ==
- List of Medal of Honor recipients
- List of Medal of Honor recipients for World War II
