= Reichszeugmeisterei =

Quartermaster's office of Nazi Germany

Coordinates: 48°6′6.5″N 11°35′0.8″E

The Reichszeugmeisterei (German: [ˈʁaɪçs.tsɔʏkmaɪstəˌʁaɪ]; RZM), formally located in Munich, was the first and eventually the primary Zeugmeisterei (quartermaster's office), as well as the national material control office of Nazi Germany. It replaced the SA-Wirtschaftsstelle, the purchasing agency of the Sturmabteilung.

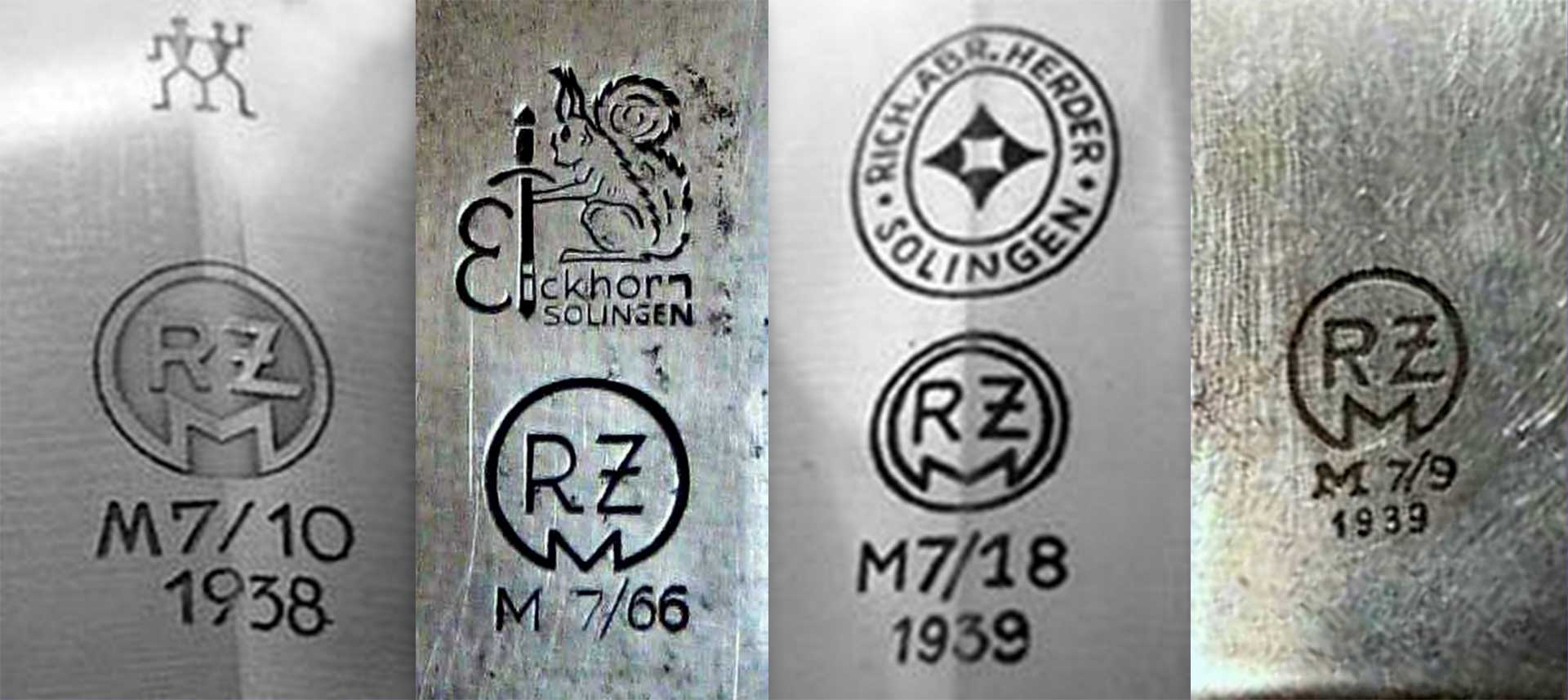
Hitler Youth knives and daggers marked with «RZM»

== Tasks and organization ==
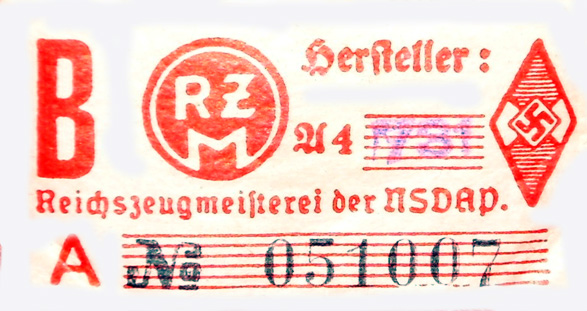
RZM label from a Hitler Youth armband

As early as 1925, to avoid identification problems during street fighting in the Weimar Republic, Adolf Hitler ordered the wearing of brown shirts by members of the newly established NSDAP and the SA. These uniforms were complemented by brown caps and coloured badges in 1927, which could only be purchased at the SA-Wirtschaftsstelle. Due to an increasing number of members, Hitler instructed the SA command in 1928 to establish a Zeugmeisterei in Munich. This office was responsible for the central supply of all kinds of uniforms, uniform parts and equipment to members of Nazi organizations. Further Zeugmeistereien were established in other German cities, and the quartermaster office in Munich was renamed to Reichszeugmeisterei, to identify it with its leading role.

In 1930 the Zeugmeistereien were subordinated to Franz Xaver Schwarz in his position as Reichsschatzmeister ("national treasurer") of the NSDAP. When the Heimtückegesetz ("insidiousness law") of 1934 secured its exclusive right to license manufacturers and tradesmen, the Reichszeugmeisterei became the Hauptamt VIII ("main office VIII") of the Beschaffungsamt der NSDAP ("NSDAP procurement office"), and given responsibility for the coordination of all procurement of uniforms and equipment projects. The RZM office defined design, manufacturing and quality standards, and published an authoritative colour chart for textiles. A RZM licence could be bought and by the middle of 1934 there were about 15,000 licensed manufacturing factories and craft producers, 1,500 tradesmen, 75,000 master tailors and 15,000 so-called "brown shops" in the German Reich.

All pieces of equipment had to be labelled with a visible RZM copyright protection symbol and a product-assigned RZM number that contained encoded data about the textile sector, material group, producer number and year of production. All products were at first tested by World War I veterans and invalids, but after the outbreak of World War II prisoners of war were used. Some equipment parts were also stored and shipped from the RZM in Munich.

== Office building ==
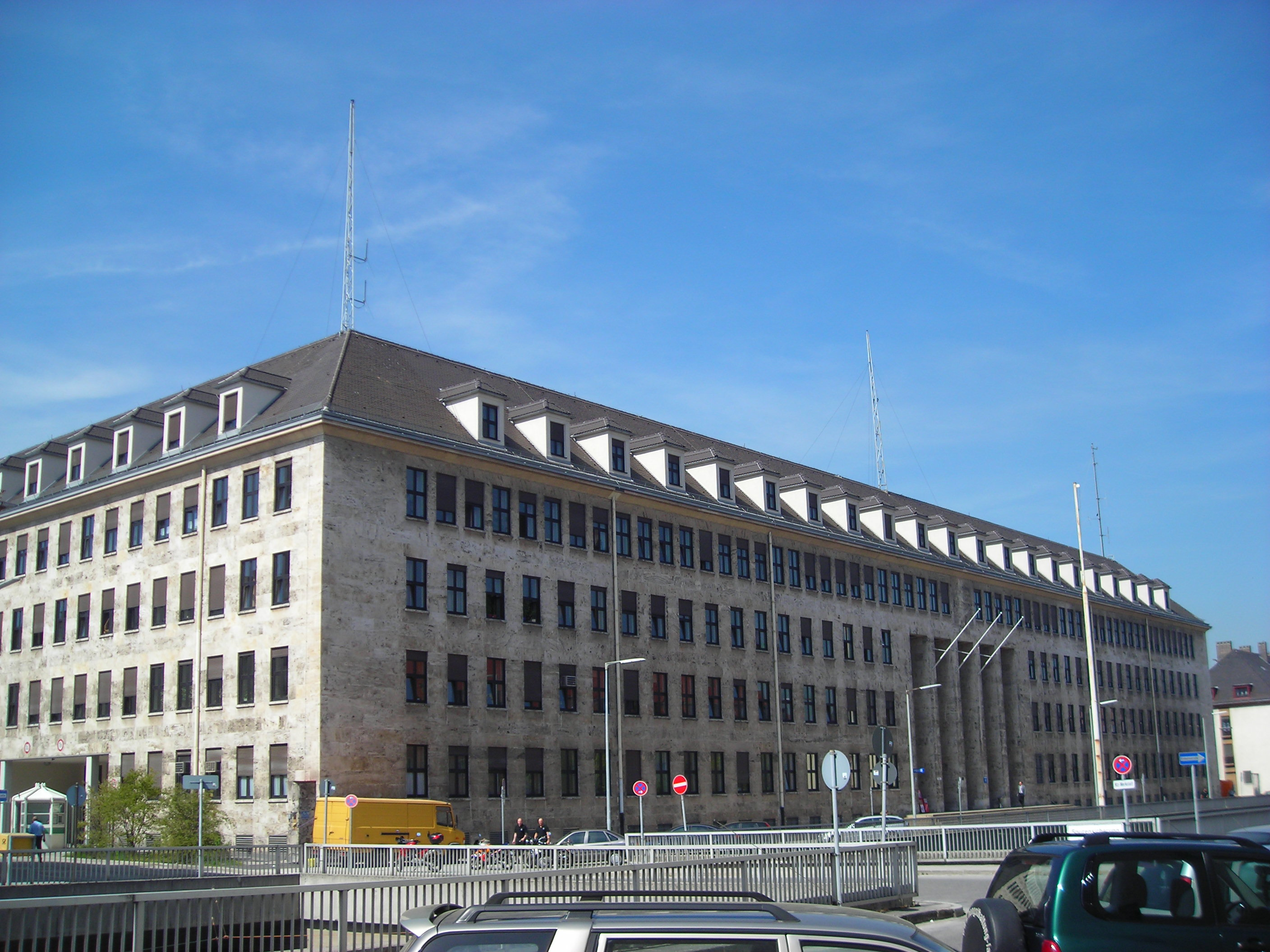
Building of the former RZM office in Munich

At first, before the RZM office building proper was finished, the RZM office was located in Schwanthaler Straße and later in offices of the former SA-Wirtschaftsstelle in Tegernseer Landstraße. The RZM building itself was built on the estate of the former Wagen- und Maschinenfabrik Gebr. Beißbarth OHG, which was acquired by the NSDAP from the Bayerische Hypotheken- und Wechselbank in 1934. Local architects Paul Hofer and Karl Johann Fischer were commissioned by the NSDAP Reichsleitung with the design of the RZM main building in the "new district" of Munich. Main construction management was overseen by Josef Heldmann. The huge construction was one of the first in Germany to be built using steel frame technology. Construction started in 1935 and the building was almost finished by 1937. It was surrounded by accommodation blocks for the RZM workers.

After World War II, United States forces occupied the complex, and the Reichsadler and the swastika were removed from the main building's façade. The main building became block no. 7 of the US-McGraw Kaserne. Since the withdrawal of US troops from Munich in the 1990s, the main building has been used by a satellite department of the Police Headquarters of Munich.
