= McGraw Kaserne =

Former military installation in Munich, Germany

Coordinates: 48°6′0″N 11°35′0″E

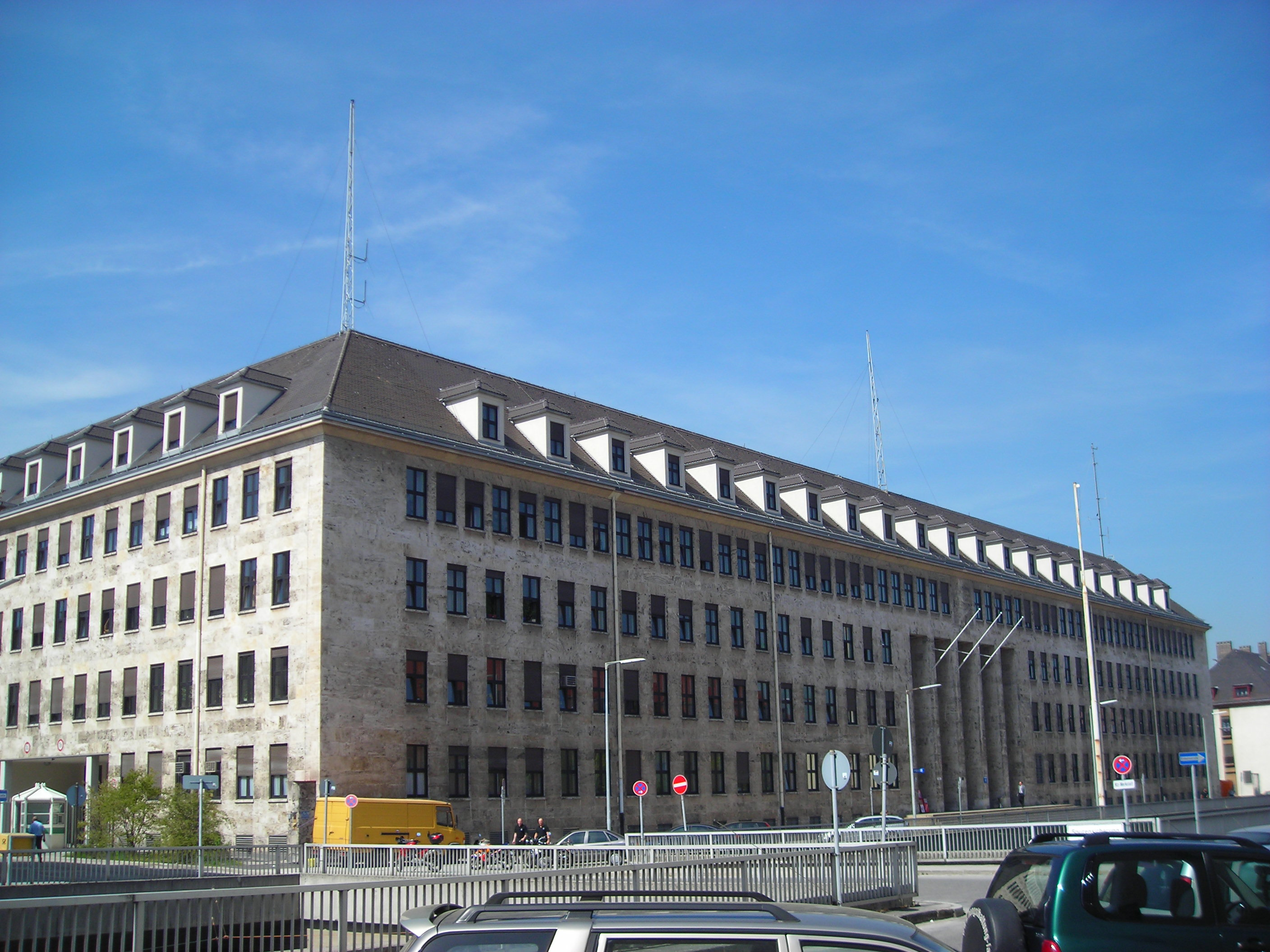
The former NS-Reichszeugmeisterei

The McGraw Kaserne is a former military installation in southern Munich, Germany, which was used by the U.S. Military during the occupation of Germany after World War II. The main building (building number 7; 110 m × 85 m and 18 m high) was one of the first ones in Germany to be built using steel frame technology. The kaserne was named after PFC Francis X. McGraw.

== History ==
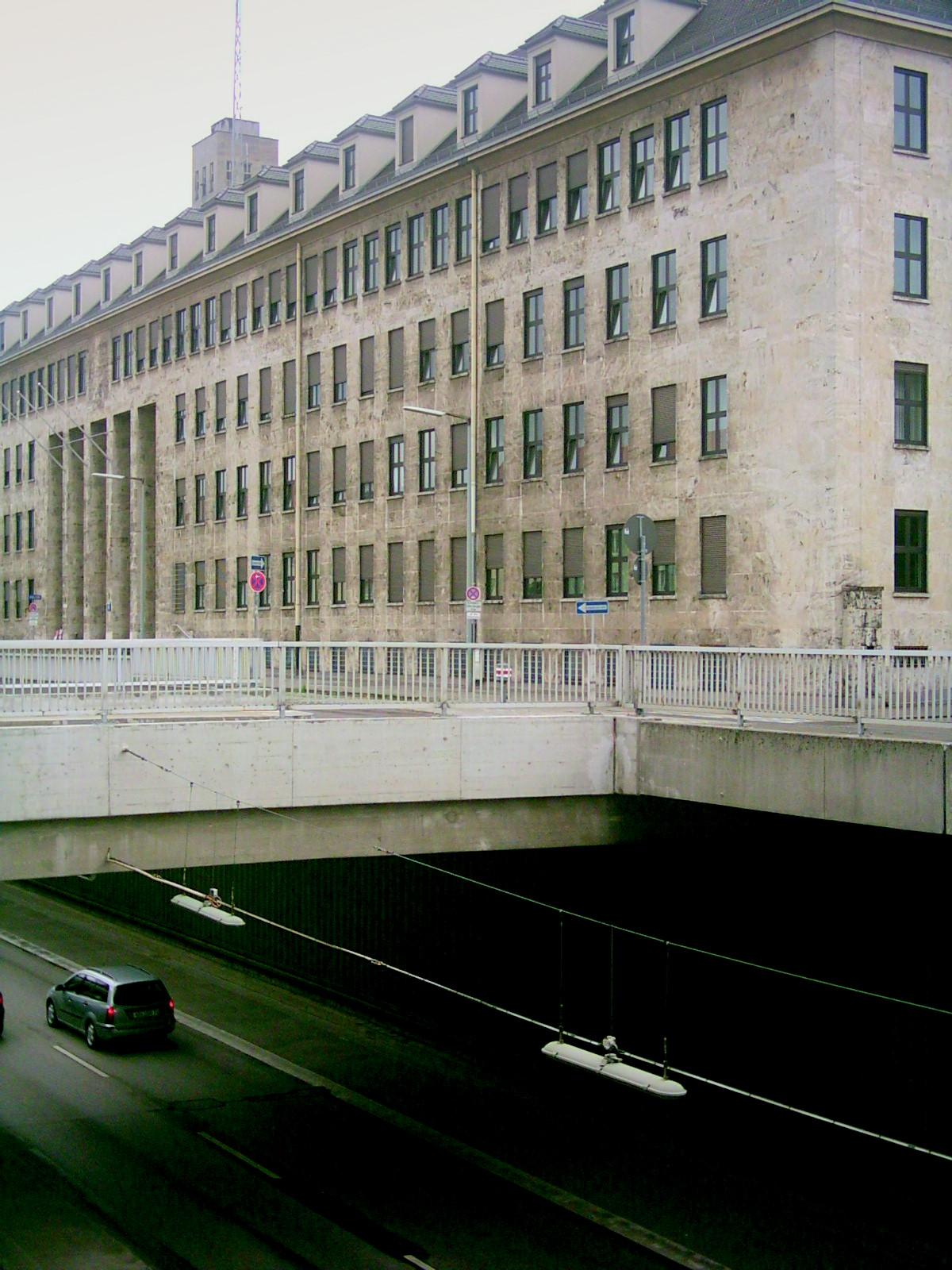
Main entrance of the former Reichszeugmeisterei

Earlier on the area of building number 7, the main building of the later Reichszeugmeisterei, was used by the Wagen- und Maschinenfabrik Gebr. Beißbarth OHG until 1931. In 1933, it was bought by the Bayerische Hypotheken- und Wechselbank.

It is also said, that a farm called Maechlerhof was located at the same place until 1910, which was bought by the Maurer Söhne company (founded in 1876) for its production.

=== NSDAP use ===
In 1934, the area was taken over by the NSDAP and was increased after 1935. The main building of the Reichszeugmeisterei (building number 7), the follow-on institution of the SA-Wirtschaftsstelle), was planned by the architects Paul Hofer and Karl Johann Fischer and was mostly completed in 1937. The area was used for the "Reichsautozug Deutschland" (Reichs automobile platoon) and the "Hilfszug Bayern" (auxiliary platoon Bavaria) car pools for the NSDAP central at the Brown House. The personnel was accommodated in number 6, 8, 10, 11, and 12. The Reichszeugmeisterei started its first activities in 1936. The "Reichsautozug Deutschland" was responsible for the technical support of mass events with loudspeaker systems and with its movie platoon. The "Hilfszug Bayern“ owned 160 vehicles for catering services at this mass events. The Reichszeugmeisterei was responsible for testing uniforms and ordnance, as well as for maintaining vehicles. This works were done by war veterans and war invalids, later also by prisoners of war. There were further units located on the area, e. g. an anti-aircraft battery and a small SS unit. During World War II the allied forces bombed only building number 19, because the area was not of strategic importance.

=== U.S. military use ===
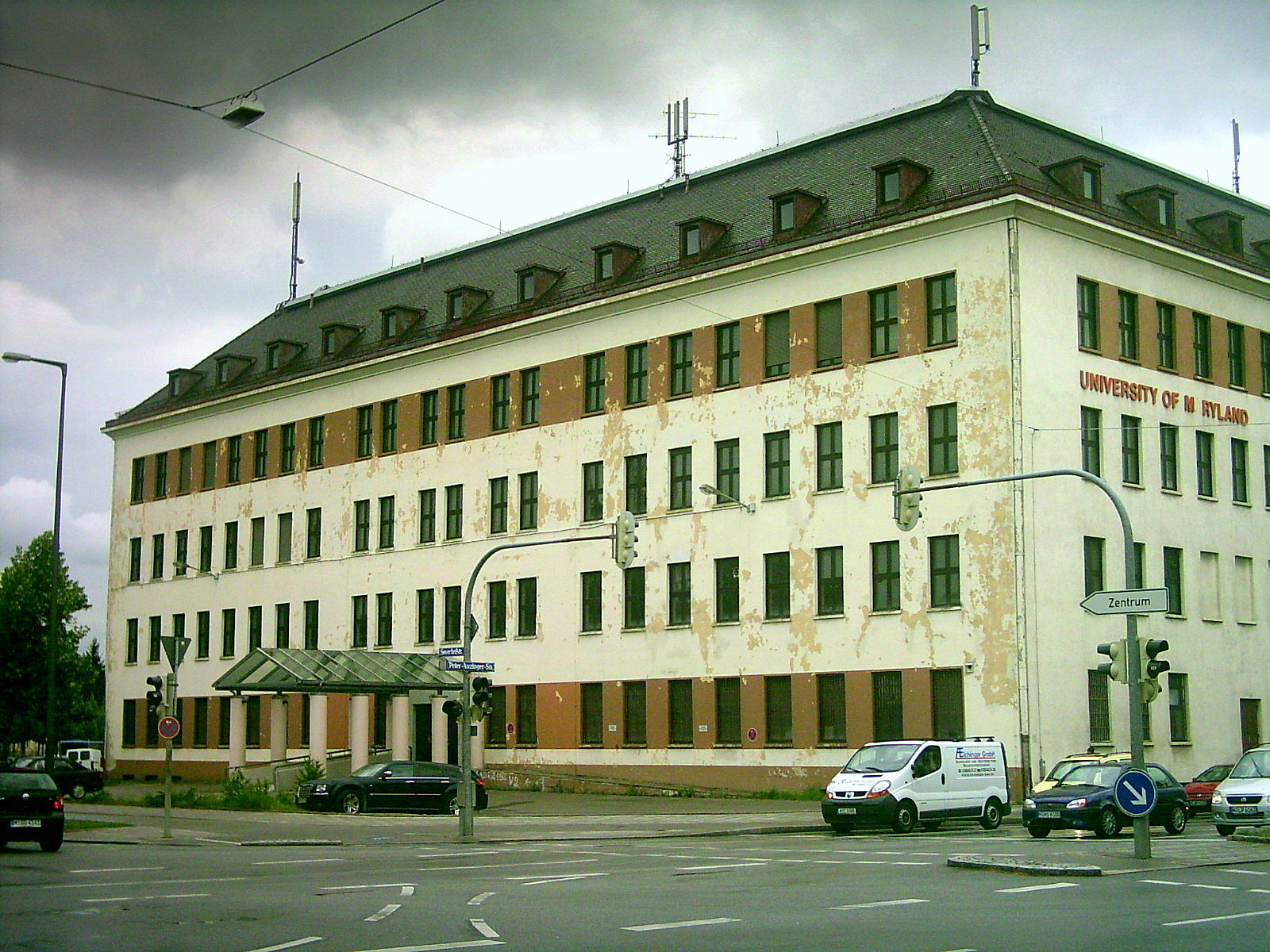
Building of the former U.S. Commissary and the former University of Maryland, Munich Campus

After the war, the area was occupied by U.S. troops on April 30, 1945, was renamed and further increased. Besides military units, there were many civilian installations for the soldiers' families located in the McGraw Kaserne, e. g. AAFES installations, the "Munich Community Club", a Commissary shop, a launderette, a gas station, a bowling alley, a dental clinic, a library, from 1950 the University of Maryland Munich campus, and others.

Building number 7 was used by the U.S. military government from 1945 to 1949, from 1952 until 1964 by the Munich branch of the Southern Area Command (SACOM), and from 1965 to 1967 by the U.S. Army Area Command (AACOM; predecessor of the U.S. Theater Army Area Support Command, Europe - USTASCOMEUR in Worms). In the end of 1968, the main building was shortly used by the unified 66th (from Stuttgart) and the 513th (from Oberursel) Military Intelligence Groups, which soon moved to building number 1, which was used earlier on by the 508th Military Police Battalion. In 1969 the HQ European Exchange System (renamed Army and Air Force Exchange Service, Europe in the 1970s) moved from the Nürnberg Palace of Justice into the main building of the McGraw Kaserne. McGraw Kaserne was the home of the 30th Army Band until 1967. During the 1970s and early '80s, McGraw Kaserne was the home to the Army Air Force Exchange Service (AAFES) and the 66th Military Intelligence Group.

Military family housing was primarily located about 2 km south, adjacent to Perlacher Forst.

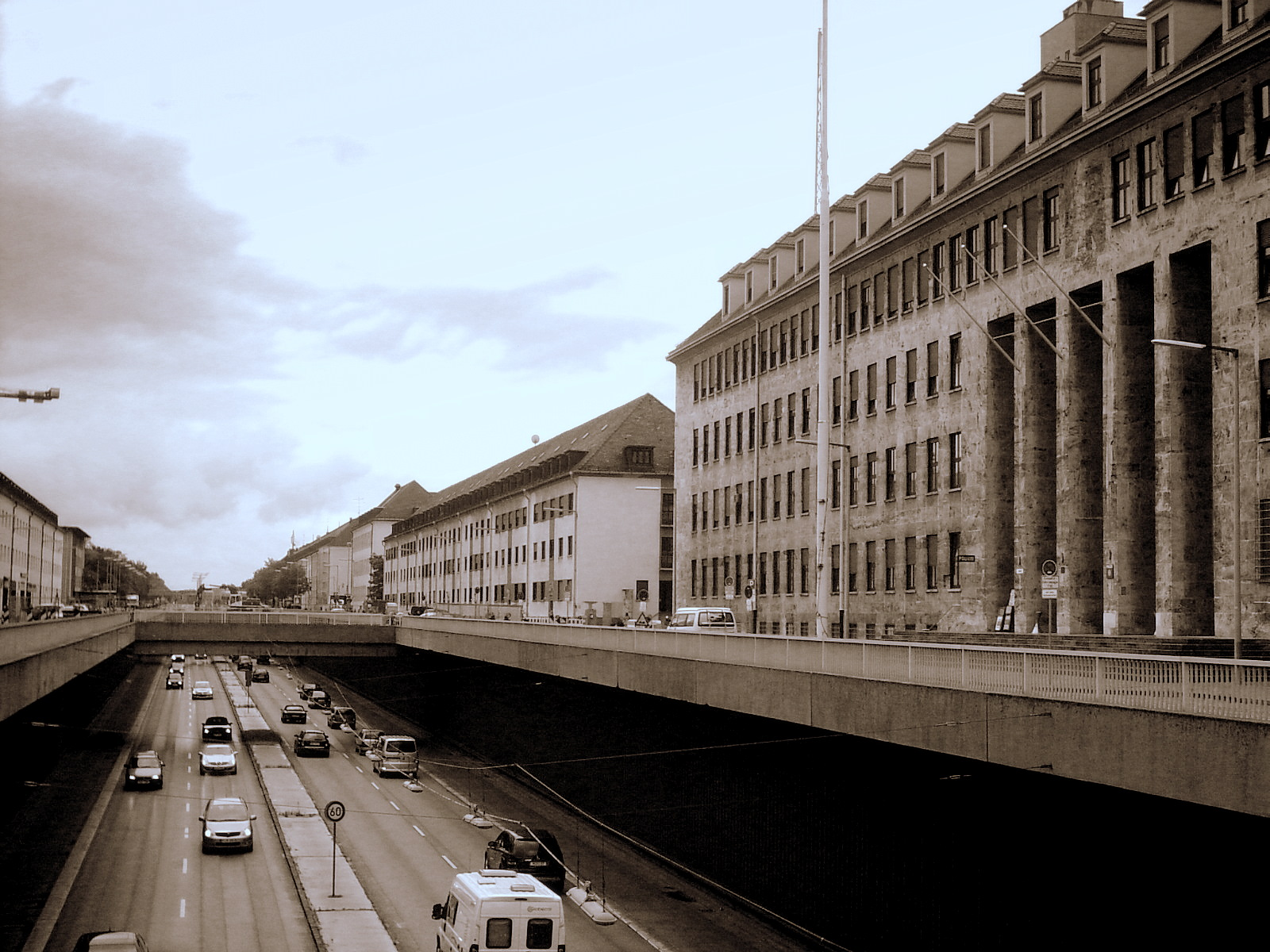
The "McGraw Trench" cuts through the former McGraw Kaserne

During the U.S. use, the connection of the Bundesautobahn 995 in the South and Tegernseer Landstraße (part of the Middle Ring Road of Munich) in the North of the area was cut. In 1970 it was reconnected by digging a half-open street trench of about 500 metres length. This part of Tegernseer Landstraße is called McGraw-Graben (McGraw trench).

In 1985, 1986, 1987, 1989 and 1992 the McGraw Kaserne was scene of the Bavarian Open Championships of Racquetball.

=== German subsequent use ===
After the U.S. forces left Munich in 1992 some offices of the local Bavarian Police moved into the McGraw Kaserne. Today building number 7 is used by a branch of the Police Headquarters of Munich. The police also use the garages of the former "Reichsautozug Deutschland" and the "Hilfszug Bayern".

The Munich Studentenwerk owns 50 apartments in the area and some of the renovated buildings are residential buildings now. The former machine hall is planned to be converted to a multifunctional hall. Some further buildings and the garage of the "Hilfszug Bayern" might be torn down.

Since 2015, the government of Oberbayern is using parts of the former McGraw Kaserne for hosting refugees ("Erstaufnahmeeinrichtung").

== Bibliography ==
- Willi Hanseder: Von der Reichszeugmeisterei zur McGraw-Kaserne, in Giesing / von Hildegard Adam ..., ed.: Thomas Guttmann, 1990. ISBN 3-927984-04-3 - pp. 181 – 196

== See also ==
- List of barracks in Munich
