= Sergeant Garcia =

Sergeant Garcia may refer to:

- Marcario García, American staff sergeant during World War II
- Sergeant Garcia, a fictional character in the Zorro franchise
- Sergent Garcia, French music project
