= Francis X. McGraw =

American Army soldier and Medal of Honor recipient

- Born: April 29, 1918; Philadelphia, Pennsylvania
- Died: November 19, 1944 (aged 26) near Schevenhütte, Germany
- Burial place: Henri-Chapelle American Cemetery, Henri-Chapelle, Belgium
- Military career
- Allegiance: United States of America
- Branch: United States Army
- Service years: 1942 - 1944
- Rank: Private First Class
- Units: 26th Infantry Regiment, 1st Infantry Division
- Conflicts: World War II: Battle of the Hurtgen Forest †
- Awards: Medal of Honor

Francis Xavier McGraw (April 29, 1918 – November 19, 1944) was a United States Army soldier and a recipient of the United States military's highest decoration, the Medal of Honor, for his actions during the Battle of Hürtgen Forest in World War II.

McGraw joined the Army from Camden, New Jersey, and by November 19, 1944, was serving as a private first class in Company H, 26th Infantry Regiment, 1st Infantry Division. At that time, the 26th Regiment was fighting in the Battle of Hurtgen Forest, a grueling dense-forest offensive near the German-Belgian border. During a German counterattack on that day, near Schevenhütte, Germany, he operated his machine gun despite intense enemy fire and left cover in order to retrieve more ammunition. Although wounded, he continued to fire his machine gun until again running out of ammunition. He then engaged the German troops with a carbine, but was subsequently killed. For these gallant actions, he was posthumously awarded the Medal of Honor on October 25, 1945.

McGraw, aged 26 at his death, was buried at the Henri-Chapelle American Cemetery in Henri-Chapelle, Belgium. The McGraw Kaserne in Munich has been named after him.

== Medal of Honor citation ==
Private First Class McGraw's official Medal of Honor citation reads:

He manned a heavy machine gun in a foxhole near Schevenhutte, Germany, on 19 November 1944, when the enemy launched a fierce counterattack. Braving an intense hour-long preparatory barrage, he maintained his stand and poured deadly accurate fire into the advancing foot troops, until they faltered and came to a halt. The hostile forces brought up a machine gun in an effort to dislodge him but were frustrated when he lifted his gun to an exposed but advantageous position atop a log, courageously stood up in his foxhole and knocked out the enemy weapon. A rocket blasted his gun from position, but he retrieved it and continued firing. He silenced a second machine gun and then made repeated trips over fire-swept terrain to replenish his ammunition supply. Wounded painfully in this dangerous task, he disregarded his injury and hurried back to his post, where his weapon was showered with mud when another rocket barely missed him. In the midst of the battle, with enemy troops taking advantage of his predicament to press forward, he calmly cleaned his gun, put it back into action and drove off the attackers. He continued to fire until his ammunition was expended, when, with a fierce desire to close with the enemy, he picked up a carbine, killed 1 enemy soldier, wounded another and engaged in a desperate firefight with a third until he was mortally wounded by a burst from a machine pistol. The extraordinary heroism and intrepidity displayed by Pvt. McGraw inspired his comrades to great efforts and was a major factor in repulsing the enemy attack.

== Honors ==
The United States Army Victory ship USAT Private Francis X. McGraw, which served from 7 June 1945 to 1 March 1950, and then also served the Military Sea Transportation Service (MSTS) USNS (T-AK-241) from 1 March 1950 until 8 May 1974, was named in his honor.

From 1945 to 1992, a military installation named McGraw Kaserne ("McGraw barracks") was located in Munich, Germany. A 500m long part of the Tegernseer Landstraße adjacent to the former McGraw barracks is named McGraw-Graben ("McGraw trench").

== See also ==
- List of Medal of Honor recipients
- Other Medal of Honor recipients for their actions in the Battle of Hürtgen Forest include Turney W. Leonard, Alfred B. Nietzel, George L. Mabry, John W. Minick, Pedro Cano, and Marcario García.
