= Alfred B. Nietzel =

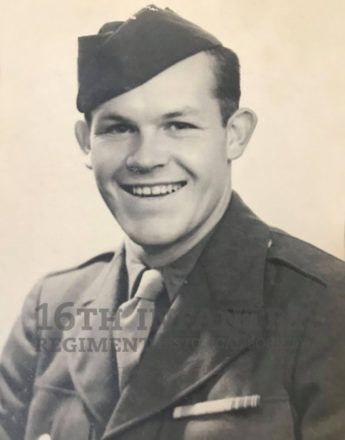
- Born: April 27, 1921; Fordham, Bronx, New York
- Died: November 18, 1944 (aged 23); Heistern, Germany
- Burial place: 1944-1949 Henri-Chapelle American Cemetery, Liège, Belgium; re-interred Long Island National Cemetery, Farmingdale, New York
- Military career
- Allegiance: United States of America
- Branch: United States Army
- Service years: 1940–1944
- Rank: Sergeant
- Units: Co. H, 2nd Battalion, 16th Infantry Regiment, 1st Infantry Division
- Conflicts: World War II
- Awards: Medal of Honor; Distinguished Service Cross (1945–2014); Bronze Star Medal; Purple Heart

Alfred B. Nietzel (April 27, 1921 – November 18, 1944) is a posthumous recipient of the US Medal of Honor. He was awarded the Medal of Honor by President Barack Obama in a March 18, 2014 ceremony in the White House. The award came through the Defense Authorization Act which in 2002, called for a review of Jewish American and Hispanic American veterans from World War II, the Korean War and the Vietnam War to ensure that no prejudice was shown to those deserving the Medal of Honor.

== Biography ==
Census records tend to indicate that Nietzel was born in Fordham, Bronx, New York on April 27, 1921, the first of three sons and second oldest child of Alfred C. Nietzel and Ruth Lawrence. The family may have fallen apart due to Nietzel's father's commitment to state mental institutions in Rockland and Orange County, where he died in 1971. In the 1930 census, Alfred and his brothers are in a foster home in Harrison, New York. By 1940, Alfred had left high school after two years and had been working as a machinist in Nassau County, Long Island. On October 5, 1940, he enlisted in the United States Army in Jamaica, Queens, New York.

It is not clearly known if Nietzel immediately joined the Army's 16th Infantry Regiment then posted in New York City at Fort Jay on Governors Island, or if he served in other units prior to November 1944.

By late November 1944, Nietzel was a sergeant in Company H, 16th Infantry Regiment, 1st Infantry Division, as U.S. First Army's move across France, Belgium and Germany had been in heavy, grueling, combat for nearly seven straight weeks since September.

Alfred died in combat during the Battle of Hürtgen Forest, along the Belgium-German border on November 18, 1944. The Hürtgen Forest battle was hard-fought, and the longest battle ever waged by the U.S. Army. The battle's heavy losses and questionable objectives were soon overshadowed by the desperate circumstances of the Battle of the Bulge a month later, leaving the Hürtgen Forest offensive largely forgotten.

In an intense day of fighting for a hill and the town of Heistern, Germany, several 16th Infantry soldiers were awarded the Silver Star and Distinguished Service Cross.

Nietzel's original 1945 Distinguished Service Cross citation noted that he selflessly covered the retreating members of his squad, which he had sent to the rear for reinforcements, laying down suppressive fire with his .30 caliber machine-gun on an enemy advance threatening to overrun his position. When his machine-gun ammunition was expended he fired his rifle until killed by an enemy grenade. His actions delayed the advance of the opposing force long enough for reinforcements to arrive and turn back the enemy.

The 2014 Medal of Honor citation further observed: "That afternoon, Sergeant Nietzel fought tenaciously to repel a vicious enemy attack against his unit. Sergeant Nietzel employed accurate, intense fire from his machine gun and successfully slowed the hostile advance. However, the overwhelming enemy force continued to press forward. Realizing he desperately needed reinforcements, Sergeant Nietzel ordered the three remaining members of his squad to return to the company command post and secure aid. He immediately turned his attention to covering their movement with his fire. After expending all his machine gun ammunition, Sergeant Nietzel began firing his rifle into the attacking ranks until he was killed by the explosion of an enemy grenade."

After his death, he was temporarily interred at the Henri-Chapelle American Cemetery and Memorial in Belgium and repatriated to the United States in 1949.

On April 19, 1949, a week before what would have been his 28th birthday, Nietzel was buried at the Long Island National Cemetery in Farmingdale, New York. On the same day and in the adjoining gravesite, his younger brother William Nietzel, a private in the Army Air Corps was also buried. William died of non-combat causes on April 6, 1944, at Horsham Airfield in Norwich, England.

== Honors and awards ==
In addition to Nietzel's original 1945 Distinguished Service Cross and his 2014 Medal of Honor, other awards and recognition for his war service included: Bronze Star Medal, Purple Heart, American Defense Service Medal, European-African-Middle Eastern Campaign Medal with one Bronze Service Star, World War II Victory Medal, Presidential Unit Citation and the Combat Infantryman Badge.

Badge	Combat Infantryman Badge		
1st row	Medal of Honor Upgraded from Distinguished Service Cross		Bronze Star Medal
2nd row	Purple Heart	Army Good Conduct Medal	American Defense Service Medal
3rd row	American Campaign Medal	European–African–Middle Eastern Campaign Medal with 1 Campaign star	World War II Victory Medal
Unit awards	Presidential Unit Citation		

== See also ==
Other Medal of Honor recipients for their actions in the Battle of Hürtgen Forest include Turney W. Leonard, Francis X. McGraw, George L. Mabry, John W. Minick, Pedro Cano, and Marcario García.
