= Tegernseer Landstraße =

Street in Munich, Germany

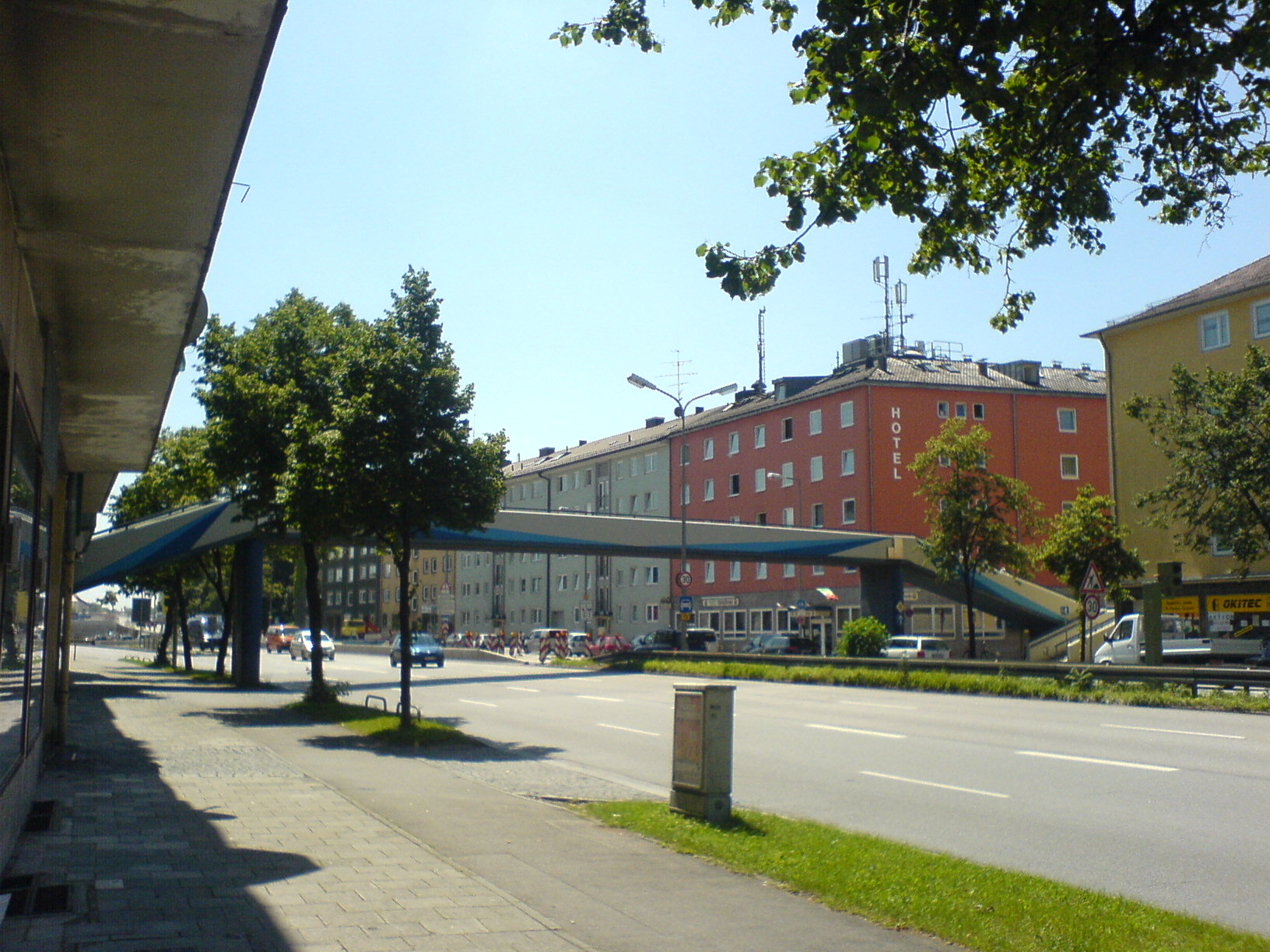
Pedestrian overpass at the Tegernseer Landstraße

The Tegernseer Landstraße (nicknamed TeLa) is a street in the Obergiesing borough of Munich, Germany, which runs in a southeastern direction and is a total of 4.6 kilometers long. It begins in the north as a straight extension of the Regerstraße, where it is a regular two-lane road until the Tegernseer Platz. At the Tegernseer Platz, a large branch of the Deutsche Post can be found. The building, nicknamed Tela-Post, was built in 1928 in the architectural style New Objectivity. The Hertie-store (which was for many years Karstadt), which was located at the Tegernseer Platz until the summer of 2009, was closed because of insolvency and demolished in 2010. Between 1976 and 2016, a branch of the city library was located across the street. There are efforts to strengthen the local economy and prevent vacancy of retail spaces around the Tegernseer Landstraße, which are funded by the federal government.

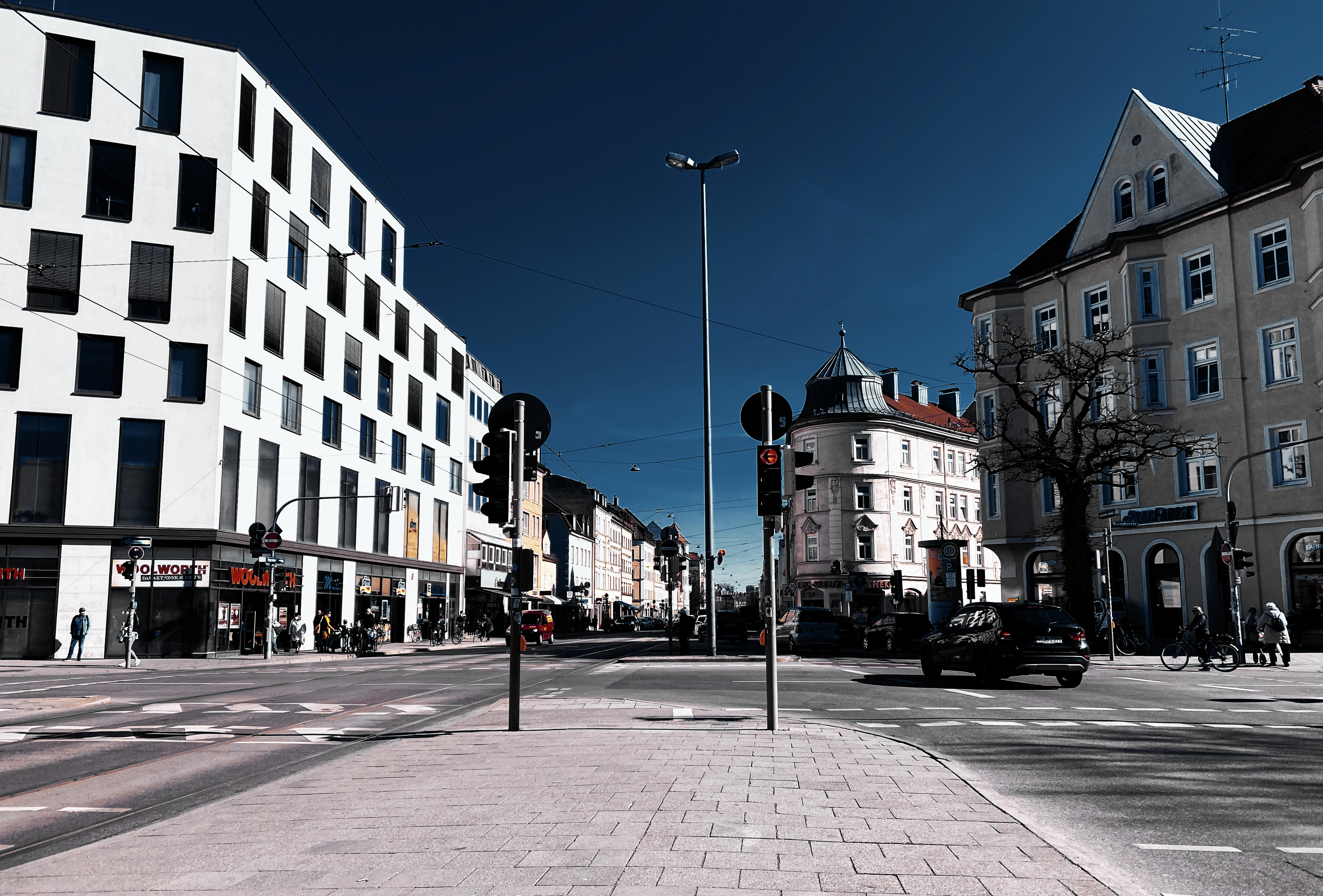
Tegernseer Platz

The stretch between Tegernseer Platz and Martin-Luther-Straße accommodates tram tracks, and the traffic is restricted to one-way traffic for motor vehicles and cyclists. Across from the intersection with Martin-Luther-Straße is Germany's first McDonald's branch which has been located there since 1971. Between Martin-Luther-Straße and Candidstraße, in the southern direction, the road consists of five lanes (two left-turning, two straight-ahead and one right-turning lane). At the intersection of Candidstraße, the Tegernseer Landstraße makes a 90-degree curve to the southeast, and straight ahead, the Grünwalder Straße begins.

The part of the road between the intersection with Candidstraße at the Grünwalder Stadion and the St. Quirin Platz, where the Chiemgaustraße branches off, is a part of the Mittlerer Ring and dedicated as the Bundesstraße B 2R; it is also part of Europastraße 54.

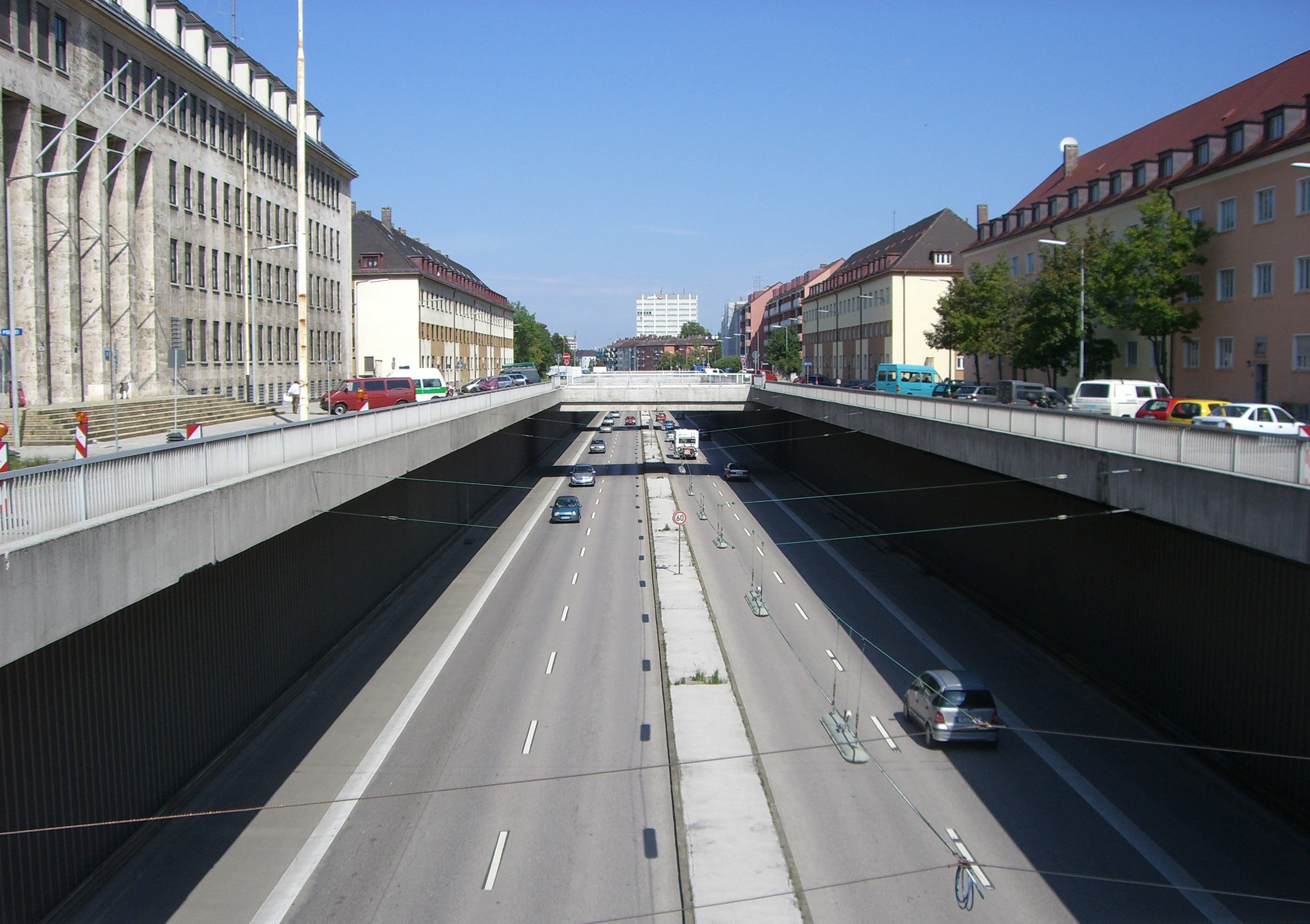
The McGraw trench facing the city center

The Tegernseer Landstraße leads, in a southeastern direction, also through the McGraw trench, a section on which the road is lowered down at a length of about 300 m. The upper section serves as a driveway for residents, not the through traffic, and allows a direct access to Stadelheimer Straße. In January 2018, the city council's CSU fraction proposed a cover over the McGraw trench in order to provide more space for the construction of apartments. Also, south of the Stadelheimer Straße junction, the upper and lower parts of the road join back together.

Above ground, in No. 210, was the former Reichszeugmeisterei of the SA/NSDAP, the successor institution of the NS-Wirtschaftsstelle located there since 1928/1929 in the barracks, which in the post-war period served the Americans under the name of McGraw-Kaserne. Today, a branch of the Munich Police Department is located there. The main building served as the administrative building of the United States Armed Forces (7th Army - USAREUR) from 1945 until 1992.

The road connects approximately 800 m after the intersection of Stadelheimer Straße at the level of Lincolnstraße/Münchner-Kindl-Weg to the Bundesautobahn 995.
