= USNS Private Francis X. McGraw =

Cargo ship of the United States Navy

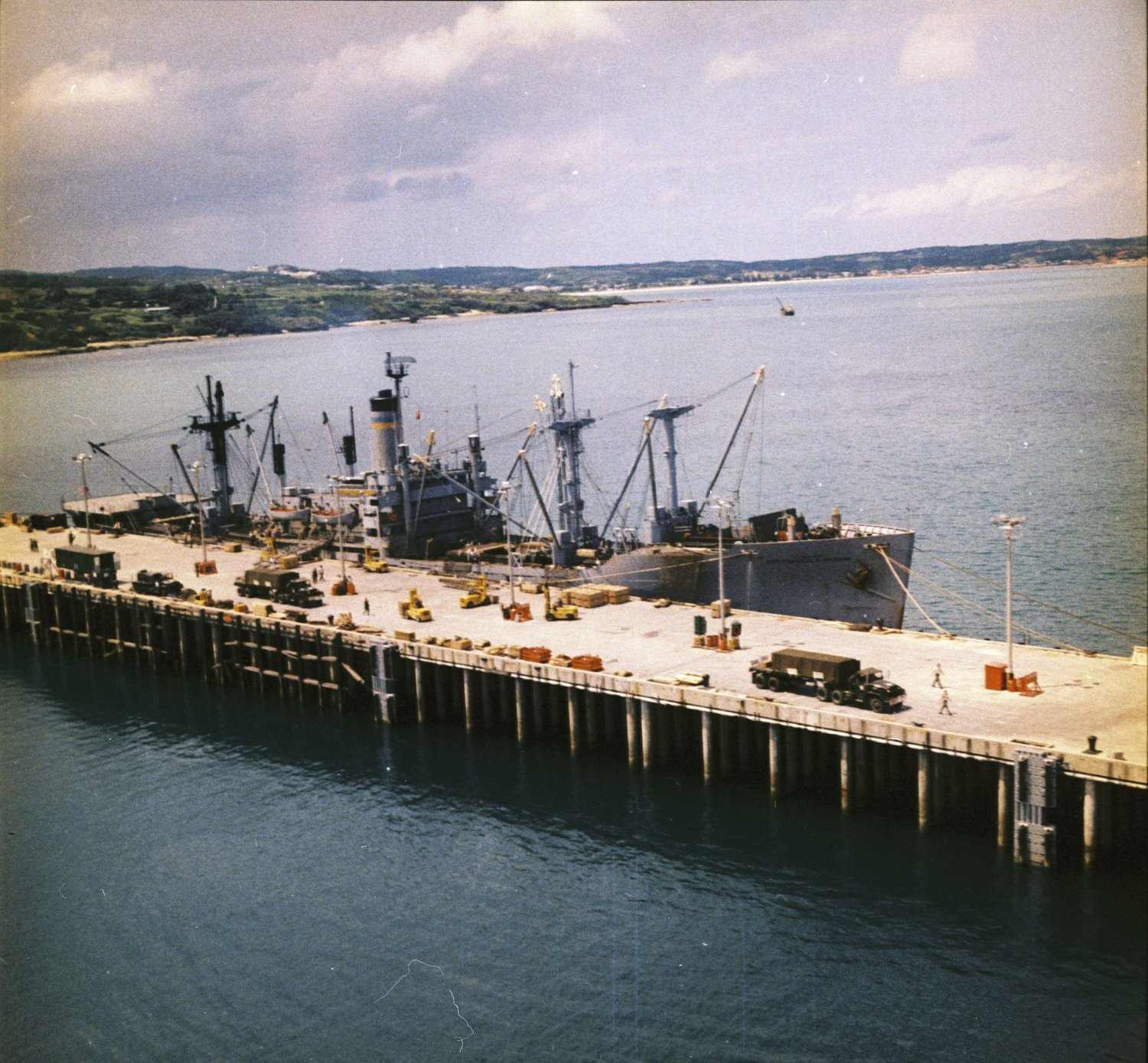
- USNS Pvt Francis X. McGraw (T-AK-241) loading chemical weapons at Tengan Pier, Okinawa during Operation Red Hat in September 1971. Operation Red Hat involved removing chemicals stored on Okinawa to Johnston Atoll.

History

United States
- Name: Wabash Victory; Private Francis X. McGraw (AK 241)
- Namesake: Wabash College; Francis X. McGraw, awarded the Medal of Honor
- Owner: War Shipping Administration, then 1950 U.S.Navy
- Operator: Interocean SS Co., then 1950 U.S.Navy
- Ordered: as type (VC2-S-AP2) hull, MCV hull 796
- Builder: California Shipbuilding Corporation, Los Angeles, California
- Laid down: 14 April 1945
- Launched: 9 June 1945
- Sponsored by: Mrs. A. Easterbrook
- Completed: 6 July 1945
- Acquired: by the US Army Transportation Service, 14 June 1946
- Decommissioned: 1 March 1950
- In service: 1 March 1950, as USNS Pvt Francis X. McGraw (T-AK-241)
- Out of service: date unknown
- Renamed: USAT Pvt Francis X. McGraw, 31 October 1947
- Stricken: date unknown
- Identification: Hull symbol:T-AK-241
- Honors and awards: Merchant Marine Pacific War Zone Medal; American Campaign Medal; Merchant Marine World War II Victory Medal; National Defense Service Medal (two awards)
- Fate: Sold for scrapping, 21 August 1974, to National Unity Marine Salvage Corp.

General characteristics
- Class & type: Boulder Victory-class cargo ship
- Displacement: 4,480 long tons (4,550 t) (standard); 15,580 long tons (15,830 t) (full load)
- Length: 455 ft (139 m)
- Beam: 62 ft (19 m)
- Draft: 29 ft 2 in (8.89 m)
- Installed power: 8,500 shp (6,300 kW)
- Propulsion: 1 × steam turbine; 1 × shaft
- Speed: 15.5 kn (17.8 mph; 28.7 km/h)
- Complement: 24 officers and enlisted
- Armament: none

USNS Private Francis X. McGraw (T-AK-241) was a Boulder Victory-class cargo ship built at the end of World War II and served the war and its demilitarization as a commercial cargo vessel. From 1946 to 1950 she served the U.S. Army as a transport named USAT Private Francis X. McGraw. In 1950 she was acquired by the United States Navy and assigned to the Military Sea Transportation Service. In 1974 she ended her career and was scrapped.

The ship was named for US Army soldier and Medal of Honor recipient Francis Xavier McGraw.

== Victory ship built in California ==
Private Francis X. McGraw was laid down as SS Wabash Victory (MCV hull 796) by the California Shipbuilding Corporation, Los Angeles, California; launched 6 September 1945; sponsored by Mrs. A. Easterbrook; and delivered to the U.S. Maritime Commission 7 June 1945.

== World War II-related commercial service ==
Operated by the Interocean Steamship Company under General Agency Agreement, Wabash Victory carried cargo and passengers to Eniwetok, Ulithi, and Okinawa and, from there, back to the U.S. West Coast between 8 August and 3 November 1945. Employed along the Oregon and California coasts for the next four months, she transited the Panama Canal in mid-March 1946, then headed across the Atlantic Ocean to France. On the 28th, she arrived at Le Havre to begin transporting men and equipment between Europe and the United States.

== U.S. Army service ==
Two and a half months later, on 14 June 1946, she was transferred to the U.S. War Department but continued her transatlantic runs as an Army transport. Renamed Private Francis X. McGraw, 31 October 1947, the Victory ship remained a unit of the Army Transportation Service until 1 March 1950.

== Service with the MSTS ==
The ship was returned to the U.S. Maritime Commission, she was simultaneously transferred to the Navy, given the designation T–AK–241, and assigned to the newly formed Military Sea Transportation Service (MSTS). Since that time, Private Francis X. McGraw, manned by a civil service crew, carried supplies and equipment to "far flung" ports for MSTS, Atlantic.

Although primarily rotated between Caribbean, North Sea, and Mediterranean runs, she was, when necessary, and particularly from the mid-1960s into 1970, been diverted from such assignments to carry cargo to Pacific Ocean ports. Pacific assignments included delivery of chemical weapons to Okinawa in 1965 and removing those weapons to Johnston Atoll in 1971 under Operation Red Hat. In 1964 the U.S.N.S. Private Francis X. McGraw was involved in the salvage efforts of the submarine U.S.S. Thresher.

== Decommissioning ==
The vessel was decommissioned and struck from the Navy List at unknown dates. She was transferred to the U.S. Maritime Administration on 8 May 1974 and was sold for scrapping on 21 August 1974.

== Honors and awards ==
- Merchant Marine Pacific War Zone Medal
- American Campaign Medal
- Merchant Marine World War II Victory Medal
- National Defense Service Medal (two awards)
