= Pedro Cano =

Mexican soldier and recipient of the Purple Heart medal

Private Pedro Cano
- Medal of Honor recipient Pvt Pedro Cano
- Born: June 19, 1920; La Morita, Nuevo León, Mexico
- Died: June 24, 1952 (aged 32); Pharr, Texas, U.S.
- Burial place: Hillcrest Memorial Park Cemetery, Edinburg, Texas
- Military career
- Allegiance: United States of America
- Branch: United States Army
- Rank: Private
- Units: 8th Infantry Regiment; 4th Infantry Division
- Conflicts: World War II: Western Allied invasion of France; Liberation of Paris; Battle of the Siegfried Line; Western Allied invasion of Germany; Battle of the Hürtgen Forest (WIA)
- Awards: Medal of Honor; Bronze Star (2); Purple Heart

Pedro Cano (June 19, 1920 – June 24, 1952) was a Mexican-American World War II veteran who received the Medal of Honor for his actions in combat near Schevenhütte, Germany in December 1944.

Cano was born in La Morita, Nuevo Leon, Mexico. He moved to the United States into the small community of Edinburg, Texas, when he was 2 months old. There he served as a farm laborer until he volunteered to serve in the Army during World War II. As a private, he was deployed to the European theater to serve with the 4th Infantry Division, where he engaged in battles both in France and in Germany. He exhibited extraordinary courage and valor in battle and later sustained injuries that left him permanently disabled. He returned to South Texas to join his wife and children and resumed his work as a farm laborer.

Private Cano received two Bronze Star medals, a Purple Heart, and a Distinguished Service Cross. On March 18, 2014, the Distinguished Service Cross was upgraded to the Medal of Honor.

After repeated requests during wartime to become a U.S. citizen and being ignored by his commanding officer due to other pressing matters, Cano finally achieved his longest-lasting ambition, to become an American citizen, in May 1946. He died six years later on June 24, 1952, at the age of 32 in a tragic automobile accident. He left a wife and three children.

== Early life ==
Cano as a young boy.

Pedro Cano was the child of Secundino Cano and Nicolasa Gonzalez Cano. He was born in La Morita, Nuevo Leon, Mexico on July 7, 1920. His family moved to the Rio Grande Valley when he was 2 months old. He grew up and worked as a farm laborer in Hidalgo County prior to joining the army. Very little is known about Cano's early life. However, it is known that he had a wife, Herminia Garza Cano, two daughters, Dominga and Maria, and a son, Susano.

== Military career ==
Pedro enlisted in the U.S. Army on November 28, 1942. He entered military service on April 28, 1943. His training was based in Fort Meade, Maryland. Pedro was assigned to the 4th Infantry Division, 8th Infantry Regiment, C Company. On January 18, 1944, Pedro left from New York Harbor for overseas duty and training. His destination was England, where he would continue his training. On June 6, 1944, Pedro's 8th Infantry Regiment took part in the initial assault on Utah Beach starting at H-Hour or 6:30 A.M. Company C (Pedro's company) led the way. Pedro took part in the Northern France Campaign and on September 14, 1944, the 4th Division attacked the Siegfried Line at Schnee Eifel after moving into Belgium through Houffalize. On November 6, 1944, the 4th Division reached the Hürtgen Forest where a lengthy battle would take place, that lasted until early December. It was during that struggle that Pedro etched his name in the annals of military valor.

On the 2nd of December, 1944 at 0800, Private Pedro Cano advanced with the assault elements of his Company C (1st Battalion) during an attack against strong German defenses in the Hürtgen Forest, near Schevenhutte, Germany. When his platoon was pinned down by two hostile machine guns covering a minefield, Cano, armed with a bazooka, ran through the intense machine gun fire to the right flank of his company. At this point, Company C had experienced 15 or more casualties. Although Cano had no knowledge of where the mines were planted or how dense the minefield was, he crawled twenty-five yards through this dangerous area over rough, thickly-wooded ground which afforded him little cover and scant visibility, and which was crisscrossed by deadly automatic fire. Cano crawled forward to a point within ten yards of the first enemy machine gun and fired his bazooka directly into the enemy emplacement, killing two gunners and five supporting riflemen. Private Cano then fired at the second German machine gun emplacement from the same position with his rifle, killing two more gunners and forcing five supporting riflemen to withdraw. His actions permitted Company C to advance. Meanwhile, Company K came abreast of Company C on the left flank and was pinned down by withering crossfire from two additional hostile machine guns. Private Cano, aware of Company K's difficulty, crossed his own company's front and, after determining the position of the German guns, approached them stealthily from the flank. He crept forward through Company K's zone of action until he reached a point fifteen yards from the hostile machine guns. Firing another round from his bazooka, Private Cano knocked out the gun and killed the two gunners. He then singlehandedly reloaded his bazooka, a function normally performed by an accompanying soldier, and fired at the second enemy machine gun from the same position, destroying the gun and killing two more gunners.

On the following day, December 3, at 0830, Private Pedro Cano's Company C jumped off in the attack and was pinned down in a wooded area by deadly crossfire from eight enemy machine guns. Private Cano, still armed with a bazooka, crawled forward in the face of this heavy fire over terrain which afforded him neither adequate cover nor visibility, to a position fifteen yards from the first gun. Private Cano fired a rocket at the first enemy machine gun, which destroyed the gun and killed two gunners. Private Cano then crept ten yards toward the second gun and, having reached a point fifteen yards from the weapon, again fired his rocket launcher. He destroyed the second machine gun, killed two gunners and again, single-handedly reloaded his weapon. Private Cano then crawled another fifteen yards through heavy rifle fire toward the third gun. Having reached a point twenty yards from the third enemy machine gun, he fired directly into it, destroying the gun and two gunners. Private Cano started back to Company C, but on his way he noticed a German soldier was taking two of their officers and a platoon sergeant prisoner. Cano aimed at the German with his rifle and fired, killing him.

== Military awards and Medal of Honor citation ==
Cano unceremoniously received the Distinguished Service Cross in the mail, which he put away in a closet after showing it to some of his friends. They recognized the significance of the medal and wrote to the Army that it had not been ceremonially pinned on his chest, as per custom. His community believed that his award deserved a formal military ceremony. They requested that the War Department provide the ceremony, with the award being presented by a general. American Legion posts in his community immediately began drafting messages to the Army's Eighth Service Command requesting a military ceremony for Cano. Allan Engleman, publisher of the Edinburg Review, wired senators and representatives to tell them of Cano's story. Colonel George R. Beane was in Edinburg, making an investigation of the "army blunder" in awarding the Distinguished Service Cross to Private Pedro Cano. Also investigating was Colonel John T. Morgan, Assistant Inspector General to the Eight Service Command in Dallas, Texas. Both officers said, "an unfortunate error had been made and the army is anxious to rectify it by offering a general officer to make the presentation." "I am not empowered to guarantee Gen. Jonathan Wainwright's presence, " Beane said. "I am not his aide but secretary to his general staff. After verifying the facts, which I have done to my complete satisfaction, I can only recommend that he attend."

Pedro Cano is pinned with Distinguished Service Cross medal by General Wainwright

General Jonathan M. Wainwright confirmed he would present the second highest Army award to Private Pedro Cano. Speaking extemporaneously, General Wainwright said the citation was one of the finest he had ever read, and that Cano should have possibly received, "a higher award (the Medal of Honor), but it is beyond my control." Admiral Joseph J. Clark, General J. Trinidad Rodriguez and Colonel J. Tiburcio Garza Zamorra of the Mexican Army were also present at the Pedro Cano Day ceremony on April 26, 1946, as were valley military heroes William G. Harrell, Luis N. Gonzalez, and Jose M. Lopez. The community held a parade. Schools dismissed students for the day. Approximately 4,000 people were in attendance.

Texas State Senator Rogers Kelley, learned of Cano's desire to become an American citizen. The senator began making arrangements for Cano's speedy naturalization. In addition, Cano was given 40 acres (160,000 m^{2}) of land and some accompanying farm equipment, and he returned to the farming life he'd left behind when he went to war.

The city of Edinburg named Cano Street after the war hero. Texas State Representative Aaron Peña sponsored H.R. 1427 to honor Cano during the 81st Legislative Session.

=== Military awards ===

1	Combat Infantryman Badge		
2	Medal of Honor		
3	Bronze Star Medal	Purple Heart	Army Good Conduct Medal
4	European-African-Middle Eastern Campaign Medal with one silver service star	World War II Victory Medal	Army of Occupation Medal with "Germany" clasp
5	Army Presidential Unit Citation		

- Belgian fourragere

== Citizenship ==
Being that Pedro Cano was born in La Morita, Nuevo Leon, Mexico, and then moved to Edinburg, Texas when he was two months old, his longest-lasting ambition was to become a United States citizen. Citizenship was, of course, no barrier to his serving his homeland, but he wanted to make it official. So it was that during the European campaign, Cano expressed his desire to become an American citizen to his commanding officer on several occasions, but he was rebuffed time and again because he was "in combat."

Thanks to the recognition Cano received upon returning home from Europe, State Senator Rogers Kelley got wind of Cano's lifelong ambition, and began the naturalization process. In May 1946 at the U.S. Federal District Court in Brownsville, Texas, Cano officially gained American citizenship, signing his naturalization documents in front of deputy district clerk Frances Hines. Unfortunately, his greatest desire satisfied, he only had six more years to live.

== Death and funeral ==
Cano's grave site

Those six years after returning from war were difficult for Pedro Cano. He suffered from what was at the time described as being "shell-shocked." Today, a better description would be showing symptoms of posttraumatic stress disorder. He was noted to be quiet and moody by a family member. He seemed nervous and took on heavy drinking. He had trouble sleeping and had anxiety attacks.

On June 24, 1952, at age 32, Pedro Cano died when the truck he was driving back to his home in Edinburg collided with an oncoming vehicle in Pharr, Texas. His children, Dominga, Maria, and Susano, were 9, 5, and 2 years old respectively. Cano's wife, Herminia died on Sunday October 30, 1975 at age 55. Susano never married and had no children. Dominga has four sons: Marcos, Salvador Jr, Roberto, and Armando; and two daughters: Esperanza and Rosalinda. Maria has four sons: Pedro, Joaquin Jr, Andres, and David.

The funeral service was held at the Sacred Heart Church in Edinburg Texas by Rev. Fr. Jerry Meagher. A squad of honor, assigned to that duty by Lieut. R. W. Byrd of Harlingen Air Field Base, guarded the body as it lay in state at the family home. A military truck of Co. I, 112th Armored Cavalry, transported the remains to Sacred Heart Catholic church for the services, and to the cemetery after Rev. Fr. Jerry Meagher had completed the service.

A detachment of Co. I, 112th Armored Cavalry of the Texas National Guard, provided an escort of honor and pallbearers included friends and former comrades—Joe Avila, S. M. Cardenas, Leonard Stewart, J. J. Poinboeuf, Louis Kroupa, Tom Simmons, Charles Flores and Ralph Hinojosa.

== Subsequent honors ==
Since that time a public elementary school (Cano-Gonzalez Elementary) in the city of Edinburg was named after him. Also the parade route (Kruttschnutt Street) upon which the celebration progressed on April 26, 1946, has been changed to Cano Street in his honor.

On April 21, 2009, the Texas House of Representatives passed House Resolution 1427 recognizing the life and sacrifice of Pedro Cano. In addition to this recognition, the Texas House of Representatives adjourned on that day in honor of Private Pedro Cano. The Speaker of the Texas House of Representatives presented the Speaker's gavel for presentation to the City of Edinburg in memory of the brave Private from South Texas.

On April 25, 2009, the City of Edinburg, in conjunction with the Office of Texas State Representative Aaron Peña, holds a Pedro Cano Day celebration reaffirming the life and sacrifice of Pedro Cano.

The Texas House of Representatives is further considering House Concurrent Resolution 5 to award the Texas Legislative Medal of Honor. This award is the highest award given by the State of Texas to a soldier who has distinguished himself in the service to his country.

On April 29, 2009, the Texas House Committee on Defense and Veterans Affairs unanimously passed House Concurrent Resolution 5.

On May 15, 2009, the Texas Legislative Medal of Honor Committee - composed of the Texas Adjutant General (General Jose Mayorga), the Texas Lieutenant Governor (David Dewhurst), the Speaker of the Texas House (Joe Straus), the chair of Veterans Affairs and Military Installations (Sen. Leticia Van De Putte), and the chair of Defense & Veterans Affairs (Chairman Frank Corte) - convened. After review, General Jose Mayorga made the motion for the nomination of Pedro Cano to be the Legislative Medal of Honor recipient for the 81st Legislative Session.

== The Texas Legislative Medal of Honor Ceremony ==
The City of Edinburg, Texas hosted a second ceremony for Pedro Cano 64 years later on May 18, 2010, at the municipal auditorium. Texas Governor Rick Perry personally presented the Texas Legislative Medal of Honor to the surviving family of Pedro Cano.

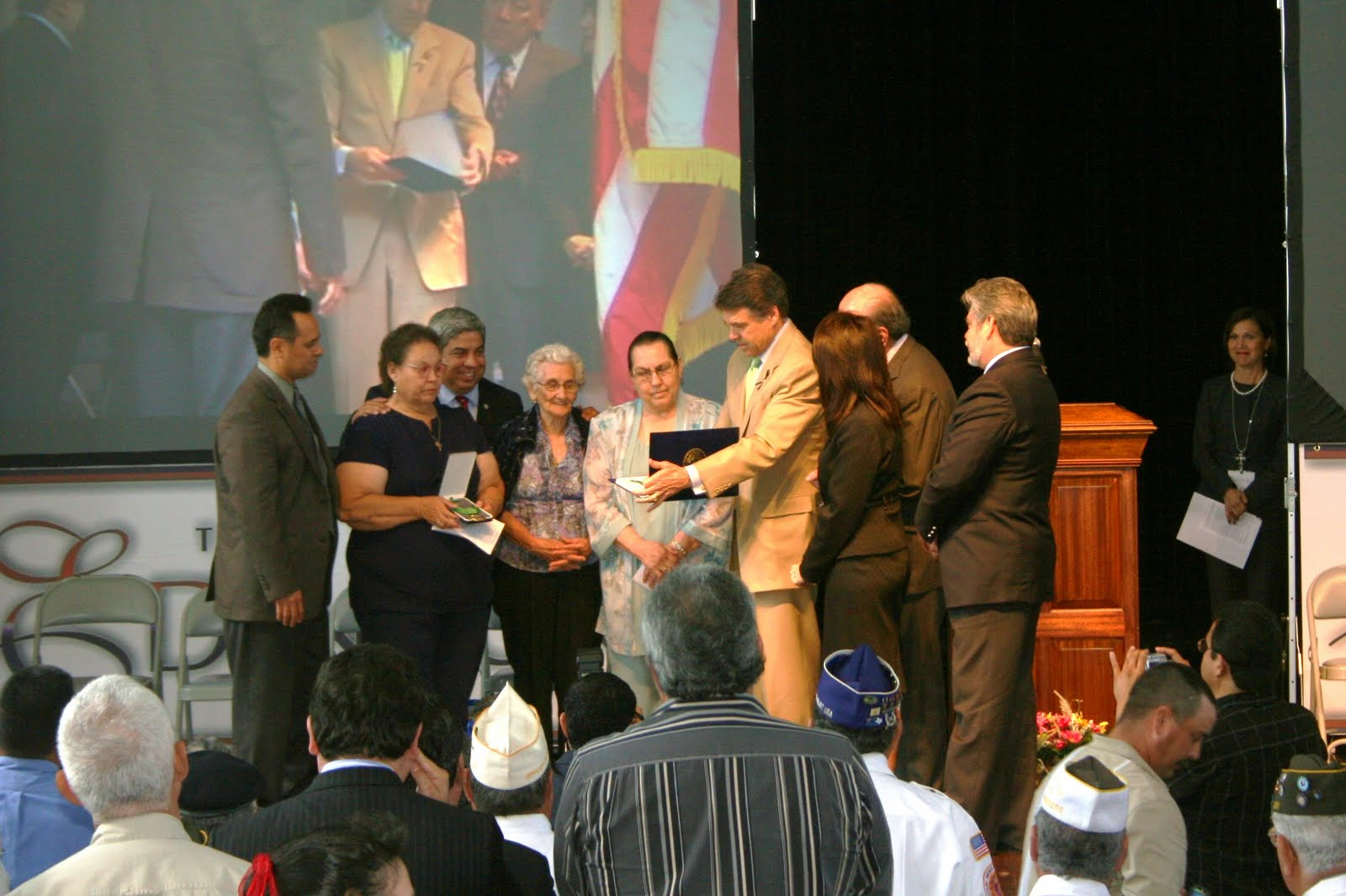
Gov. Rick Perry presents the Legislative Medal of Honor to the Cano family.

About 30 family members travelled to Edinburg from California to participate in the award ceremony. Amongst the family in attendance were Cano's sister, Alvina Cano Martinez, and his two daughters, Dominga Cano and Maria Cano.

The event began with the presentation of colors by the Hidalgo County Sheriff's Office Color Guard, followed by the Pledge of Allegiance by the Cano-Gonzalez Elementary School student council president. Edinburg Mayor, Richard Garcia, officially welcomed the Cano family and visiting dignitaries to the ceremony. The Mayor's welcome was followed by speeches from other elected officials, State Representatives Veronica Gonzales and Aaron Peña, and State Senator Juan "Chuy" Hinojosa. Governor Perry spoke to the Edinburg citizens in attendance before presenting the Texas Legislative Medal of Honor to the Cano family. After the presentation, Stephen Cano spoke a few words of appreciation on behalf of the Cano family and shared thoughts on Pedro's life and time in the military.

== 2002 Defense Authorization Act ==
In 2002, Congress through the Defense Authorization Act, called for a review of Jewish American and Hispanic American veteran war records from WWII, the Korean War and the Vietnam War, to ensure those deserving the Medal of Honor were not denied because of prejudice. In May 2013, Pedro Cano's family received a telephone call from President Obama informing the family that after almost 70 years, Private Pedro Cano had been selected to receive the Medal of Honor.

== Medal of Honor Ceremony ==
President Barack Obama posthumously bestowed the Medal of Honor upon Private Pedro Cano at a ceremony on March 18, 2014, in the East Room of the White House. Pedro's eldest daughter, Dominga, accepted the Medal of Honor for her father. Descendants of Pedro Cano joined other honorees' families at the White House ceremony. President Obama awarded the Medal of Honor to 24 Army veterans in recognition of their valor during major combat operations in World War II, the Korean War, and the Vietnam War. They were overlooked for the Medal of Honor due to their racial or ethnic backgrounds. The ceremony on March 18 followed a 12-year Pentagon review, ordered by Congress, of past discrimination in the military. "No nation is perfect," the President said at the ceremony. "But here in America we confront our imperfections and face a sometimes painful past, including the truth that some of these soldiers fought and died for a country that did not always see them as equal." Each soldier awarded on March 18, 2014, had been denied the Medal of Honor due to their Jewish, Hispanic or African American ethnicity. "So with each generation, we keep striving to live up to our ideals of freedom and equality and to recognize the dignity and patriotism of every person," President Obama said.

Other Medal of Honor recipients for their actions in the Battle of Hürtgen Forest include Turney W. Leonard, Alfred B. Nietzel, Francis X. McGraw, George L. Mabry, John W. Minick, and Marcario García.
