= Turney W. Leonard =

US army officer and Medal of Honor recipient (1921–1944)

Turney White Leonard
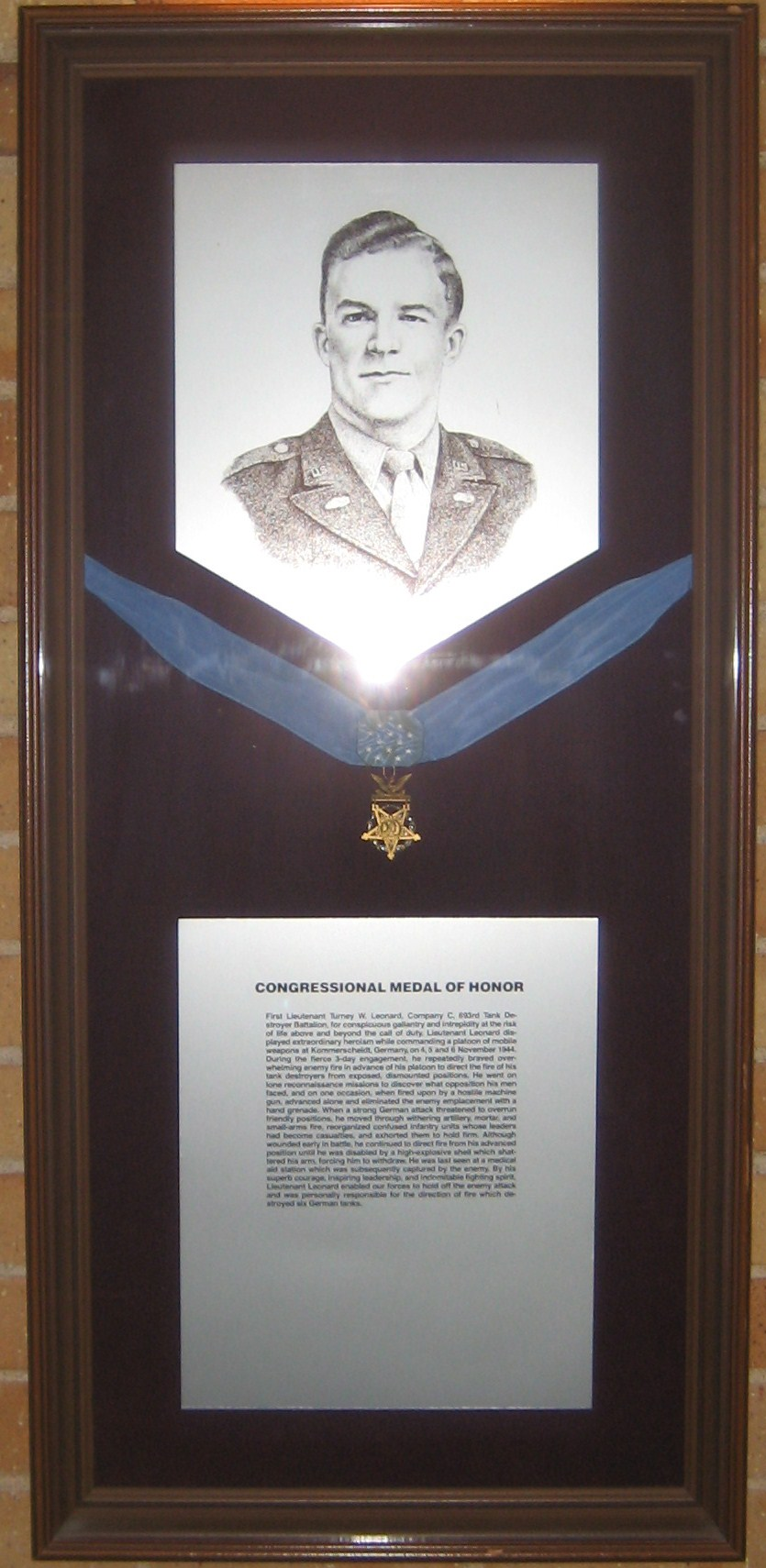
- Drawing of Turney White Leonard and a specimen Medal of Honor on display at Texas A&M University
- Born: June 18, 1921; Dallas, Texas, US
- Died: November 6, 1944 (aged 23); Kommerscheidt, Germany
- Military career
- Allegiance: United States
- Branch: United States Army
- Service years: 1942 – 1944
- Rank: First Lieutenant
- Unit: 893rd Tank Destroyer Battalion
- Conflicts: World War II • Battle of Hürtgen Forest
- Awards: Medal of Honor

Turney White Leonard (June 18, 1921 – November 6, 1944) was a United States Army officer who received the U.S. military's highest award, the Medal of Honor, for his actions in World War II.

== Biography ==
A native of Dallas, Texas, Leonard graduated from Dallas Technical High formerly Dallas High School, then Texas A&M University in 1942 with a bachelor's degree in agriculture. Commissioned in 1942 via the ROTC program at Texas A&M, Leonard was serving as a first lieutenant and platoon leader in Company C, 893rd Tank Destroyer Battalion, which was attached in October 1944 to support the 112th Infantry Regiment of the 28th Infantry Division during that unit's assault on the Siegfried Line through the Hürtgen Forest area along the German-Belgian border.

Between 4–6 November 1944, Leonard's company was heavily engaged in the fighting in and around the village of Kommerscheidt, west of Schmidt. Throughout the three days, he repeatedly exposed himself to hostile fire. When all officers of the infantry unit his platoon was supporting became incapacitated, Leonard assumed command. Already seriously wounded in the arm on the first day, he refused medical evacuation to remain with his troops. On 6 November, a mortar round severed the remainder of his arm, and forced him to report to the aid station. Leonard was left behind with the other seriously wounded in the hopes that the Germans, who were about to overrun the American positions, would provide medical care, but he ordered the medic to place him in a concealed foxhole with a weapon, explaining that he did not want to be taken prisoner. His remains were found after the War in a field grave dug by the Germans. On 1 September 1945, Leonard posthumously received the Medal of Honor.

== Medal of Honor citation ==
He displayed extraordinary heroism while commanding a platoon of mobile weapons at Kommerscheidt, Germany, on 4, 5, and 6 November 1944. During the fierce 3-day engagement, he repeatedly braved overwhelming enemy fire in advance of his platoon to direct the fire of his tank destroyer from exposed, dismounted positions. He went on lone reconnaissance missions to discover what opposition his men faced, and on 1 occasion, when fired upon by a hostile machinegun, advanced alone and eliminated the enemy emplacement with a hand grenade. When a strong German attack threatened to overrun friendly positions, he moved through withering artillery, mortar, and small arms fire, reorganized confused infantry units whose leaders had become casualties, and exhorted them to hold firm. Although wounded early in battle, he continued to direct fire from his advanced position until he was disabled by a high-explosive shell which shattered his arm, forcing him to withdraw. He was last seen at a medical aid station which was subsequently captured by the enemy. By his superb courage, inspiring leadership, and indomitable fighting spirit, 1st Lt. Leonard enabled our forces to hold off the enemy attack and was personally responsible for the direction of fire which destroyed 6 German tanks.

== Awards and decorations ==

1st row	Medal of Honor		Purple Heart
2nd row	American Campaign Medal	European–African–Middle Eastern Campaign Medal with one campaign star	World War II Victory Medal

== See also ==
- List of Medal of Honor recipients for World War II

Other Medal of Honor recipients for their actions in the Battle of Hürtgen Forest include Alfred B. Nietzel, Francis X. McGraw, George L. Mabry, John W. Minick, Pedro Cano, and Marcario García.
