= George L. Mabry Jr. =

United States Army general (1917–1990)

George Lafayette Mabry Jr.
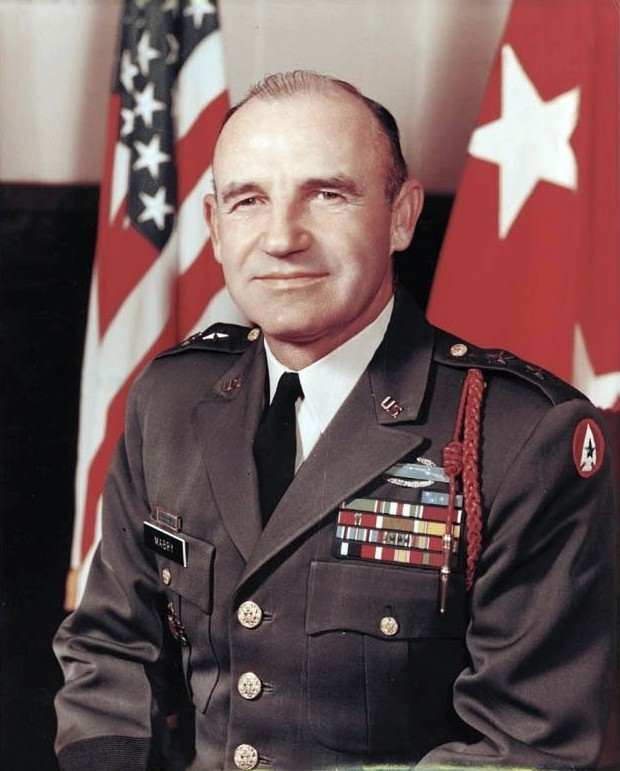
- Maj. Gen. George L. Mabry Jr., U.S. Army
- Born: September 14, 1917; Sumter, South Carolina, US
- Died: July 13, 1990 (aged 72); Stateburg, South Carolina, US
- Burial place: Holy Cross Episcopal Church, Stateburg, South Carolina
- Military career
- Allegiance: United States of America
- Branch: United States Army
- Service years: 1940 - 1975
- Rank: Major General
- Commands: United States Southern Command; 8th Infantry Division; 1st Armored Division; 2nd Battalion, 8th Infantry Regiment, 4th Infantry Division
- Conflicts: World War II; Invasion of Normandy; Battle of Hurtgen Forest; Vietnam War
- Awards: Medal of Honor; Distinguished Service Cross; Distinguished Service Medal; Silver Star; Legion of Merit; Bronze Star Medal w/ "V" Device; Purple Heart Combat Infantryman Badge

George Lafayette Mabry Jr. (September 14, 1917 – July 13, 1990) was a United States Army major general and a recipient of the United States military's highest decoration for valor—the Medal of Honor—for heroism above and beyond the call of duty on 20 November 1944, during the Battle of Hurtgen Forest in World War II.

== Biography ==
Mabry was a Hillcrest High School graduate (Dalzell, South Carolina) and a 1940 graduate of Presbyterian College in Clinton, South Carolina. Mabry majored in English and minored in psychology with hopes of becoming a teacher and coach. He played college baseball for four years and football for two years, was a member of Alpha Sigma Phi, and was a captain in the college ROTC corps.

Mabry joined the US Army at his birthplace of Sumter, South Carolina. On June 6, 1944, Mabry landed with the 4th Infantry Division on Utah Beach during the D-Day invasion of Normandy, France. After rapidly rising through the officer ranks, Mabry was a lieutenant colonel in the 2nd Battalion, 8th Infantry Regiment, 4th Infantry Division.

On November 20, 1944, while leading his battalion in the Hurtgen Forest near Schevenhütte, Germany, Mabry personally found a safe route through a minefield, led a group of scouts in the capture of three enemy bunkers, and then established an advantageous defensive position. For these actions, he was awarded the Medal of Honor the following year, in September 1945.

From 1954 to 1956, Mabry served as commander of the 31st Infantry Regiment in South Korea. After that, Mabry spent ten years serving with US forces in the Panama Canal Zone, with four years as commander. While in the Canal Zone, Mabry played a significant role in establishing the US Army Jungle Warfare Training Center at Fort Sherman.

Mabry was then promoted to major general and was assigned as commander of the 1st Armored Division at Fort Hood, Texas, from August to December 1965, and then as chief of the U.S. Army Evaluation Team (USAET) in Vietnam from January to April 1966. He then returned to command the 1st Armored Division at Fort Hood from May to July 1966, and then served as Commanding General of U.S. Army Combat Developments Command Experimentation Command at Fort Ord, California, from July 1966 to January 1968. He was then assigned as Commanding General of the 8th Infantry Division at Bad Kreuznach, West Germany, from January 1968 to April 1969. This assignment was followed by service as Chief of Staff for the Assistant Commanding General of U.S. Army Vietnam from April 1969 to September 1970.

Mabry's final posting was as Commander of the United States Southern Command at Fort Amador in Panama from December 1970 to December 1974 and then at Fort Sheridan, Illinois from January 1975 until his retirement on August 1, 1975.

Mabry died at age 72 of prostate cancer at Richland Memorial Hospital in Columbia, South Carolina. He was buried at Holy Cross Episcopal Church cemetery in Stateburg, South Carolina. Mabry had two sons, a daughter, and his wife Eulena.

On May 28, 1990, the Major General George L. Mabry Jr. Veterans Memorial Park was dedicated in Stateburg.

== Medal of Honor citation ==
Mabry's official Medal of Honor citation reads:

He was commanding the 2d Battalion, 8th Infantry, in an attack through the Hurtgen Forest near Schevenhutte, Germany, on 20 November 1944. During the early phases of the assault, the leading elements of his battalion were halted by a minefield and immobilized by heavy hostile fire. Advancing alone into the mined area, Col. Mabry established a safe route of passage. He then moved ahead of the foremost scouts, personally leading the attack, until confronted by a boobytrapped double concertina obstacle. With the assistance of the scouts, he disconnected the explosives and cut a path through the wire. Upon moving through the opening, he observed 3 enemy in foxholes whom he captured at bayonet point. Driving steadily forward he paced the assault against 3 log bunkers which housed mutually supported automatic weapons. Racing up a slope ahead of his men, he found the initial bunker deserted, then pushed on to the second where he was suddenly confronted by 9 onrushing enemy. Using the butt of his rifle, he felled 1 adversary and bayoneted a second, before his scouts came to his aid and assisted him in overcoming the others in hand-to-hand combat. Accompanied by the riflemen, he charged the third bunker under pointblank small arms fire and led the way into the fortification from which he prodded 6 enemy at bayonet point. Following the consolidation of this area, he led his battalion across 300 yards of fire-swept terrain to seize elevated ground upon which he established a defensive position which menaced the enemy on both flanks, and provided his regiment a firm foothold on the approach to the Cologne Plain. Col. Mabry's superlative courage, daring, and leadership in an operation of major importance exemplify the finest characteristics of the military service.

== Awards and decorations ==
Mabry's military decorations and awards include:

Badge	Combat Infantryman Badge		
1st row	Medal of Honor		Distinguished Service Cross
2nd row	Army Distinguished Service Medal	Silver Star	Legion of Merit with 2 Oak leaf clusters
3rd row	Bronze Star Medal with "V" Device and 1 Oak leaf cluster	Purple Heart	American Defense Service Medal
4th row	American Campaign Medal	European-African-Middle Eastern Campaign Medal with Arrowhead Device and 3 campaign stars	World War II Victory Medal
5th row	Army of Occupation Medal with 'Germany' clasp	National Defense Service Medal with 1 Oak leaf cluster	Vietnam Service Medal with 6 campaign stars
6th row	Korean Defense Service Medal	Republic of Vietnam Gallantry Cross with Palm	Vietnam Campaign Medal
Unit awards	Presidential Unit Citation	Korean Presidential Unit Citation	Republic of Vietnam Gallantry Cross Unit Citation with Palm

Distinguished Service Order
(United Kingdom)

== See also ==
- List of Medal of Honor recipients
- List of Medal of Honor recipients for World War II
- Other Medal of Honor recipients for their actions in the Battle of Hürtgen Forest include Turney W. Leonard, Alfred B. Nietzel, Francis X. McGraw, John W. Minick, Pedro Cano, and Marcario García.
