= John W. Minick =

John Wilson Minick
- Born: June 14, 1908; Wall, Pennsylvania, US
- Died: November 21, 1944 (aged 36) near Hurtgen, Germany
- Burial place: Westminster Cemetery; Carlisle, Pennsylvania
- Military career
- Allegiance: United States of America
- Branch: United States Army
- Service years: 1943–1944
- Rank: Staff Sergeant
- Units: 3rd Battalion, 121st Infantry Regiment, 8th Infantry Division
- Conflicts: World War II: Battle of Hurtgen Forest
- Awards: Medal of Honor

John Wilson Minick (June 14, 1908 – November 21, 1944) was a United States Army soldier and a recipient of the United States military's highest decoration, the Medal of Honor, for his actions during the Battle of Hürtgen Forest in World War II.

Minick was born in Wall, Pennsylvania, near East McKeesport in Allegheny County, to Anthony Fuhrman and Alma J. (Churchfield) Minick, whose patriarchal Pennsylvania Dutch ancestry can be traced back to the 1700s in Perry County, Pennsylvania.

Minick joined the Army from Carlisle, Pennsylvania in August 1943, and by November 21, 1944, was serving as a staff sergeant in Company I, 121st Infantry Regiment, 8th Infantry Division. On that day, inside German defenses of Hürtgen and Vossenack, Germany, Minick voluntarily led a small group of men through a minefield, single-handedly silenced two enemy machine gun emplacements, and engaged a company-sized force of German soldiers before he was killed while crossing a second minefield. For these actions, he was posthumously awarded the Medal of Honor in 1948.

Minick, aged 36 at his death, was buried at Westminster Cemetery in Carlisle, Pennsylvania.

== Medal of Honor citation ==
Staff Sergeant Minick's official Medal of Honor citation reads:

He displayed conspicuous gallantry and intrepidity at the risk of his own life, above and beyond the call of duty, in action involving actual conflict with the enemy on 21 November 1944, near Hurtgen, Germany. S/Sgt. Minick's battalion was halted in its advance by extensive minefields, exposing troops to heavy concentrations of enemy artillery and mortar fire. Further delay in the advance would result in numerous casualties and a movement through the minefield was essential. Voluntarily, S/Sgt. Minick led 4 men through hazardous barbed wire and debris, finally making his way through the minefield for a distance of 300 yards. When an enemy machinegun opened fire, he signaled his men to take covered positions, edged his way alone toward the flank of the weapon and opened fire, killing 2 members of the guncrew and capturing 3 others. Moving forward again, he encountered and engaged single-handedly an entire company killing 20 Germans and capturing 20, and enabling his platoon to capture the remainder of the hostile group. Again moving ahead and spearheading his battalion's advance, he again encountered machinegun fire. Crawling forward toward the weapon, he reached a point from which he knocked the weapon out of action. Still another minefield had to be crossed. Undeterred, S/Sgt. Minick advanced forward alone through constant enemy fire and while thus moving, detonated a mine and was instantly killed.

== Awards and decorations ==

Badge	Combat Infantryman Badge		
1st row	Medal of Honor		
2nd row	Bronze Star Medal	Purple Heart	Army Good Conduct Medal
3rd row	American Campaign Medal	European–African–Middle Eastern Campaign Medal with 1 Campaign star	World War II Victory Medal

== See also ==
- List of Medal of Honor recipients
- Other Medal of Honor recipients for their actions in the Battle of Hürtgen Forest include Turney W. Leonard, Alfred B. Nietzel, Francis X. McGraw, George L. Mabry, Pedro Cano, and Marcario García.
