= Marcario García =

United States Army Medal of Honor recipient (1920–1972)

Marcario (Macario) García
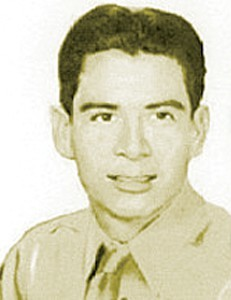
- Staff Sergeant Marcario García, Medal of Honor recipient
- Born: January 2, 1920; Castaños, Coahuila, Mexico
- Died: December 24, 1972 (aged 52); Houston, Texas
- Burial place: Houston National Cemetery, Houston, Texas
- Military career
- Allegiance: United States of America
- Branch: United States Army
- Service years: United States Army: 1942-1945, United States Army Reserve: 1946-1972
- Rank: Command Sergeant Major
- Units: Company B, 1st Battalion, 22d Infantry Regiment, 4th Infantry Division
- Conflicts: World War II (invasion of Normandy)
- Awards: Medal of Honor; Bronze Star Medal; Purple Heart

Staff Sergeant Marcario García also known as Macario García (Note: His "Medal of Honor citation" and some websites referrer to the subject as "Marcario" while in some other websites the subject is referred to as "Macario") (January 20, 1920 – December 24, 1972) was the first Mexican immigrant to receive the Medal of Honor, the United States' highest military decoration. He received the award for his heroic actions as a soldier during World War II.

== Early years ==
García was born in Villa de Castaños, Mexico in the state of Coahuila, one of ten children born to destitute farm workers. In 1923, Garcia's family immigrated to the United States in search of a better way of life. They eventually settled in Sugar Land, Texas, where he worked alongside his parents as a cotton farmer.

Upon the outbreak of World War II, Garcia joined the United States Army at a recruiting station in his adopted hometown in November 1942. He was assigned to Company B, 22nd Infantry Regiment, 4th Infantry Division.

== World War II Service ==
Garcia participated in, and was wounded during, the Allied invasion of Normandy in June 1944. Awarded the Purple Heart, he soon returned to duty where he later earned the Bronze Star. On November 27, 1944, García was an acting squad leader in his platoon, which found itself engaged in combat against the German troops in the vicinity of Grosshau, Germany. Realizing that his company could not advance because it was pinned down by enemy machine gun fire, Garcia, on his own initiative, went ahead alone, destroying two enemy emplacements and capturing four prisoners. Despite being wounded himself, he continued to fight on with his unit until the objective was taken. "Only then did he permit himself to be removed for medical care," his Medal of Honor citation states. In an interview with the Houston Chronicle several years later, Garcia said: "I did not know the wound was so serious. I was numb, I think, and besides, we were moving forward, and it was not the time to stop." Captain Tony Bizzarro, B company commander, made the initial recommendation for the Medal of Honor. He thought Garcia was nothing less than the best soldier in the Army. "He was always willing to do anything he was asked to do," Bizzarro later told the Chronicle.

== Medal of Honor citation ==
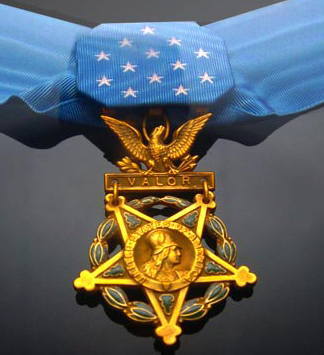

Marcario Garcia
Rank and organization: Staff Sergeant, US Army B Company 1st Battalion 22nd Infantry, 4th Infantry Division.
Place and date: Near Grosshau, Germany---November 27, 1944.
Entered service at: Sugarland, Texas
Born: January 20, 1920, Villa de Castano, Mexico
G.O. # 74 September 1, 1945.
Citation

Staff Sergeant Marcario García, Company B, 22nd Infantry, in action involving actual conflict with the enemy in the vicinity of Grosshau, Germany, 27 November 1944. While an acting squad leader, he single-handedly assaulted two enemy machine gun emplacements. Attacking prepared positions on a wooded hill, which could be approached only through meager cover. His company was pinned down by intense machine-gun fire and subjected to a concentrated artillery and mortar barrage. Although painfully wounded, he refused to be evacuated and on his own initiative crawled forward alone until he reached a position near an enemy emplacement. Hurling grenades, he boldly assaulted the position, destroyed the gun, and with his rifle killed three of the enemy who attempted to escape. When he rejoined his company, a second machine-gun opened fire and again the intrepid soldier went forward, utterly disregarding his own safety. He stormed the position and destroyed the gun, killed three more Germans, and captured four prisoners. He fought on with his unit until the objective was taken and only then did he permit himself to be removed for medical care. S/Sgt. (then Pvt.) Garcia's conspicuous heroism, his inspiring, courageous conduct, and his complete disregard for his personal safety wiped out two enemy emplacements and enabled his company to advance and secure its objective.

== Honors and discrimination ==
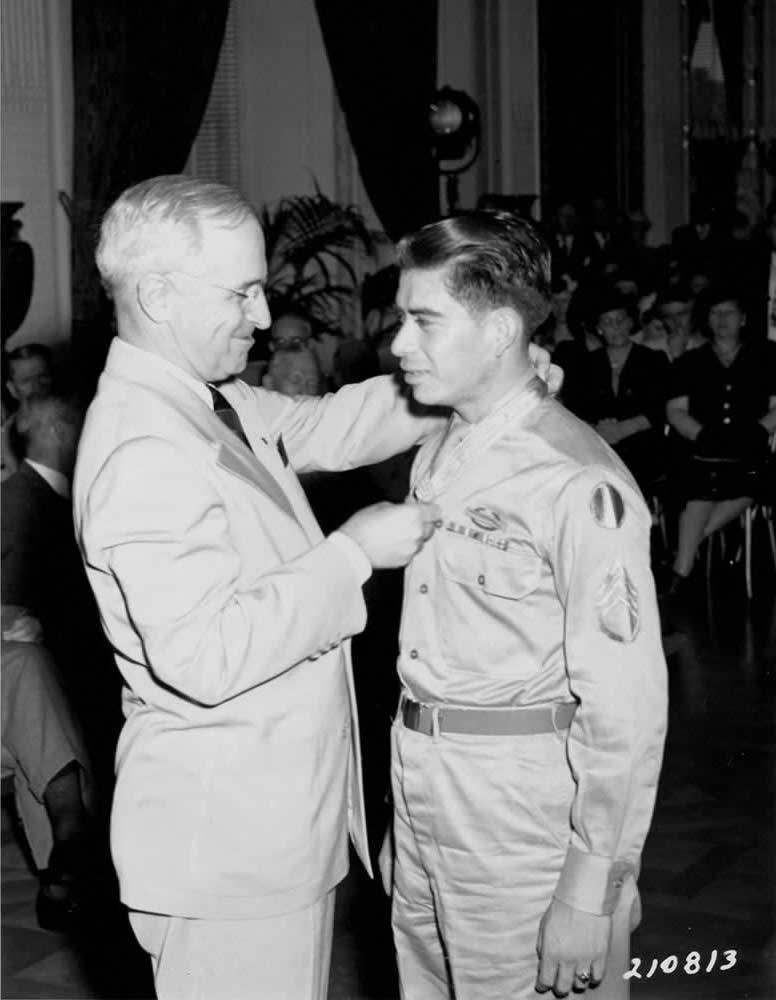
President Truman bestows the Medal of Honor on García

On August 23, 1945, the President of the United States, Harry S. Truman presented Staff Sergeant García with the Medal of Honor at a ceremony in the White House. Shortly afterward, his native land of Mexico awarded him the Mérito Militar, one of the highest awards in the Mexican Army, for valor. A month after he was awarded the Medal of Honor, Garcia was denied service at a restaurant in Sugar Land located just a few miles south of Houston because he was Hispanic. Garcia was beaten with a bat by the owner. No one was arrested and no charges were initially filed. It was only after national columnist Walter Winchell reported the incident and labeled Sugar Land the most racist city in America that charges were filed—against Garcia. Then the incident was covered by the news media, and caused an uproar amongst the Mexican community who rallied to his aid. The nation was made aware as to the discriminatory policies that Mexican-Americans were subject to, as the case against Garcia was repeatedly postponed before being dropped.

== Later years ==
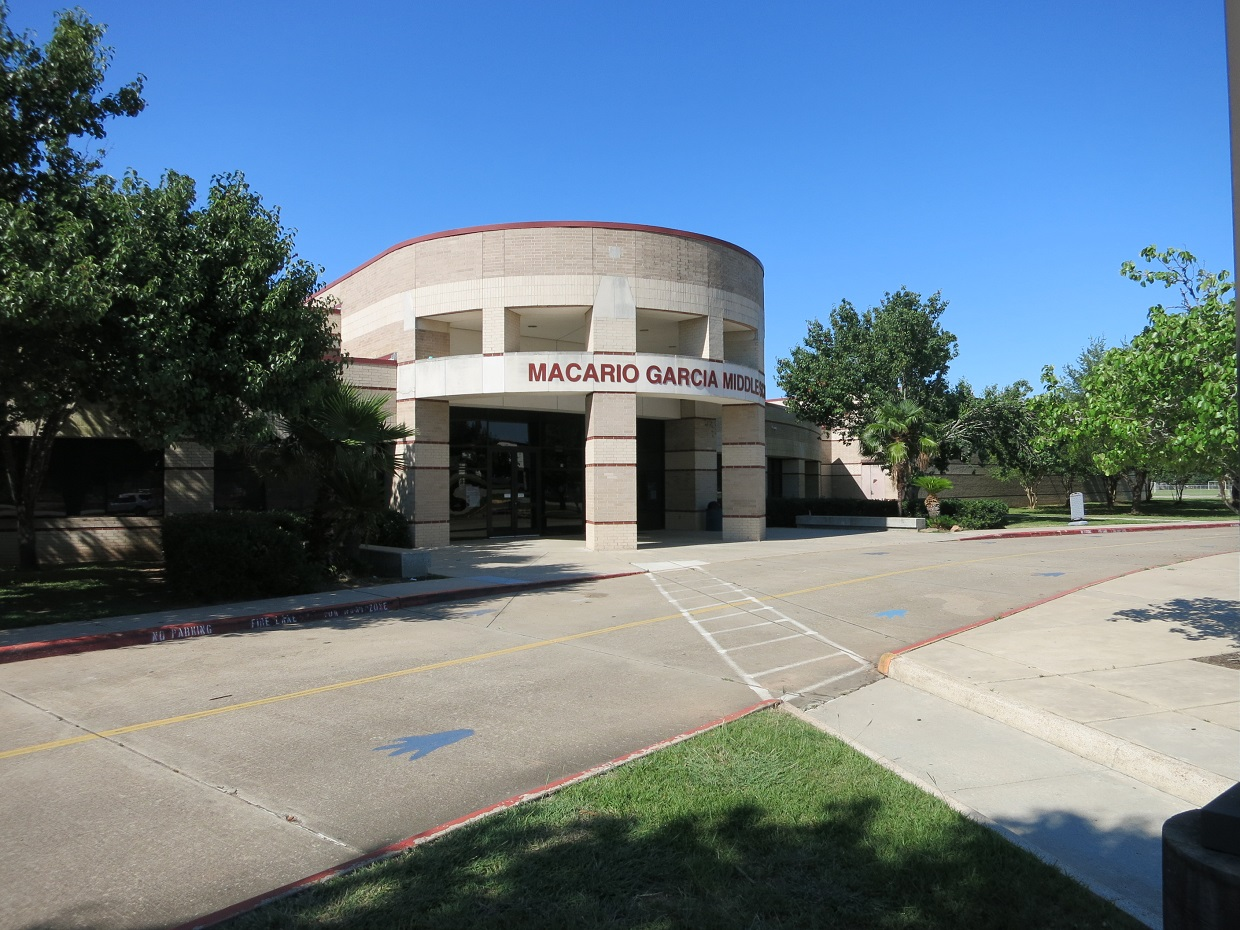
Macario Garcia Middle School near Sugar Land

García became an American citizen on June 25, 1947, and earned a high school diploma in 1951. On May 18, 1952, he married Alicia Reyes with whom he had three children. For twenty-five years he worked as a counselor in the Veterans' Administration.

On the evening of November 21, 1963, Marcario García greeted President John F. Kennedy at the door of the Rice Ballroom in Houston Texas. The ballroom was filled with a diverse crowd of attendees that included Hispanic World War II veterans, Civil Rights advocates and future political activists. The president spoke of U.S. and Latin American Foreign Policy and the importance of recognition and acknowledgement of Hispanic organizations like the League of United Latin American Citizens (LULAC). Speaking in fluent Spanish, Mrs. Kennedy offered words of inspiration and encouragement. The day after this meeting Kennedy was assassinated.

García died on December 24, 1972, from injuries which he received in a car accident. He was buried with full military honors in the Houston National Cemetery in Houston, Texas. The local government of Houston honored his memory by naming a middle school after him as well as renaming part of 69th Street in Houston "S/SGT Marcario García Street". In 1983 Vice President George Bush dedicated Houston's new Macario García Army Reserve Center, and in 1994 Macario Garcia Middle School of the Fort Bend Independent School District, in unincorporated Fort Bend County, Texas, near Sugar Land, was named in García's honor.

On November 11, 2021, a mural by artist Mez Data, was unveiled and dedicated along an exterior wall of Houston Fire Station #20, which is along S/Sgt. Macario Garcia Drive at Navigation Boulevard.

== Awards and recognitions ==
Staff Sergeant Marcario García's decorations and medals were the following:

Badge	Combat Infantryman Badge		
1st row	Medal of Honor		
2nd row	Legion of Merit w/ 1 Oak leaf cluster	Bronze Star	Purple Heart
3rd row	American Campaign Medal	European-African-Middle Eastern Campaign Medal w/ 4 Campaign stars	World War II Victory Medal
4th row	Army of Occupation Medal	National Defense Service Medal	Armed Forces Reserve Medal w/ Silver Hourglass Device

Foreign award

- Mérito Militar - Mexico

== See also ==
- List of Medal of Honor recipients
- List of Medal of Honor recipients for World War II
- Hispanic Medal of Honor recipients
- Hispanic Americans in World War II

Other Medal of Honor recipients for their actions in the Battle of Hürtgen Forest include Turney W. Leonard, Alfred B. Nietzel, Francis X. McGraw, George L. Mabry, John W. Minick, and Pedro Cano.
