= Polizeipräsidium München =

Coordinates: 48°08′20″N 11°34′16″E

Official logo of the Munich Police Department (includes the coat of arms of Munich)

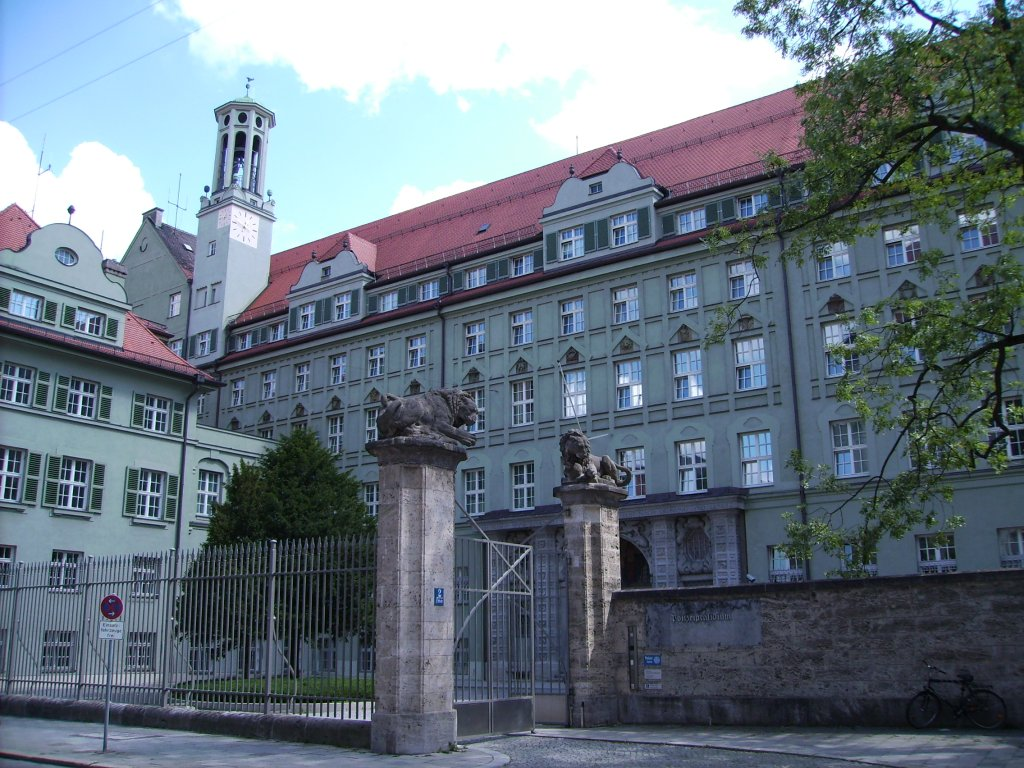
Munich Police Headquarters, located at Ettstraße 2-4

The Polizeipräsidium München (Munich Police Department) is part of the Bavarian State Police. It consists of 7,100 officers and is located in Munich, Germany. The headquarters was established on October 1, 1975, being reorganized from the city police (Stadtpolizei München).

== Overview ==
Its jurisdiction spans over all of Munich (except exterritorial grounds), its districts and a small portion of Starnberg (Krailling and Stockdorf, the latter being a part of Gauting).

Hubertus Andrä has been the Police Commissioner since July 2013.

The Police headquarters has seven subordinate operational bureaus. Three Regional Bureaus (Central, East, West) with a total of 25 police stations, that perform uniformed patrol duty and respond emergency calls. The Traffic Police Bureau is responsible for special traffic functions as speed checks and fatal accidents. Special Services such as the Spezialeinsatzkommando (police tactical unit) is covered by the Special Forces Bureau. Rapid Reaction Companies (Einsatzhundertschaften), Bomb Squad (also responsible for confiscated firearms), the Dog Squad (Hundestaffel) and Mounted police (Reiterstaffel) by the Central Services Bureau. The Investigation Bureau has 10 units (Kriminalfachdezernate), which are organised in offence oriented sections and squads. They prevent, pursue and clear up serious criminal offences.

== Scandals ==
A number of incidents in the late 1990s ranging from police brutality at the Oktoberfest to the fatal shooting of a bystander and drug trading within the police caused debate in parliament. The minister of the interior announced reform.

In January 2013 a photograph of a 23-year-old woman badly beaten by police officers while tied made the press. Police president Wilhelm Schmidbauer sanctioned the actions of the officers, blamed the victim, and had her home raided. The state attorney took weeks to start investigating the officers but did not hesitate to prosecute the victim.

=== 2019/2020 drug scandal ===
Nationwide attention Munich police gained in 2020 when it became known that several Munich police officers were customers of a drug dealer or were drug deales themselves. It is described as the "largest [...] drug scandal at a police headquarters in Germany". The focus was on a drug dealer who set the investigation in motion after he testified as a key witness about his police officers' customers and reported on "police discounts" on cocaine. The public prosecutor's office conducted investigations against 37 police officers from the Munich police and brought eight charges.

== Vehicles ==
The standard patrol car of Munich Police is the BMW 3 Series. Also in use are the BMW 5 Series, Audi A4 and Volkswagen Touran. Rapid Reaction Companies and the Dog Squad use Volkswagen Transporter T4/T5. Special Services and Investigation Units use several unmarked vehicles.

== Notable persons ==
- Wilhelm Frick (1877–1946), Nazi official, executed for war crimes
- Philipp Bouhler (Aug.–Oct. 1934 Police President) SS officer and NSDAP official
