= 3rd Infantry Division (United States) =

Active US Army formation

3rd Division 3rd Infantry Division
- Insignia of the 3rd Infantry Division
- Active: 12 November 1917–present
- Country: United States of America
- Branch: United States Army
- Type: Combined arms Light infantry
- Role: Headquarters
- Size: Division
- Part of: XVIII Airborne Corps
- Garrison/HQ: Fort Stewart, Georgia
- Nickname: "Rock of the Marne"
- Motto: Nous Resterons Là ("We Shall Remain Here")
- March: "Dogface Soldier"
- Mascot: Rocky the Bulldog
- Engagements: World War I; Aisne; Champagne-Marne; Aisne-Marne; Saint-Mihiel; Meuse-Argonne; Champagne 1918; World War II; Algeria-French Morocco; Tunisia; Sicily; Naples-Foggia; Anzio; Southern France; Rhineland; Ardennes-Alsace; Central Europe; Korean War; CCF Intervention; First UN Counteroffensive; Second Korean Winter; Third Battle of Seoul; Gulf War; Liberation of Kuwait; War on terror; Iraq; Afghanistan

Commanders
- Current commander: MG John W. Lubas
- Deputy Commander - Maneuver: COL Timothy Gatlin
- Deputy Commanding General - Readiness: BG Lionel Meny, French Army
- Deputy Commanding General - Support: BG Kevin Bradley
- Chief of Staff: COL Aaron L.B. Cox
- Command Sergeant Major: CSM Donald Durgin
- Notable commanders: Full list of commanders

Insignia
- Distinctive unit insignia of the division's headquarters battalion

- Divisional flag

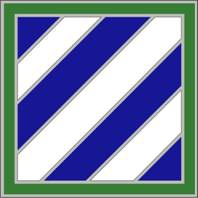
- Combat service identification badge

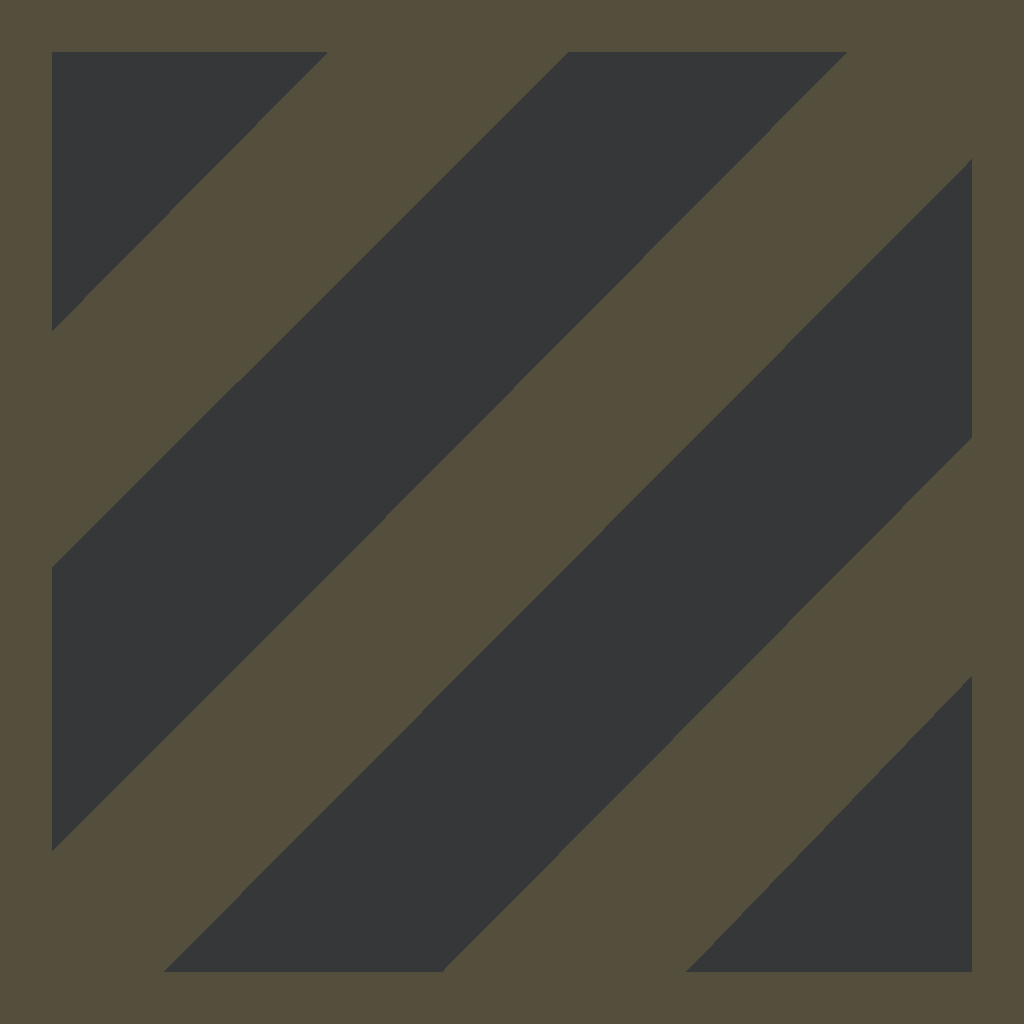
- Shoulder sleeve insignia (subdued)

The 3rd Infantry Division (3ID) (nicknamed Rock of the Marne) is a combined arms division of the United States Army based at Fort Stewart, Georgia. It is a subordinate unit of the XVIII Airborne Corps under U.S. Army Forces Command. Its current organization includes a division headquarters and headquarters battalion, two armored brigade combat teams, one aviation brigade, a division artillery, a sustainment brigade and a combat sustainment support battalion along with a maneuver enhancement brigade. The division has a distinguished history, having seen active service in World War I, World War II, the Korean War, and in the Iraq War (US phase 2003–2011), and in the War in Afghanistan (2001–2021). The Medal of Honor has been awarded to 61 members of the 3rd Infantry Division, making the division the most honored in the Army.

The division fought in France in World War I. In World War II, it landed with General Patton's task force in a contested amphibious landing on the coast of Morocco, North Africa, overwhelming Vichy French defenders in November 1942. In 1943, the division invaded Sicily in July, and invaded Italy at Salerno in September, before fighting in France and finally Germany. Medal of Honor recipient Audie Murphy, featured in the Hollywood movie To Hell and Back, was a member. The division also served in the Korean War. From 1957 until 1996, the division was a major part of the United States Army's presence in West Germany as part of the NATO alliance.

== History ==
=== World War I ===
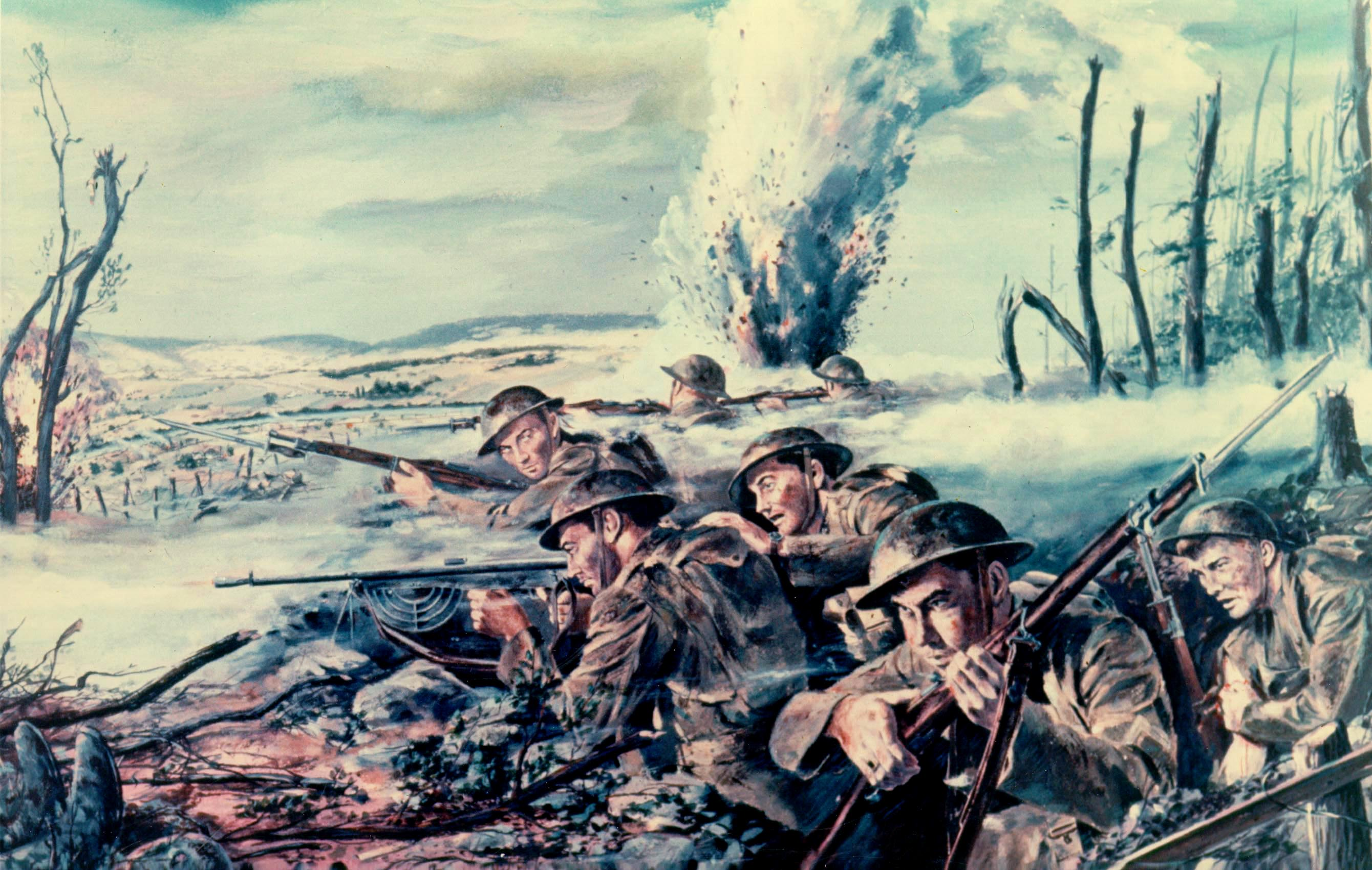
38th Infantry Regiment repelled the German attack near Mézy, France, across the Marne River in July 1918. This defense checked the Germans' assault and made an Allied offensive possible, thus earning 38th Infantry Regiment's nickname "Rock of the Marne".

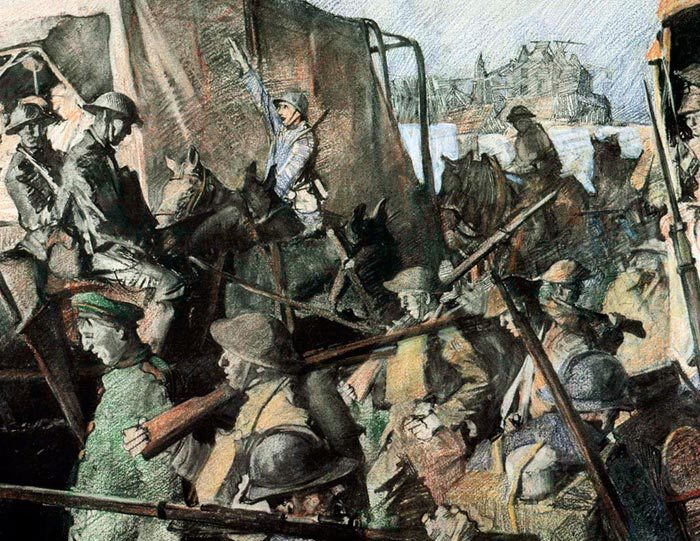
1918 Traffic To Mont-St. Pere by George Matthews Harding AEF unit is the 3rd US Infantry Division.

The War Department directed the organization of the 3rd Division on 12 November 1917 at Camp Greene, North Carolina, seven months after the American entry into World War I. Organization began on 21 November 1917, around a nucleus of Regular Army units that had been stationed at Camp Greene, Camp Forrest, Georgia, Camp Shelby, Mississippi, Camps Stanley and Travis, Texas, Camp Stuart, Virginia, Forts Bliss and Clark, Texas, Fort Douglas, Utah, Fort Leavenworth, Kansas, and Washington Barracks. Training began in late November 1917, and in December 1917 and January 1918, 10,000 draftees predominantly from the northeastern United States (sent from Camp Devens, Massachusetts, Camp Dix, New Jersey, Camp Lee, Virginia, Camp Meade, Maryland, and Camp Upton, New York) completed the division. Advance elements of the division (the 6th Engineers and Train, the advance detachment, and 5th Field Signal Battalion) sailed for France from December 1917 through February 1918, followed by the remainder of the division from March to May 1918.

==== Order of battle ====
- Headquarters, 3rd Division
- 5th Infantry Brigade
  - 4th Infantry Regiment
  - 7th Infantry Regiment
  - 8th Machine Gun Battalion
- 6th Infantry Brigade
  - 30th Infantry Regiment
  - 38th Infantry Regiment (formed with a cadre from the 30th Infantry)
  - 9th Machine Gun Battalion
- 3rd Field Artillery Brigade
  - 10th Field Artillery Regiment (75 mm) (formed with a cadre from the 6th Field Artillery)
  - 18th Field Artillery Regiment (155 mm) (formed with a cadre from the 5th Field Artillery)
  - 76th Field Artillery Regiment (75 mm) (formed from the 20th Cavalry)
  - 3rd Trench Mortar Battery
- 6th Engineer Regiment
- 7th Machine Gun Battalion
- 5th Field Signal Battalion
- Headquarters Troop, 3rd Division
- 3rd Train Headquarters and Military Police
  - 3rd Ammunition Train
  - 3rd Supply Train
  - 3rd Engineer Train
  - 3rd Sanitary Train
    - 5th, 7th, 26th, and 27th Ambulance Companies and Field Hospitals

==== Combat chronicle ====
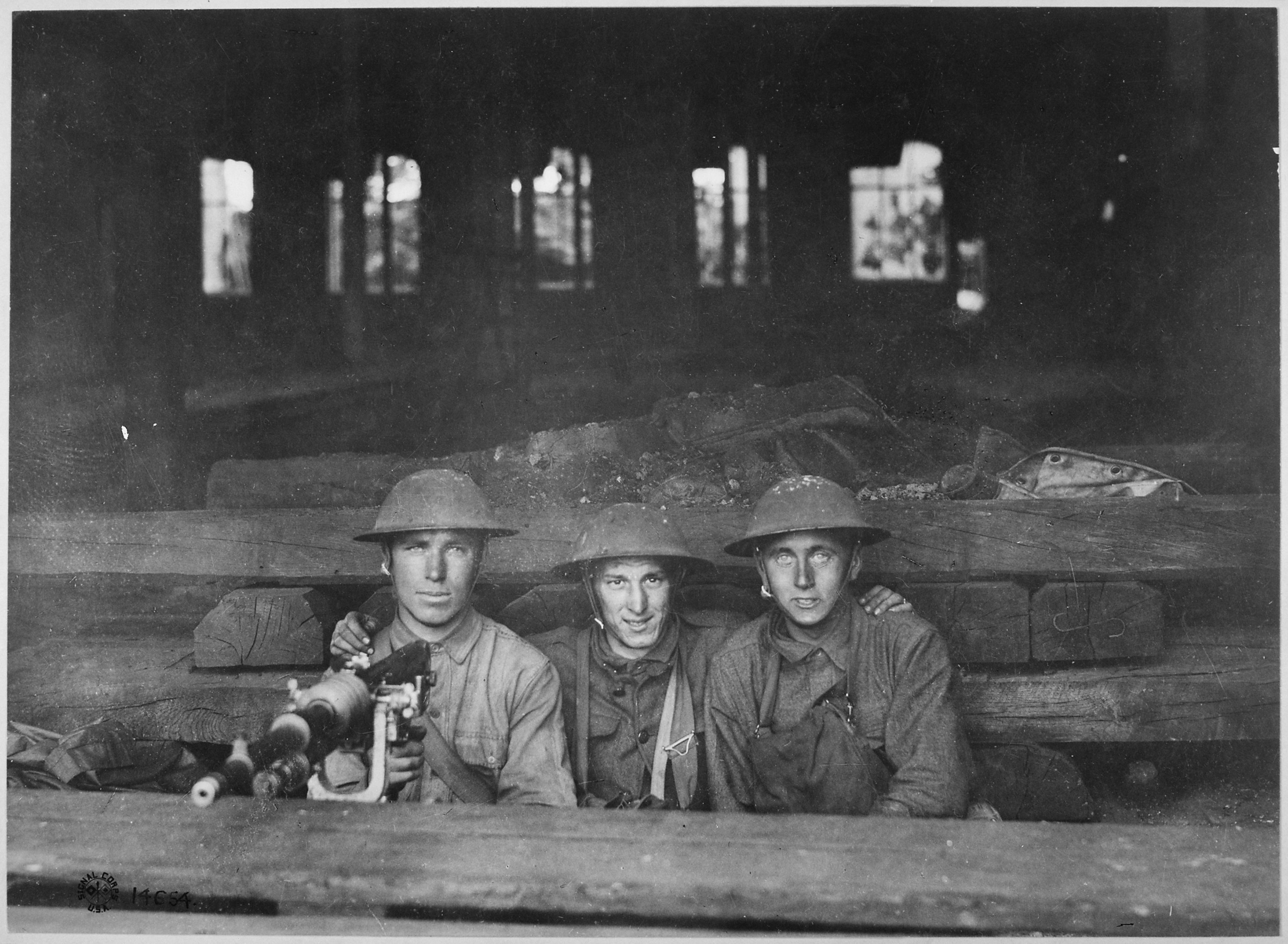
Doughboys of Company A, 9th Machine Gun Battalion, 3rd Division set up in a railroad shop, Chateau Thierry, France, July 6, 1918.

At midnight on 14 July 1918, the division earned a lasting distinction. Engaged in the Aisne-Marne Offensive as a member of the American Expeditionary Force (AEF) to Europe, the division was protecting the French capital of Paris with a position on the banks of the Marne River. The 8th Machine Gun Battalion of the 3rd Division rushed to Château-Thierry amid retreating French troops and held the Germans back at the Marne River. While surrounding units retreated, the 3rd Division, including the 4th, 30th, and 38th Infantry Regiments, remained steadfast throughout the Second Battle of the Marne, and Colonel Ulysses G. McAlexander's dogged defense earned the 38th Infantry Regiment its nickname as the "Rock of the Marne". During the massive attack, the 3rd Infantry Division's commanding officer, Major General Joseph T. Dickman, famously cried out "Nous Resterons La" (We Shall Remain Here). Their Blue and White insignia also earned them the nickname The Blue and White Devils." The rest of the division was absorbed under French command until brought back together under the command of Major General Dickman, and by 15 July 1918 they took the brunt of what was to be the last German offensive of the war. General John Joseph "Black Jack" Pershing, Commander-in-chief of the AEF on the Western Front, called this stand "one of the most brilliant pages in the annals of military history". During the war, two members of the division were awarded the Medal of Honor.

Casualties during the war were 3,177 killed in action with 12,940 wounded.

=== Interwar period ===
The 3rd Division arrived at Camp Merritt, Hoboken, New Jersey, between 23 and 28 August 1919, after completing nine months of occupation duty near and in Mayen, Germany. At Camp Merritt, all emergency period personnel were discharged from the service. The division proceeded to Camp Pike, Arkansas, where the headquarters arrived on 31 August 1919. The division remained at Camp Pike until 1921, when it was allotted to the Ninth Corps Area as the IX Corps' Regular Army infantry division, and was transferred on a permanent change of station to Camp Lewis (later redesignated Fort Lewis), Washington, where it arrived in September of that year. The division's units were ordered to posts throughout the western United States and Alaska in fall 1921 and early 1922. The division headquarters and special troops remained at Camp Lewis.

The 5th Infantry Brigade moved its headquarters to Vancouver Barracks, Washington, and its subordinate units to posts in Washington, North Dakota, and Alaska. The 6th Infantry Brigade was headquartered at Fort Douglas, Utah, as was the 38th Infantry Regiment, while the 30th Infantry Regiment was stationed at the Presidio of San Francisco, California. The 3rd Field Artillery Brigade's units were located at Camp Lewis with the exception of the 76th Field Artillery Regiment, which was split between Fort D.A. Russell, Wyoming, and the Presidio of Monterey, California. The division's units usually conducted the training of Organized Reserve units, Citizens Military Training Camp participants, and ROTC cadets at various posts throughout the Ninth Corps Area during the summer months. The officers of the IX Corps, XIX Corps, and the 91st, 96th, and 104th Divisions were habitually trained at the Organized Reserve camps. By the mid-1920s, the division headquarters had nearly ceased to exist, with only the division commander and a few staff officers remaining to carry out essential functions; they did not exercise a true command function over their units. By 1926, the War Department and the Ninth Corps Area realized the unsustainability of the situation and repopulated the 3rd Division headquarters.

Training of divisional units took place for the most part in the late summer and early fall after they assisted the training of the Reserve components. The largest concentration of division units since 1921 occurred in April 1927 when all units, except the 6th Infantry Brigade, were assembled at Camp Lewis for division maneuvers. The next major training event for the division came in August 1931 when much of the "Marne" Division (not including the 5th Infantry Brigade and parts of the 3rd Field Artillery Brigade), was assembled at the Gigling Military Reservation in California to maneuver against the 11th Cavalry Regiment. The first opportunity to assemble the entire division came in April 1937 when all elements, except one battalion in Alaska, converged on Fort Lewis for division maneuvers. Oddly, three months later the division did not participate in the Fourth Army maneuvers as a complete unit, but was split between Fort Lewis and Camp Ord, California. The 3rd Division reorganized into the "triangular" configuration in October 1939, with the 4th and 38th Infantry Regiments relieved, the 15th Infantry Regiment assigned, and the field artillery, engineer, medical, and quartermaster regiments subsequently reorganized into battalions.

Beginning in December 1939, the division participated in numerous training exercises to better prepare it for impending war. That month, the entire "Marne" Division deployed to California for amphibious operations at Monterey and maneuver training at Camp Ord to test the new triangular organization. After the exercises in California, the division returned to Fort Lewis to participate in the Fourth Army maneuvers near Fort Lewis and Centralia, Washington, in August 1940. In April 1941, the "Marne" Division participated in the IX Corps maneuver at Fort Lewis, operating against the National Guard 41st Division. The following month, the division moved to Hunter Liggett Military Reservation, California, to participate in the Fourth Army maneuver there, which pitted the IX Corps against the III Corps. The 3rd Division returned to Fort Lewis in July and there participated in another Fourth Army maneuver, again in the vicinity of Fort Lewis-Centralia, in August–September 1941.

=== World War II ===
==== Division organization ====
The 3rd Infantry Division consisted of the following units:

3rd Infantry Division organization (click to enlarge)

- 3rd Infantry Division
  - 3rd Infantry Division Headquarters
  - 3rd Cavalry Reconnaissance Troop (Mechanized) (M3 scout cars and then M8 Greyhound armored cars)
  - 7th Infantry Regiment
    - Headquarters and Headquarters Company
    - 3× Infantry battalions
      - each battalion consists of: 1× Headquarters and Headquarters Company, 3× Rifle companies, 1× Heavy Weapons Company
    - Cannon Company (T12 Gun Motor Carriages and T19 Howitzer Motor Carriages, later replaced by either M3 105mm towed howitzers or M7 Priest self propelled howitzers)
    - Anti-Tank Company (M3 37mm anti-tank guns, which were replaced by 1944 with M1 57mm anti-tank guns)
    - Service Company
  - 15th Infantry Regiment
    - same organization as 7th Infantry Regiment
  - 30th Infantry Regiment
    - same organization as 7th Infantry Regiment
  - 3rd Infantry Division Artillery
    - Headquarters and Headquarters Battery
    - 9th Field Artillery Battalion
      - Headquarters and Headquarters Battery
      - 3× Batteries (M1 155mm towed howitzers)
      - Service Battery
    - 10th Field Artillery Battalion
      - Headquarters and Headquarters Battery
      - 3× Batteries (M2 105mm towed howitzers)
      - Service Battery
    - 39th Field Artillery Battalion
      - same organization as 10th Field Artillery Battalion
    - 41st Field Artillery Battalion
      - same organization as 10th Field Artillery Battalion
  - Headquarters Special Troops
    - Headquarters Company, 3rd Infantry Division
    - 3rd Signal Company
    - 3rd Quartermaster Company
    - 703rd Ordnance Light Maintenance Company
    - 3rd Military Police Platoon
    - 3rd Infantry Division Band (attached)
  - 10th Engineer Combat Battalion
    - Headquarters and Headquarters and Service Company
    - 3× Engineer combat companies
  - 3rd Medical Battalion
    - Headquarters and Headquarters Detachment
    - 3× Collecting companies
    - Clearing Company

==== Chips ====
The 3rd Infantry Division also had a German Shepherd, Border Collie and Siberian Husky-mix war dog named "Chips" from Pleasantville, New York, given to them by the Dogs for Defense program. He was assigned to the 3rd Infantry Division from October 1942 until he was discharged in December 1945, serving in several campaigns, including the Algerian-Moroccan, Tunisian, Sicilian, Rhineland and Central Europe Campaigns.

==== Combat chronicle ====
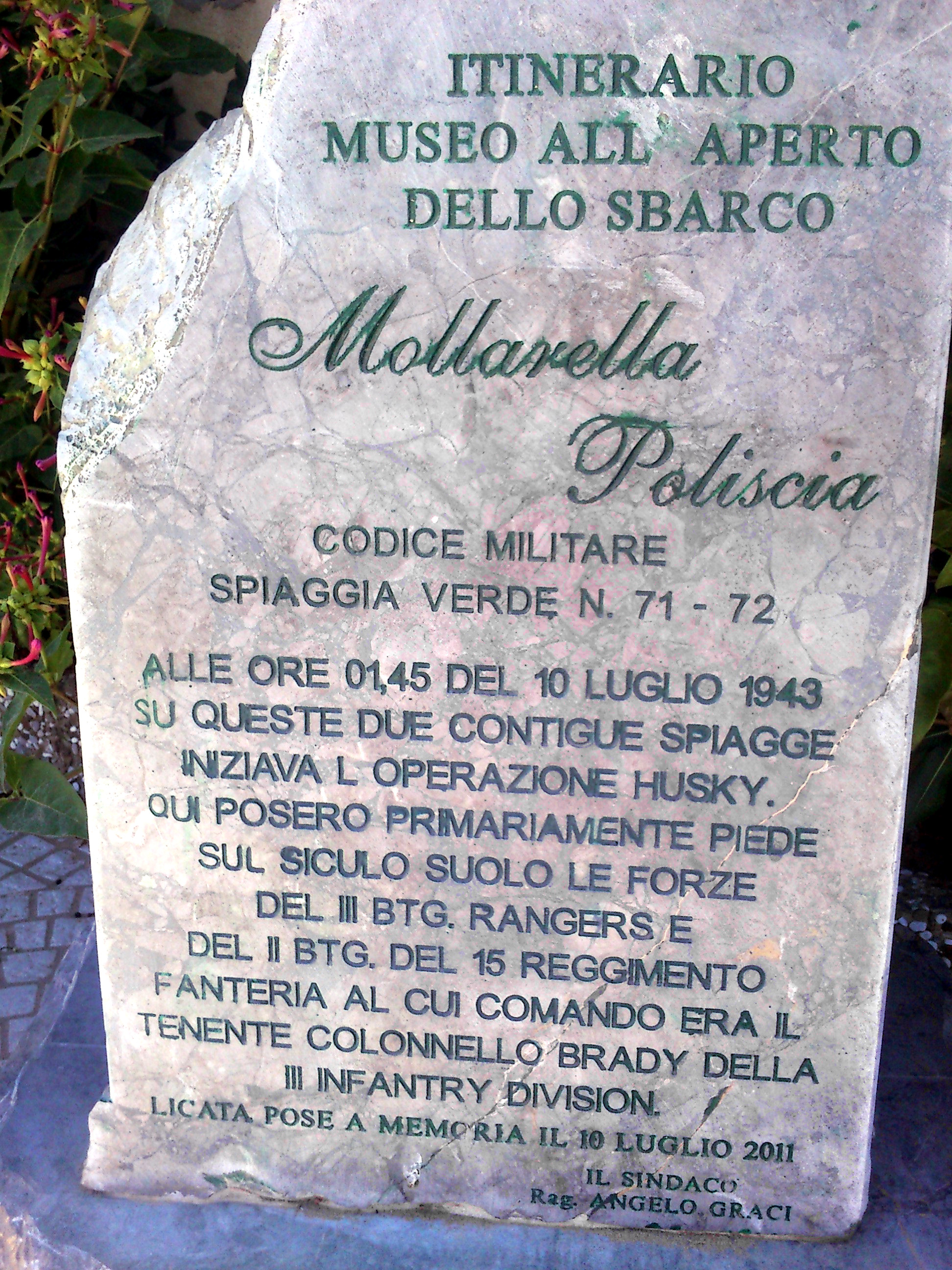

The 3rd Division is the only division of the U.S. Army during World War II that fought the Axis on all European fronts, and was among the first American combat units to engage in offensive ground combat operations. Audie Murphy, the most highly decorated American soldier of the war, served with the 3rd Division. The 3rd Infantry Division saw combat in North Africa, Sicily, Italy, France, Germany and Austria for 531 consecutive days. During the war, the 3rd Infantry Division consisted of the 7th, 15th and 30th Infantry Regiments, together with supporting units.

The 3rd Division, under the command of Major General Jonathan W. Anderson, after spending many months training in the United States after the Japanese attack on Pearl Harbor, first saw action during the war as a part of the Western Task Force in Operation Torch, the Allied invasion of North Africa, landing at Fedala on 8 November 1942, and captured half of French Morocco. The division remained there for the next few months and therefore took no part in the Tunisian Campaign, which came to an end in May 1943 with the surrender of almost 250,000 Axis soldiers who subsequently became prisoners of war (POWs). While there, a battalion of the 30th Infantry Regiment acted as security guards during the Casablanca Conference in mid-January 1943 with Chips as one of the guard dogs. Some soldiers say that Chips saved lives before the conference took place by sniffing out a time bomb set up by enemy saboteurs. In late February, Major General Anderson left the division to return to the United States and command the X Corps, and was replaced by Major General Lucian K. Truscott, Jr., who had formerly been on the staff of the commander-in-chief of Allied forces in North Africa. Truscott instituted a tough training regime and ensured that all ranks in the division could march five miles in one hour, and four miles an hour thereafter; the troops called it "the Truscott Trot". The division began intensive training in amphibious landing operations.

On 10 July 1943, the division (with a Moroccan Goumier Tabor attached) made another amphibious assault landing on the Italian island of Sicily (codenamed Operation Husky), at Licata, a town on the beach, with Torre di Gaffi and Mollarella to the west, and, to the east, Falconara. During the invasion, a platoon of soldiers from the 30th Infantry Regiment, accompanied by Chips, moved inland into the Sicilian countryside when they got ambushed by Italian mortar and machine gun fire. Cut off from the rest of the regiment by Italian skirmishes and the field telephone line cut from the bombardment, the platoon fought hard until Chips, ordered by his handler Pvt. John P. Rowell, ran back to HQ with a phone line to restore communication while dodging enemy fire. Chips ran back through enemy fire as he returned to his handler and the platoon received word that reinforcements were on their way. Meanwhile, another Italian machine gun team made their way around the rear of the platoon and opened fire. The platoon leader sent a lone American soldier to take out the enemy machine-gun (MG) nest. But when he was pinned down, Chips broke free from his handler and ran toward the MG nest, jumped in and attacked the Italian soldiers manning the gun. Pvt. Rowell and the other soldier ran to help Chips and the gunners were forced to surrender. Chips sustained a scalp wound and gunpowder burns from the explosions. After his honorable discharge in 1945, Chips returned to New York to spend the rest of his days at home with his civilian family, the Wrens. He died about a year after returning home, as a result of injuries suffered during the war.

Later, the 3rd Infantry Division, serving under the command of Lieutenant General George S. Patton's U.S. Seventh Army, fought its way into Palermo before elements of the 2nd Armored Division could get there, in the process marching 90 miles in three days, and raced on to capture Messina on 17 August 1943, thus ending the brief Sicilian campaign, where the division had a short rest to absorb replacements. During the campaign, the 3rd Division gained a reputation as one of the best divisions in the Seventh Army.

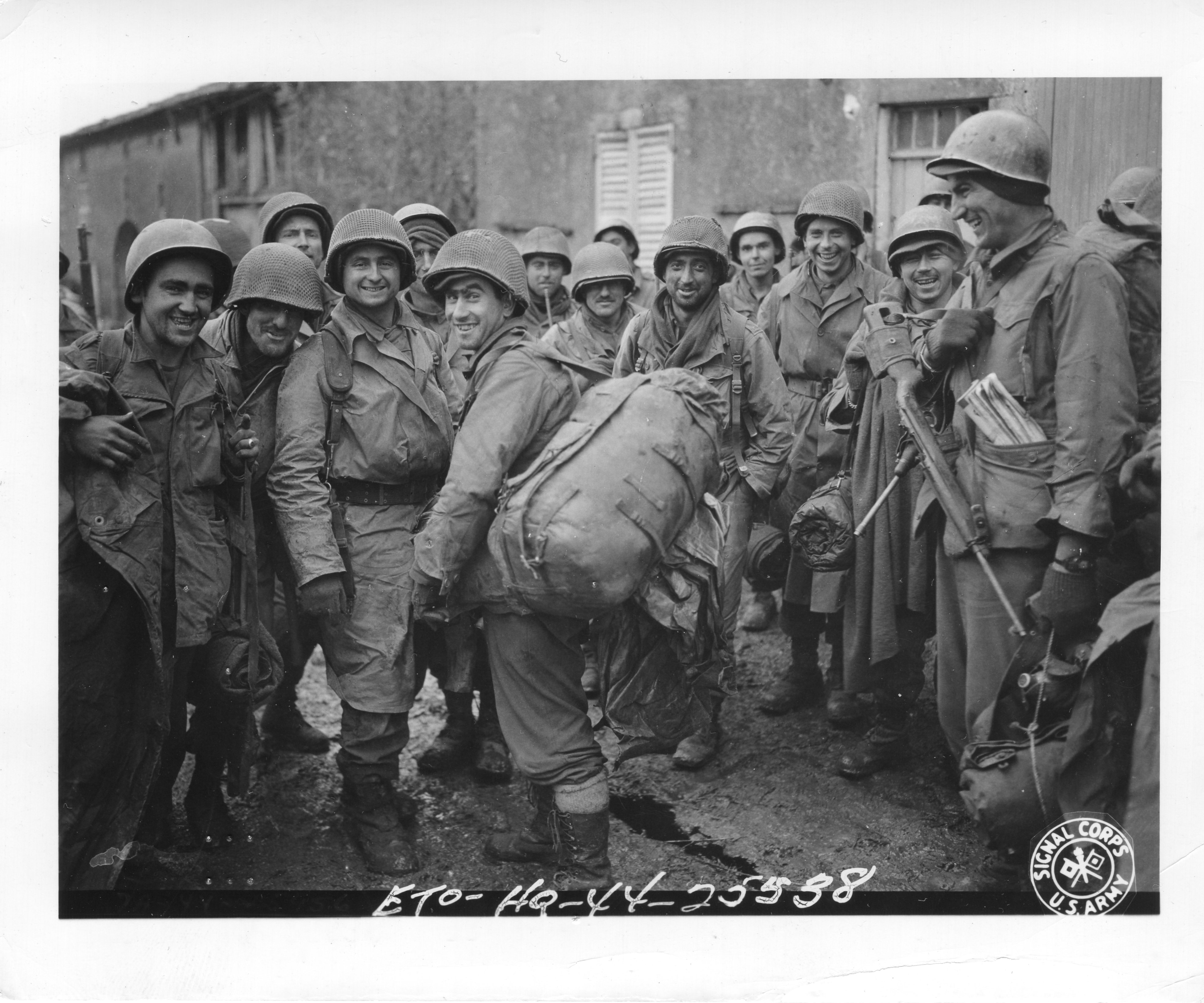
Infantrymen of 2nd Battalion, 30th Infantry Regiment depicted near Bult, France. 11 November 1944.

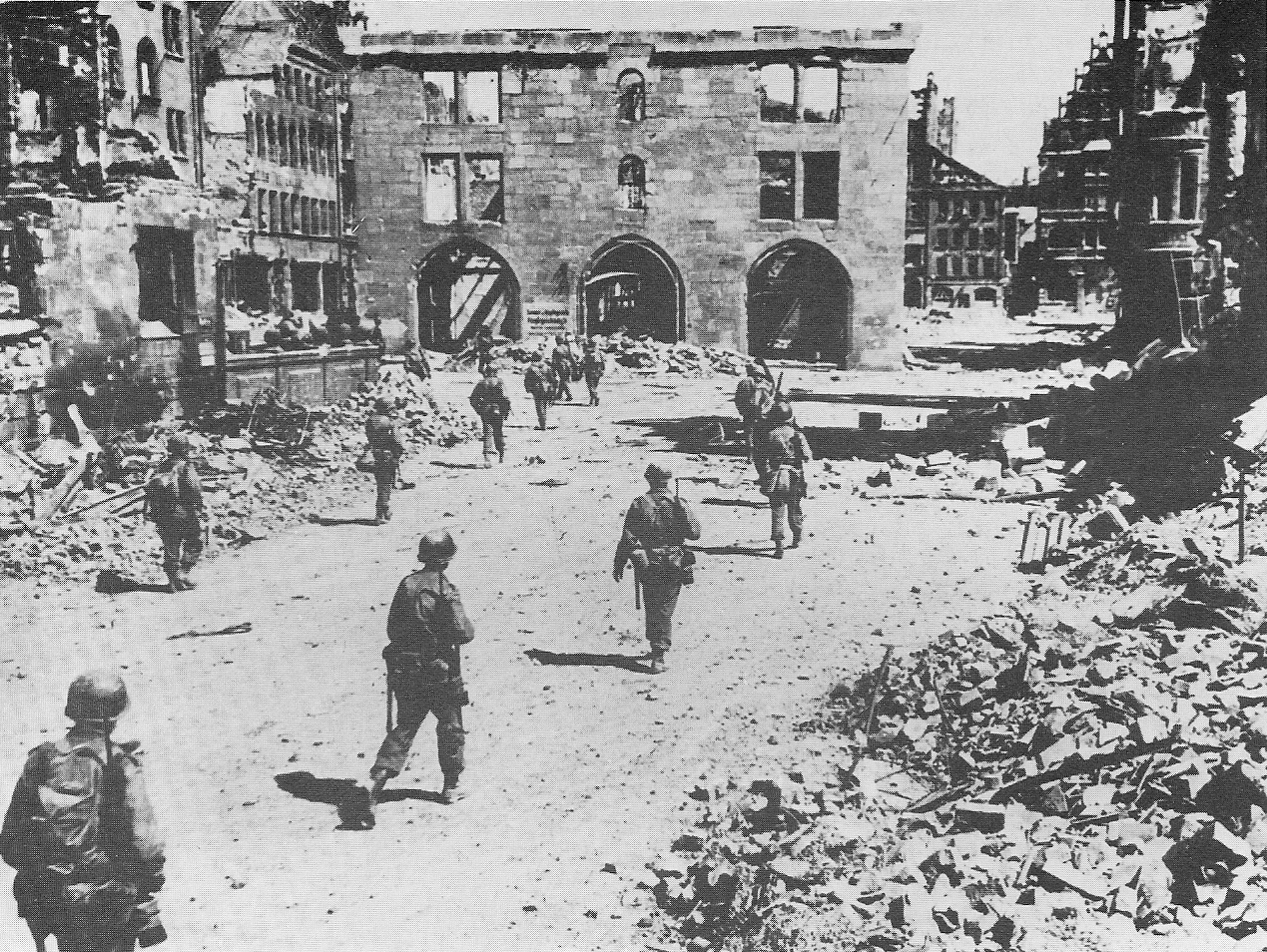
Men of the U.S. 3rd Infantry Division in Nuremberg, Germany on 20 April 1945

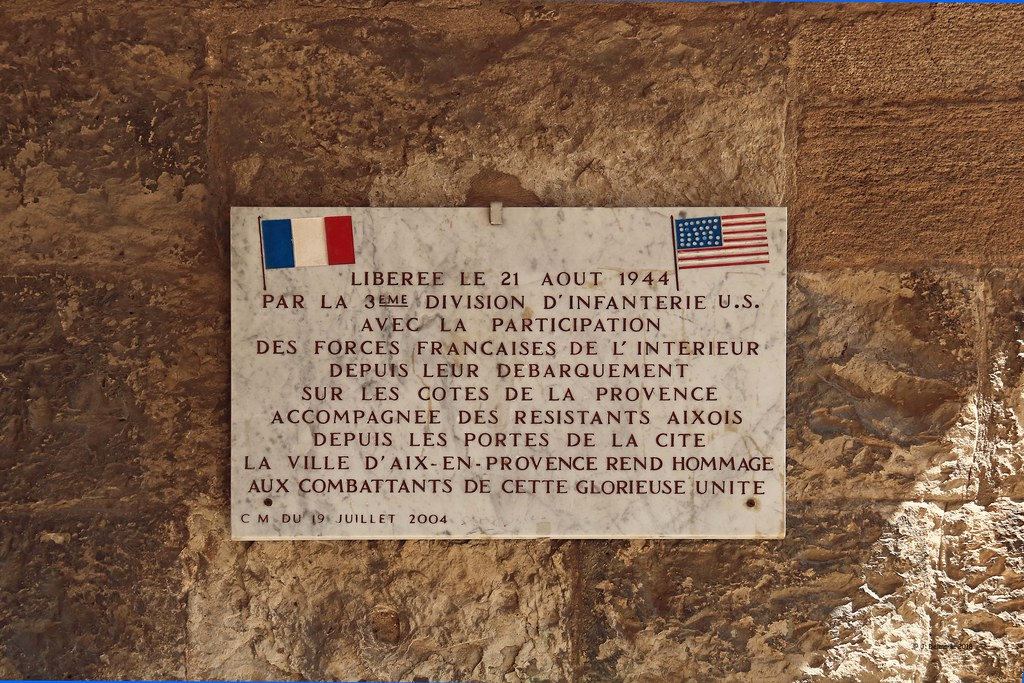

Eight days after the Allied invasion of mainland Italy, on 18 September 1943, the 3rd Division came ashore at Salerno, where they came under the command of VI Corps, under Major General Ernest J. Dawley who was replaced two days later by Major General John P. Lucas (who had commanded the division from September 1941 to March 1942). The corps was part of Lieutenant General Mark W. Clark's U.S. Fifth Army. The 3rd Division was destined to see some of the fiercest and toughest fighting of the war thus far, serving on the Italian Front. Seeing intensive action along the way, the division drove to and across the Volturno River by October 1943, and then to Monte Cassino, where the Battle of Monte Cassino would later be fought, before, with the rest of the 15th Army Group, being held up at the Winter Line (also known as the Gustav Line). In mid-November the division, after spearheading the Fifth Army's advance and suffering heavy casualties during the past few weeks, was relieved by the 36th Infantry Division and pulled out of the line to rest and absorb replacements, coming under the command of Major General Geoffrey Keyes' II Corps. The division remained out of action until late December.

After a brief rest, the division was part of the amphibious landing at Anzio, codenamed Operation Shingle, on 22 January 1944, still as part of VI Corps, and serving alongside the British 1st Infantry Division and other units. It would remain there for just over four months in a toe-hold against numerous furious German counterattacks, and enduring trench warfare similar to that suffered on the Western Front during World War I. On 29 February 1944, the 3rd Division fought off an attack by three German divisions, who fell back with heavy losses two days later. In a single day of combat at Anzio, the 3rd Infantry Division suffered more than 900 casualties, the most of any American division on one day in World War II. The division's former commander, Major General Lucas, was replaced as commander of VI Corps by the 3rd Infantry Division's commander, Major General Truscott; he was replaced in command of the division by Brigadier General (later Major General) John W. "Iron Mike" O'Daniel, previously the assistant division commander (ADC) and a distinguished World War I veteran.

In late May, VI Corps broke out of the Anzio beachhead in Operation Diadem with the 3rd Division in the main thrust. Instead of defeating the Germans, Lieutenant General Clark, the Fifth Army commander, disobeying orders from General Sir Harold Alexander, Commander-in-Chief (C-in-C) of the Allied Armies in Italy (formerly the 15th Army Group), sent the division on to the Italian capital of Rome. This allowed the majority of the German 10th Army, which would otherwise have been trapped, to escape, thus prolonging the campaign in Italy. The division was then removed from the front line and went into training for the Operation Dragoon, the Allied invasion of Southern France.

On 15 August 1944, D-Day for Dragoon, the division, still under VI Corps command but back under the U.S. Seventh Army, landed at St. Tropez, advanced up the Rhone Valley, through the Vosges Mountains, and reached the Rhine at Strasbourg, 26–27 November 1944. After maintaining defensive positions it took part in clearing the Colmar Pocket on 23 January, and on 15 March struck against Siegfried Line positions south of Zweibrücken. The division advanced through the defenses and crossed the Rhine, on 26 March 1945; then drove on to take Nuremberg in a fierce battle, capturing the city in block-by-block fighting, 17–20 April. The 3rd pushed on to take Augsburg where it liberated thousands of forced laborers from the Augsburg concentration camp, a forced labor subcamp of Dachau, and Munich, 27–30 April, and was in the vicinity of Salzburg when the war in Europe ended. Elements of the 7th Infantry Regiment serving under the 3rd Infantry Division captured Hitler's retreat near Berchtesgaden.

==== Casualties ====
- Total battle casualties: 25,977
- Killed in action: 4,922
- Wounded in action: 18,766
- Missing in action: 554
- Prisoner of war: 1,735

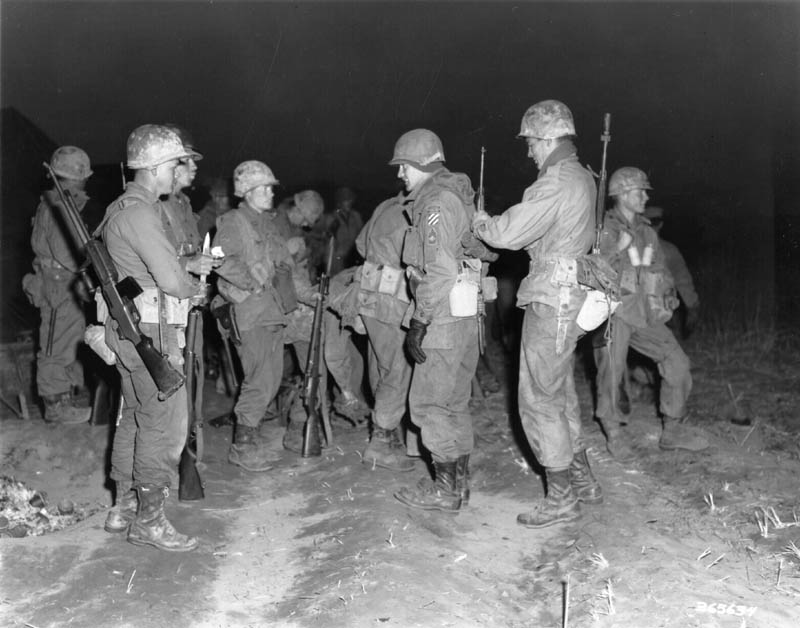
3rd Ranger Company troops getting ready to patrol the Imjin River, 1951

During the Korean War, the division was known as the "Fire Brigade" for its rapid response to the crisis. 3rd Infantry Division had been headquartered at Fort Benning along with its 15th Infantry Regiment. The 7th Infantry Regiment was located at Fort Devens. 3rd Infantry Division initially arrived in Japan where, as the Far East Command Reserve, it planned post-conflict occupation missions in northern Korea. In Japan their strength was increased by augmentation by South Korean soldiers. The division was assigned to X Corps and landed at Wonsan on the east coast of Korea on 5 November and received the 65th Infantry Regiment as their third maneuver element before moving north to Hungnam and Majon-dong. At Majon-dong they established a defensive position with the 65th Infantry. 1st and 2nd Battalions of the 7th Infantry were on the left flank. The 15th Infantry was between the 7th and 65th Regiments. 3rd Battalion, 7th Infantry was set as the nucleus for Task Force Dog which was commanded by Brigadier General Armistead D. Mead, assistant 3rd Division commander and sent north to conduct a relief in place with 1st Battalion, 1st Marine Regiment at Chinhung-ni; the south end of the 1st Marine Division and support the withdrawal of 1st Marine Division and Regimental Combat Team 31 from the fighting at the Chosin Reservoir. 3rd Infantry Division's Task Force Dog was the rearguard keeping the pressure off of the Marine column. The division along with the 7th Infantry Division established a collapsing perimeter around the port of Hungnam until the last of X Corps was evacuated. The division was the last unit to leave Hungnam and was shipped to Pusan where it completed unloading on 30 December and moved north to Kyongju and on 31 December it was placed in Eighth Army reserve for reorganization and reequipping following which it was to move into the Pyongtaek-Ansong area. The division was then transferred to the US I Corps.

In January 1953 the division was transferred from I Corps. The division served in Korea until 1953 when it was withdrawn. Notably, the division fought at the Chorwon-Kumwha area, Jackson Heights and Arrowhead outposts and blocked a push in the Kumsong Area in July 1953.

The 3rd Infantry Division received ten Battle Stars. Eleven more members of the unit received Medals of Honor during the Korean War. Eight were from the 7th Infantry Regiment: Jerry K. Crump (6 and 7 September 1951), John Essebagger, Jr. (25 April 1951), Charles L. Gilliland (25 April 1951), Clair Goodblood (24 and 25 April 1951), Noah O. Knight (23 and 24 November 1951), Darwin K. Kyle (16 February 1951), Leroy A. Mendonca (4 July 1951), and Hiroshi H. Miyamura, whose award was classified Top Secret until his repatriation (24 and 25 April 1951). Three more recipients were with the 15th Infantry Regiment: Emory L. Bennett (24 June 1951), Ola L. Mize (10 and 11 June 1953) and Charles F. Pendleton (16 and 17 July 1953).

During the Korean War, the division had 2,160 killed in action and 7,939 wounded.

After the armistice, the division remained in Korea until 1954 when it was reduced to near zero strength, the colors were transferred to Fort Benning, Georgia and, in December 1954, the 47th Infantry Division was reflagged as the Third.

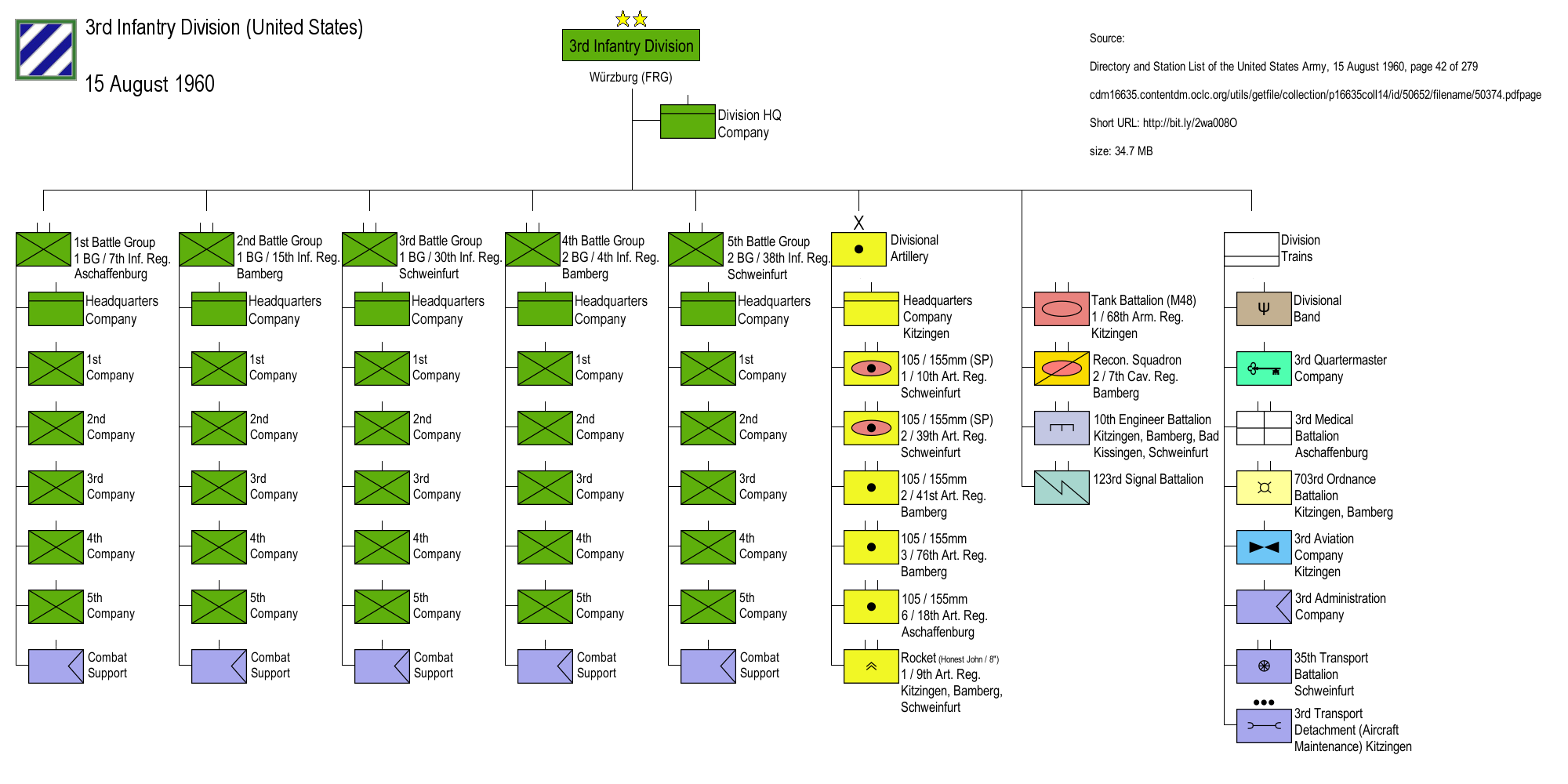
As a Pentomic Division

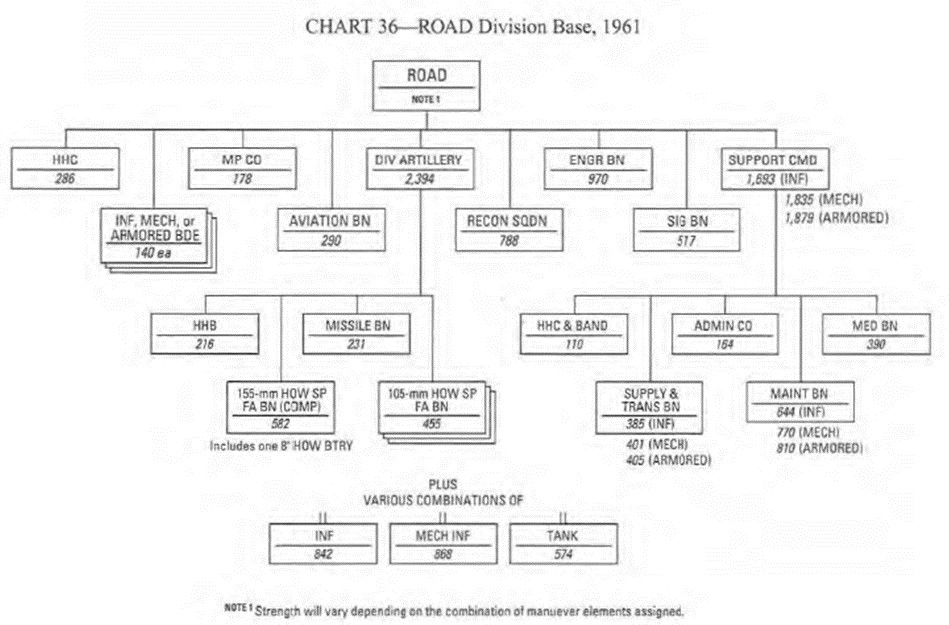
Standard organization chart for a ROAD division

On 1 July 1957, the division was reorganized as a Pentomic Division. The division's three infantry regiments (the 7th, 15th and 30th) were inactivated, with their elements reorganized into five infantry battle groups (the 1-7 IN, 1-15 IN, 1-30 IN, 2-38 IN and the 2-4 IN). In April 1958, the division deployed to Germany as part of an Operation Gyroscope rotation (soldiers and families, no equipment), switching places with the 10th Infantry Division (which was reflagged as the 2nd Infantry Division upon its arrival at Fort Benning). In 1963, the division was reorganized as a Reorganization Objective Army Division (ROAD). Three Brigade Headquarters were activated and Infantry units were reorganized into battalions.

=== Cold War to the Millennium (1953 through 2000) ===
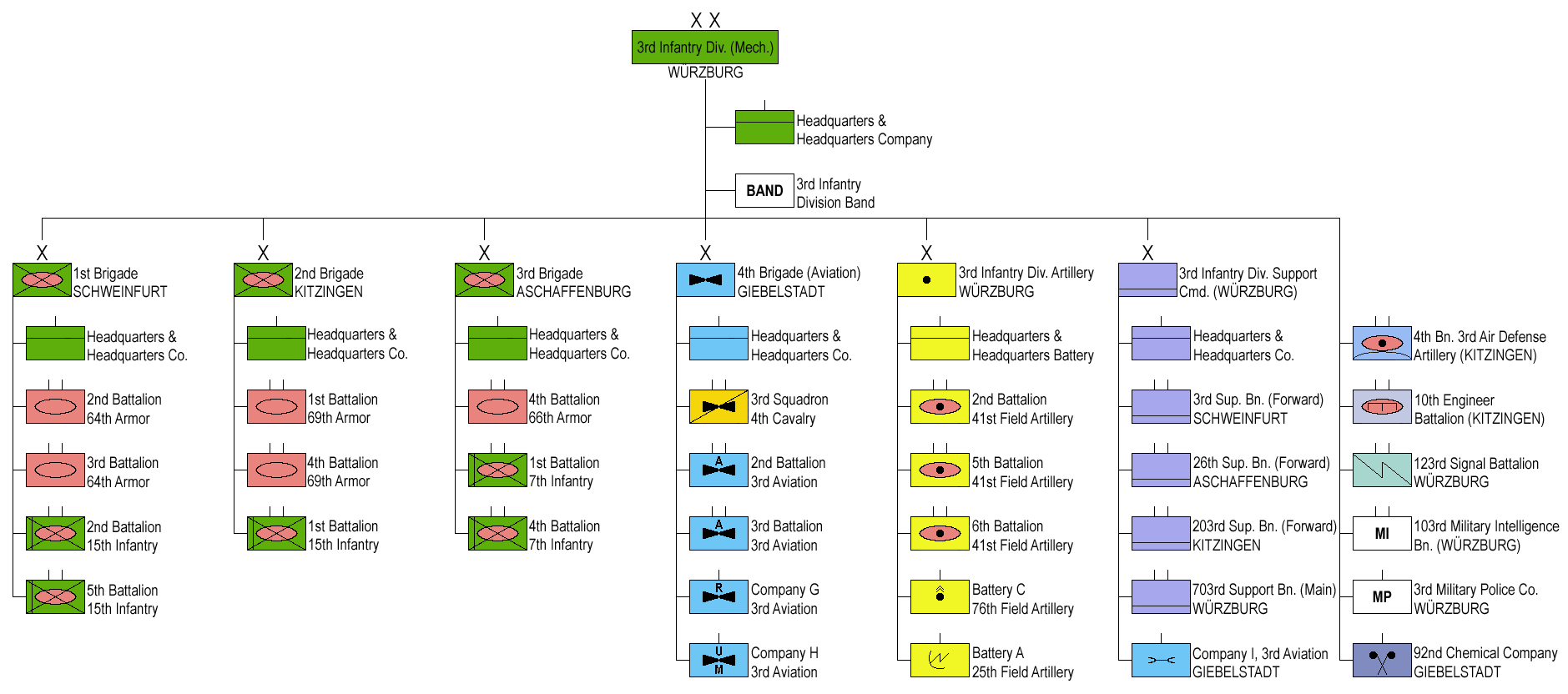
3rd Infantry Division structure 1989 (click to enlarge)

The division was stationed with the V Corps (1958–63, 1992-1996) and VII Corps (1963–92) in West Germany from near the Czech border westward throughout various towns including Würzburg (Div. Hq. & Support Command), Schweinfurt (1st Brigade), Kitzingen (2nd Brigade), and Aschaffenburg (3rd Brigade). In August 1961, a few days after the Berlin Wall was erected, a reinforced company from the 7th Infantry Regiment (a unit of the 3rd Infantry Division) in full battle gear, was ordered to travel along the Autobahn (a major highway) from Aschaffenburg in Bavaria to West Berlin. This was to assert the right of US forces to travel unhindered from West Germany across the western part of East Germany to West Berlin. After the Berlin Wall was built, it was not known if the East German forces would attempt to impede or restrict the movement of US troops when crossing East Germany while trying to reach West Berlin. The unit arrived in West Berlin without incident confirming the right of free passage.

In November 1990, following Iraq's invasion of Kuwait, more than 6,000 3rd Infantry Division men and women deployed with the 1st Armored Division on Operation Desert Storm as part of the Allied Coalition. They participated in the Battle of Medina Ridge which was the second-largest tank battle of the conflict.

Later nearly 1,000 soldiers(one unit-I co. 3rd Aviation Support, 3rd ID) deployed to southeastern Turkey and northern Iraq in Operation Provide Comfort to help Kurdish refugees.

In late Spring of 1991, the division supplied senior ranking officers and non-commissioned officers, along with a military police company to Task Force Victory (Forward). Stationed in Kuwait the Task Force was to provide division-level support to the 11th Armored Cavalry Regiment (which shared the same duty station). Those elements of V Corps attached to the task force (including those of the division) returned to their home units in early September 1991.

As part of the Army's reduction to a ten-division force, the 24th Infantry Division was inactivated on 15 February 1996, and reflagged to become the 3rd Infantry Division.

In 1996 the division was redeployed to Fort Stewart, Fort Benning, and Hunter Army Airfield, Georgia. The division repeatedly demonstrated its deployability since then by maintaining a battalion, and later a brigade task force presence in Kuwait. It has also moved sizable forces to Egypt, Bosnia and Kosovo in partnership training and peacekeeping missions.

In 1996–97, the 3rd Infantry Division Detachment, Rear Tactical Operations Center (RTOC), which is a unit staffed by the Georgia Army National Guard, was mobilized and served in Operation Joint Endeavor. During this time, the 3rd ID RTOC served under the 1st Infantry Division and later the 1st Armored Division. Respectively serving in Bosnia, at Camps Dallas and Angela, near Tuzla under the 1ID, and then in Croatia at Slavonski Brod, under the 1AD, serving as the Assistant Division Commander for Support, then BG George Casey.

=== Twenty-first century ===
==== Invasion of Iraq ====
Early in 2003, the entire division deployed in weeks to Kuwait. It was called on subsequently to spearhead Coalition forces in Operation Iraqi Freedom, fighting its way to Baghdad in early April, destroying Saddam Hussein's government. The First Brigade captured the Baghdad International Airport and cleared and secured the airport, which also resulted in the division's first Medal of Honor since the Korean War, awarded to SFC Paul Ray Smith. Second Brigade, Third Infantry division made the much-publicized "Thunder Run" into downtown Baghdad. The Second Brigade was redeployed to Fallujah, Iraq during the summer of 2003. The division returned to the United States in September 2003.

Order of Battle during the 2003 invasion:

1st Brigade

2nd Battalion, 7th Infantry Regiment (Mech)
3rd Battalion, 7th Infantry Regiment (Mech)
3rd Battalion, 69th Armor Regiment
1st Battalion, 41st Field Artillery Regiment (155SP)

2nd Brigade

3rd Battalion, 15th Infantry Regiment (Mech)
1st Battalion, 64th Armor Regiment
4th Battalion, 64th Armor Regiment (Tuskers)
1st Battalion, 9th Field Artillery Regiment (155SP)

3rd Brigade

203rd Forward Support Battalion (Mech)
1st Battalion, 15th Infantry Regiment (Mech)
1st Battalion, 30th Infantry Regiment (Mech)
2nd Battalion, 69th Armor Regiment
1st Battalion, 10th Field Artillery Regiment (155SP)
1st Battalion, 39th Field Artillery Regiment, 3rd ID DIVARTY, MLRS - Inactivated May, 2006

3rd Squadron, 7th Cavalry Regiment

Beginning in 2004, the division began re-organizing. The division shifted from three maneuver brigades to four "units of action", which were essentially smaller brigade formations, with one infantry, one armor, one cavalry, and one artillery battalion in each. The former Engineer Brigade became the 4th Brigade at Fort Stewart. Each of these units of action engaged in several mock battles at the National Training Center and Joint Readiness Training Center, and preparation for a second deployment to Iraq.

==== OIF III ====
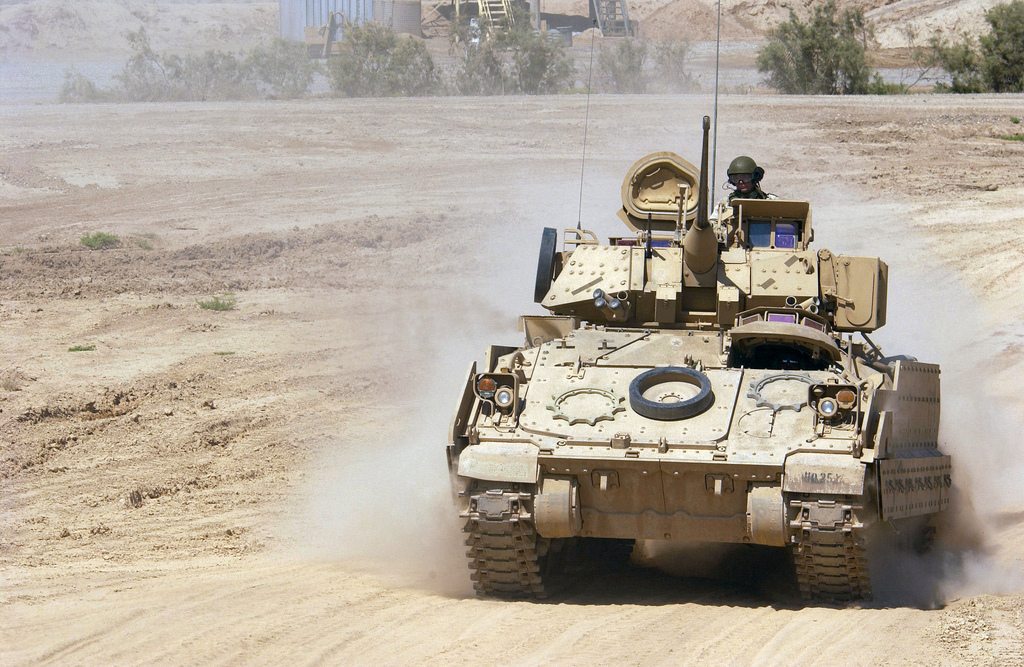
An M2A2 Bradley crew, from the 3rd Infantry Division, drive back to Forward Operating Base Warhorse after a mission near Baqubah, Iraq, May 2005

In January 2005, the division became the first Army division to serve a second tour in Iraq. The division headquarters took control of the Multi-National Division Baghdad (MND-B), headquartered at Camp Liberty and with responsibility for the greater Baghdad area. The First and Third Brigades of the Third Infantry Division were placed under the control of the 42nd Infantry Division, and later under the 101st Airborne Division, in MND-North. In preparation for this deployment, a Fourth Brigade was organized and became the first cohesive brigade combat team sent into a combat zone by the US Army, cohesive in that it fulfilled the table of organization requirement of such a unit. The California Army National Guard's 1st Battalion 184th Infantry Regiment served as one of the brigade's two infantry battalions, as well as the detachment from the Hawaii Army National Guard's 29th Brigade Combat Team, the 2/299th Infantry, also the 48th Brigade Combat Team from the Georgia Army National Guard, 2/130 Infantry Battalion of the Illinois National Guard, and Charlie Company, 1st Battalion, 295th Infantry Battalion from the Puerto Rico Army National Guard served in this Operation.

2/69 Armor was assigned to Camp War Horse in Iraq. By Mid 2005 Primary elements of the 2/69 Armor 3rd Brigade 3rd Infantry Division was redeployed to Ramadi Iraq, replacing elements of the 2nd ID. They ran joint missions with 2nd Marine Division and elements of the Pennsylvania National Guard and the 2/130th Infantry of the Illinois Army National Guard was redeployed to Al Taquattum as the infantry battalion.

3/15 Infantry Battalion was assigned to FOB Hope, a small forward operating base opposite the northeast corner of Sadr City in Baghdad. By late 2005 Task Force 3/15 left FOB Hope and rejoined the 2nd Brigade Combat Team, BCT, at Camp Liberty.

==== OIF V ====
The division redeployed to Fort Stewart and Fort Benning in January 2006. On 17 November 2006, the Army announced that the Third Infantry Division is scheduled to return to Iraq in 2007 and thus become the first Army division to serve three tours in Iraq. The division headquarters became the leading organization of MND-C (Multi-National Division Central), a new command established south of Baghdad as part of the Iraq War troop surge of 2007.

In support of operations in Baghdad, the unit 3rd Squadron, 7th Cavalry was detached from 3ID and assigned by General Petraeus to 3rd BCT, 82nd Airborne who was under the command of the 1st Cavalry Division. In 2008, the 82nd Airborne and 1st CAV redeployed home, and 3–7 CAV was handed over to 3rd BCT, 4th Infantry Division under the command of the 25th Infantry Division. They would remain under this command until 3–7 CAV's redeployment back to Fort Stewart, being reattached to the 3rd Infantry Division. Similarly, 1st Battalion, 64th Armor was detached from 3ID and attached to 2nd BCT, 1st Infantry Division under 1st Cavalry Division, and later under 2nd BCT, 101st Airborne Division under command of 4th Infantry Division.

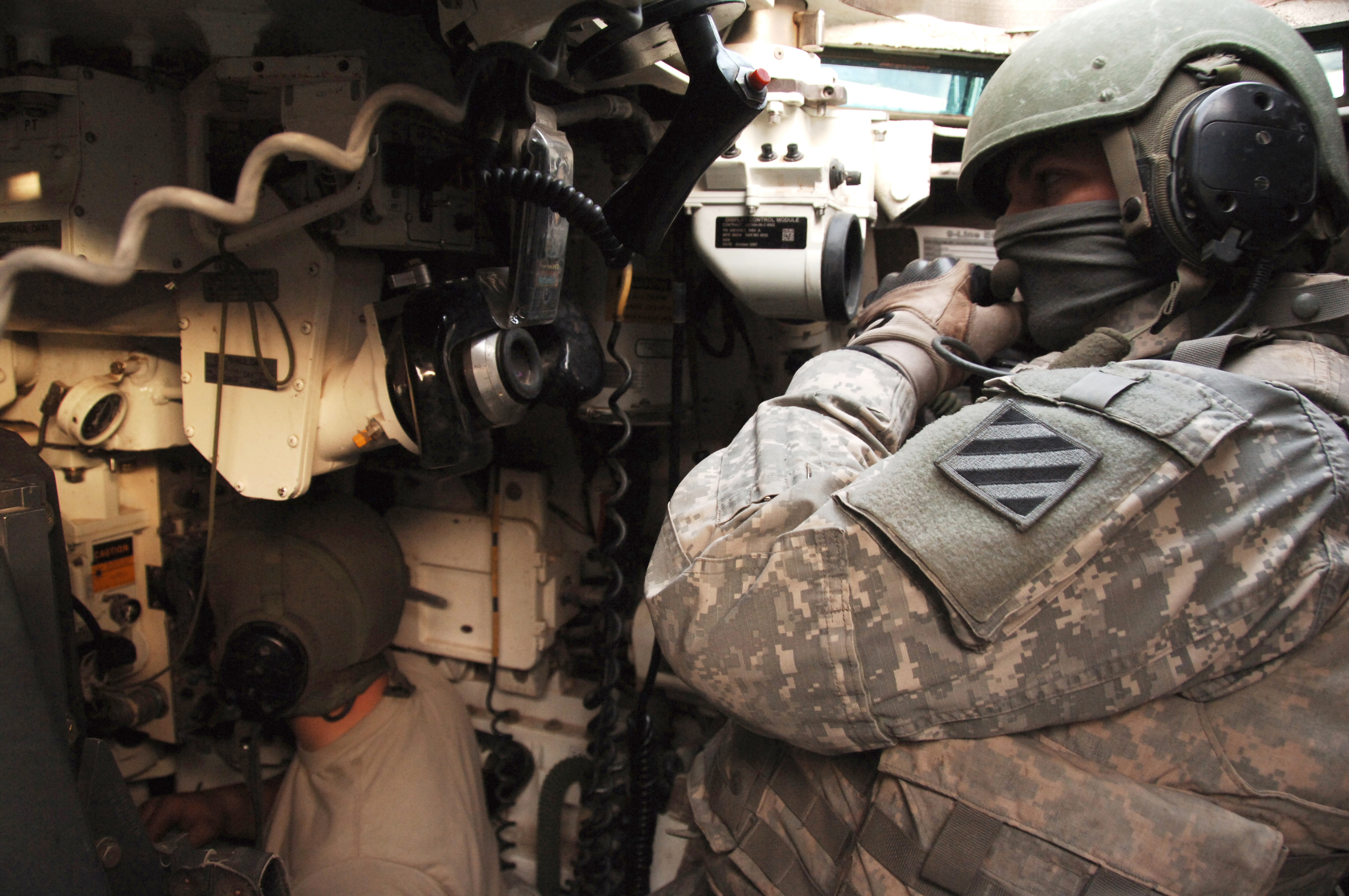
3rd Infantry Division Soldiers in an M1A1 Abrams conduct a counter improvised explosive device (IED) mission in Baghdad, Iraq, 22 December 2007.

==== Reassignment of 1st Brigade ====
In the fall of 2008, the 3rd Infantry Division's 1st Brigade was assigned to serve as the on-call federal response force under the control of United States Northern Command, the combatant command assigned responsibility for the continental United States. The brigade remained at its home station of Fort Stewart, Georgia, and "is training to deploy domestically in response to terrorist attacks or other national emergencies." The brigade will be trained in responding to WMD attacks, crowd control, and dealing with civil unrest.

The force was renamed "Chemical, biological, radiological, nuclear, or high-yield explosive Consequence Management Response Force". Its acronym, CCMRF, is pronounced "see-smurf", and the unit is now under the daily control of United States Northern Command's Army North, whose mission is to "protect the United States homeland and support local, state, and federal authorities." The unit is a multi-branch force with servicemembers from the four branches of the United States Department of Defense.

==== Reorganization of 4th Brigade ====
In March 2009, 4th Brigade reorganized from a mechanized or heavy brigade to a light infantry brigade. As part of this reorganization, 4th Battalion, 64th Armor was reflagged as 3rd Battalion, 15th Infantry Regiment.

==== OIF VII ====
The 3rd Infantry Division assumed command of the Multi-National Division-North in October 2009. This milestone marked the division's fourth tour in support of Operation Iraqi Freedom (I, III, V, and VII). The division had elements operating in every area of Iraq as the mission changes from Operation Iraqi Freedom to Operation New Dawn on 1 September 2010. With the advent of Operation New Dawn, the focus shifted from combat operations to stability and advise and assist operations throughout Iraq. During the deployment the higher headquarters Multi-National Force-Iraq was replaced by United States Forces - Iraq and the division became United States Division - North.

In the course of Operation Iraqi Freedom up until 24 September 2010, 436 members of the division were killed in action.

==== Operation Enduring Freedom ====
An Infantryman with Bravo Company, 3rd Battalion, 15th Infantry Regiment, 4th Infantry Brigade Combat Team, carries an M240L machine gun while on a foot patrol in Wardak province, Afghanistan, 2013

The division sent multiple elements to serve repeatedly during the War in Afghanistan (2001-2021). The Combat Aviation Brigade, 3rd Infantry Division deployed to Afghanistan for a 13-month tour in 2010. The brigade was the first unit from 3ID to deploy to Afghanistan. During that tour 3rd CAB soldiers flew about 26,000 missions, including 800 air assaults, and were responsible for about 2,500 enemy casualties.

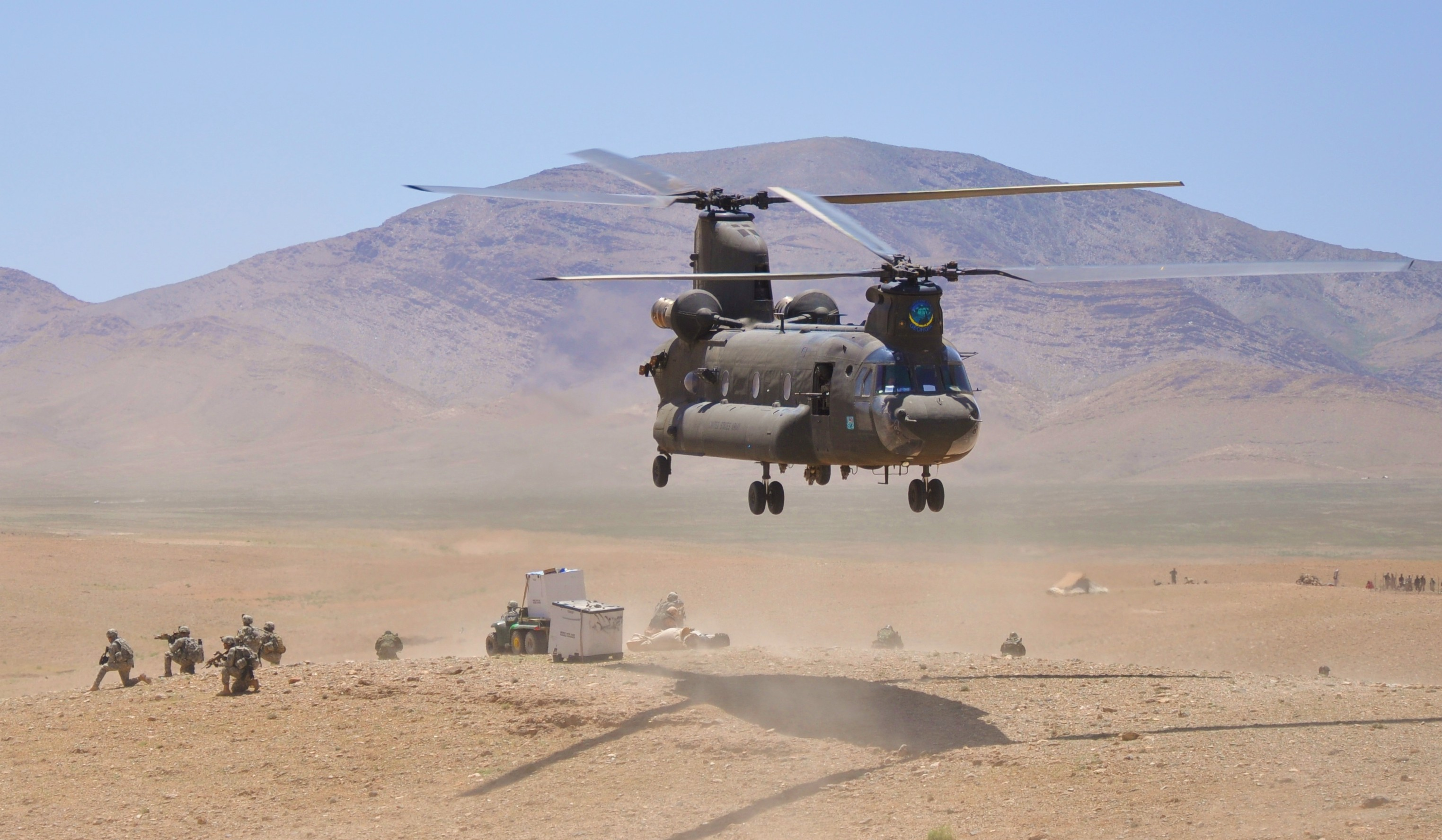
Soldiers of Task Force Brawler conduct a Commander's Emergency Response Program mission, 3rd Combat Aviation Brigade (CAB) Air-Ground Mission, Regional Command – East, 2010.

3rd CAB was planned to deploy to Afghanistan again in January 2013. The 2500 soldiers were planned to deploy with the 3rd Special Troops Battalion for a 9-month tour. The Marne Air was planned to operate out of Kandahar Airfield in the Regional Command South area, relieving the 25th CAB.

Both the 3rd CAB and 3rd STB were planned to fall under their parent division when the 3ID Headquarters and Headquarters Battalion deployed in August 2013 and was planned to take over command of RC-South from HQ 82nd Airborne Division.

The 2nd Heavy BCT's two combined-arms battalions were also deployed individually to Afghanistan. 1st Battalion, 64th Armor Regiment deployed in March 2012. They were attached to the 3rd Stryker Brigade, 2nd Infantry Division (United States) from Joint Base Lewis-McChord, WA, to help train Afghan National Army forces to take over responsibility for security. 1st Battalion, 30th Infantry Regiment deployed a month earlier. They were tasked with providing security to units conducting contingency operations. Both battalions were planned to serve a nine-month tour.

In December 2012, the 3rd Sustainment Brigade deployed for its fifth deployment over the last decade and first to Afghanistan, for nine months in support of Operation Enduring Freedom 12–13, let by Colonel Ron Novack and CSM Daniels. Deployed to Kandahar with 276 soldiers the brigade provided sustainment and retrograde support to the 3rd and 4th Infantry Divisions, 1st and 2nd Marine Expeditionary Forces, and International Security Assistance Forces operating in Regional Commands South, Southwest, and National Support Element-West. The brigade assisted in the closure and transfer of over 61 Forward Operating Bases while simultaneously providing sustainment to the force. Additionally, the 3rd Sustainment Brigade provided direct support to the 1st and 2nd Brigade Combat Teams and the Combat Aviation Brigade of the 3rd Infantry Division.

In February 2013, the 4th Infantry Brigade Combat Team, 3rd Infantry Division (later reflagged as the 2nd Infantry Brigade Combat Team, 3rd Infantry Division), deployed to Logar Province and Wardak Province in Afghanistan. 6th Squadron, 8th Cavalry Regiment was tasked with securing Logar Province, and disrupting the almost daily rocket attacks on Forward Operation Base Shank. 3rd Battalion, 15th Infantry Regiment was tasked with securing Wardak Province's highly volatile Highway 1. The soldiers of 4th Infantry Brigade Combat Team, 3rd Infantry Division returned home in late November 2013 after serving a 9-month tour.

==== Operation Freedom's Sentinel ====
In April 2017, Military.com reported that about 200 soldiers from the 3rd Infantry Division Headquarters will deploy to Afghanistan to replace the 1st Cavalry Division Headquarters at Bagram Airfield taking over command of the U.S. Forces-Afghanistan's National Support Element, as part of Operation Freedom's Sentinel.

Starting in December 2018 troops of the Georgia Army National Guard's 48th IBCT of the 3rd Infantry Division were deployed in support of NATO operations in Afghanistan. These missions included train, advising, assist missions for the Afghanistan military as well as attaching infantry units from the 3rd Battalion, 121st Infantry Regiment to Army Special Forces ODAs and other Special Operations forces.

=== Operation Atlantic Resolve ===
In February 2015, ArmyTimes reported that More than 3,000 soldiers from the 1st Heavy Brigade Combat Team, 3rd Combat Aviation Brigade, 3rd ID's Artillery and other units of the 3rd Infantry Division began an accumulative of 12 months deployment to Europe in March 2015 in support of Operation Atlantic Resolve. Soldiers from 3rd ID deployed to various European countries including Germany, Estonia, Latvia, Lithuania, Poland, Romania and Bulgaria with the 1st Brigade acting as the European Rotational Force and NATO Response Force, which works and trains with NATO allies to remain prepared for contingency operations within the European Command's area of responsibility.

In March 2025, four soldiers from the 3rd Infantry Division's 1st Brigade went missing from a training area near Pabrade, close to Lithuania's eastern border with Belarus.

== Division organization ==
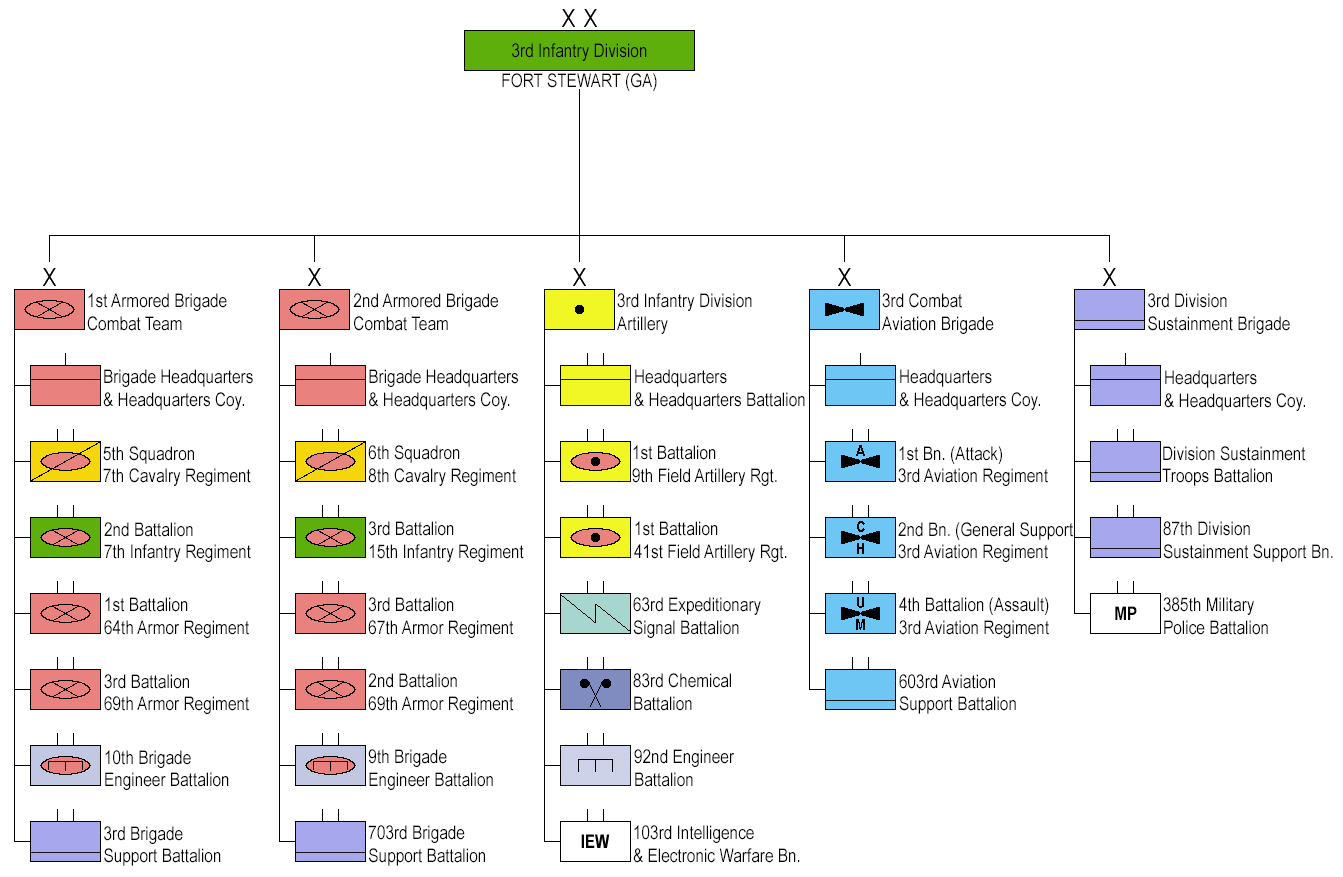
3rd Infantry Division organization December 2025

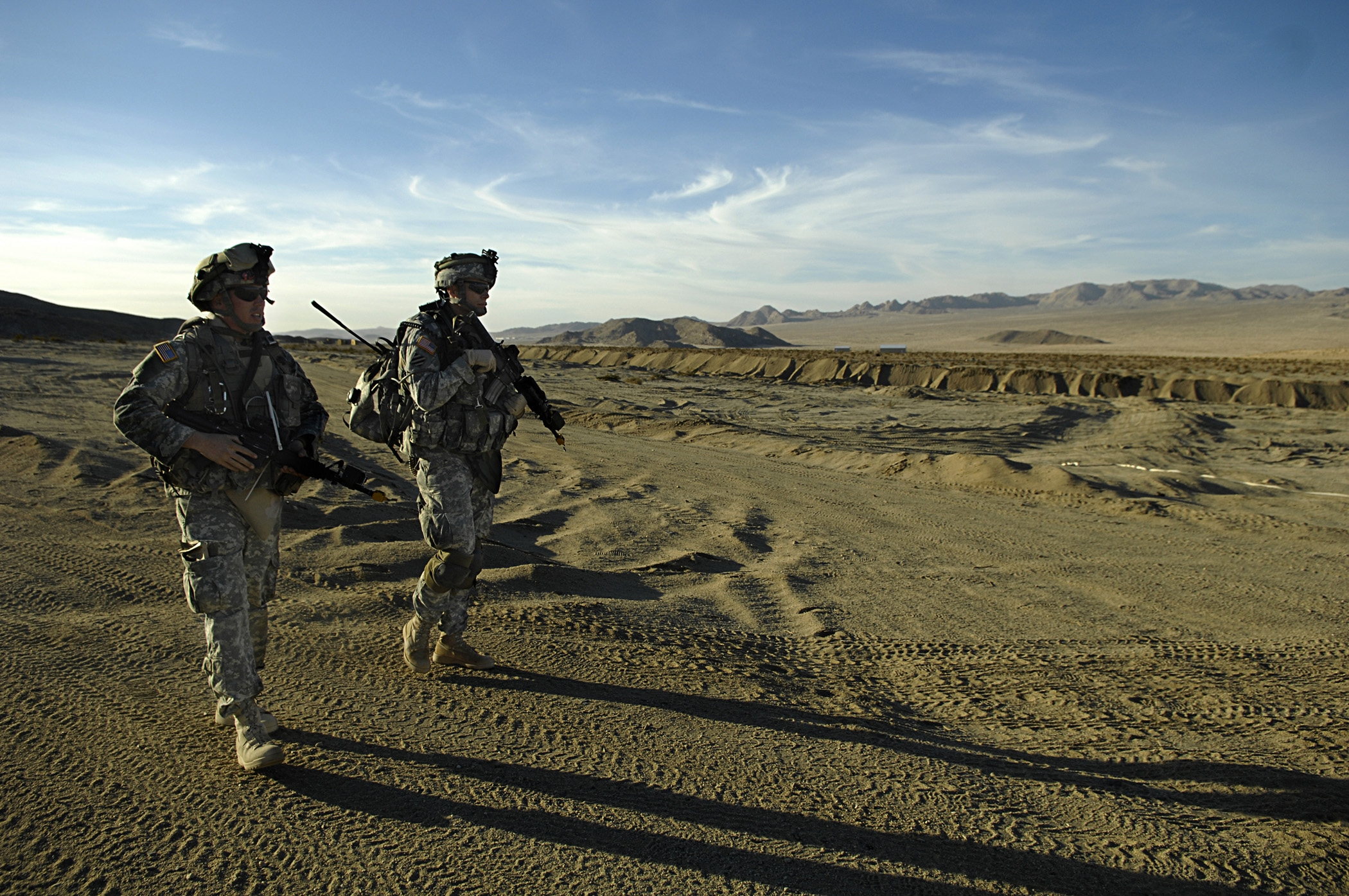
Soldiers from the 3rd Squadron, 1st Cavalry Regiment, 3rd Heavy Brigade Combat Team of the 3rd Infantry training at Fort Irwin

The 3rd Infantry Division consists of a division headquarters battalion, two armored brigade combat teams, a division artillery headquarters, a division sustainment brigade, and a combat aviation brigade. All units are based at Fort Stewart. The field artillery battalions remain connected to their brigade combat teams.

- 3rd Infantry Division
  - 1st Armored Brigade Combat Team, "Raider"
    - Headquarters and Headquarters Company
    - 5th Squadron, 7th Cavalry Regiment–Reconnaissance, surveillance, and target acquisition "Warpaint"
    - 2nd Battalion, 7th Infantry Regiment "Cottonbalers"
    - 1st Battalion, 64th Armor Regiment "Desert Rogue"
    - 3rd Battalion, 69th Armor Regiment "Speed & Power"
    - 10th Brigade Engineer Battalion "Bridge the Sky"
    - 3rd Brigade Support Battalion "Ready to Roll"
  - 2nd Armored Brigade Combat Team "Spartans"
    - Headquarters and Headquarters Company
    - 6th Squadron, 8th Cavalry Regiment "Mustang"
    - 3rd Battalion, 15th Infantry Regiment "Old China Hands"
    - 3rd Battalion, 67th Armor Regiment "Hounds of Hell"
    - 2nd Battalion, 69th Armor Regiment "Panthers"
    - 9th Brigade Engineer Battalion "Gila"
    - 703rd Brigade Support Battalion "Maintain"
  - 3rd Infantry Division Artillery "Marne Thunder"
    - Headquarters and Headquarters Battalion (former Division Headquarters and Headquarters Battalion)
    - 1st Battalion, 9th Field Artillery Regiment "Battlekings"
    - 1st Battalion, 41st Field Artillery Regiment "Glory's Guns"
    - 63rd Expeditionary Signal Battalion
    - 83rd Chemical Battalion (assigned to the division as part of the Army 2030 reform)
    - 92nd Engineer Battalion (assigned to the division as part of the Army 2030 reform)
    - 103rd Intelligence and Electronic Warfare Battalion (reactivated 16 September 2022 as part of the Army 2030 reform)
  - 3rd Combat Aviation Brigade "Falcon"
    - Headquarters and Headquarters Company "Talons"
    - 1st Battalion (Attack), 3rd Aviation Regiment (AH-64D/AH-64DW) "Vipers"
    - 2nd Battalion (General Support), 3rd Aviation Regiment (UH-60A/UH-60L/CH-47) "Knighthawk"
    - 4th Battalion (Assault), 3rd Aviation Regiment (UH-60M) "Brawler"
    - 603rd Aviation Support Battalion "Work Horse"
  - 3rd Division Sustainment Brigade
    - Headquarters and Headquarters Company
    - Division Sustainment Troops Battalion
    - 87th Division Sustainment Support Battalion
    - 385th Military Police Battalion

The 2nd Brigade Combat Team was inactivated on 15 January 2015 as part of the Army's modular brigade reorganization. Special Troops Battalion; 3rd Squadron, 7th Cavalry Regiment; 1st Battalion, 9th Field Artillery Regiment; and 26th Brigade Support Battalion were inactivated concurrently, with some of their companies joining other brigades' battalions. The maneuver battalions of the 2nd Brigade Combat Team moved to other brigades in the division: 1st Battalion, 64th Armor Regiment moved to the 1st Brigade Combat Team and the 1st Battalion, 30th Infantry Regiment moved to the 4th Brigade Combat Team. With the inactivation of the 2nd Brigade Combat Team, the 4th Brigade Combat Team was reflagged as the 2nd Brigade Combat Team. After the reorganization, the division had three BCTs, each with three maneuver battalions.

The 42nd Fires Brigade was activated at Fort Stewart on 17 October 2013 and later reflagged as 3rd Infantry Division Artillery. Division Artillery has training oversight of the division's artillery battalions, although the battalions remain organic to their respective BCTs.

As part of budget-driven downsizing, the Army announced that it would inactivate the 3rd Brigade Combat Team by the end of 2015 and replace it with a Battalion Task Force centered around the 1st Battalion, 28th Infantry. The 3rd Brigade Combat Team was inactivated on 15 December 2015.

== Lineage and honors ==
=== Division ===
- Constituted 12 November 1917 in the Regular Army as Headquarters, 3d Division
- Organized 21 November 1917 at Camp Greene, North Carolina
- Redesignated 1 August 1942 as Headquarters, 3d Infantry Division
- Reorganized and redesignated 1 April 1960 as Headquarters and Headquarters Company, 3d Infantry Division
- Reorganized and redesignated 16 May 2004 as Headquarters and Tactical Command Posts, 3d Infantry Division
- Reorganized and redesignated 16 November 2010 as Headquarters and Headquarters Battalion, 3d Infantry Division

==== Campaign participation credit ====
World War I

- Aisne
- Champagne-Marne
- Aisne-Marne
- Saint-Mihiel
- Meuse-Argonne
- Champagne 1918

World War II

- Algeria-French Morocco (with arrowhead)
- Tunisia
- Sicily (with arrowhead)
- Naples-Foggia
- Anzio (with arrowhead)
- Rome-Arno
- Southern France (with arrowhead)
- Rhineland
- Ardennes-Alsace
- Central Europe

Korean War

- CCF Intervention
- First UN Counteroffensive
- CCF Spring Offensive
- UN Summer-Fall Offensive
- Second Korean Winter
- Korea, Summer-Fall 1952
- Third Korean Winter
- Korea, Summer 1953

1st Gulf War

- Operation Desert Shield
- Operation Desert Storm

War on Terrorism

- Liberation of Iraq
- Transition of Iraq
- Iraqi Governance
- National Resolution
- Iraqi Surge

==== Decorations ====
Ribbon	Award	Year	Notes
Dark blue ribbon with a gold border	Presidential Unit Citation (Army)	1945	Streamer embroidered COLMAR
Dark blue ribbon with a gold border	Presidential Unit Citation (Army)	2003	Streamer embroidered IRAQ 2003
Red ribbon	Meritorious Unit Commendation	2007–2008	Streamer embroidered IRAQ 2007-2008
Red ribbon	Meritorious Unit Commendation	2009–2010	Streamer embroidered IRAQ 2009-2010
Red ribbon	Meritorious Unit Commendation	2012–2013	Streamer embroidered AFGHANISTAN 2012-2013
Red ribbon with vertical green stripes in the center and a palm leaf in the middle	French Croix de guerre with Palm	1945	Streamer embroidered COLMAR
Red and Green woven citation cord with brass tip	French Fourragère in the colors of the Croix de guerre	1945	Fourragère
White ribbon with vertical green and red stripes on its edges and a red and blue circle in the middle	Presidential Unit Citation (Korea)	1951	Streamer embroidered UIJONGBU CORRIDOR
White ribbon with vertical green and red stripes on its edges and a red and blue circle in the middle	Presidential Unit Citation (Korea)	1953	Streamer embroidered IRON TRIANGLE
The streamer has five alternating stripes (3 blue and two white) with the inscription in yellow	Chryssoun Aristion Andrias (Bravery Gold Medal of Greece)	1950–1953	Streamer embroidered KOREA

=== Division Artillery ===
- Constituted 12 November 1917 in the Regular Army as Headquarters, 3rd Field Artillery Brigade, and assigned to the 3rd Division
- Organized 26 November 1917 at Camp Stanley, Texas
- Disbanded 16 October 1939 at Fort Lewis, Washington
- Reconstituted 1 October 1940 in the Regular Army as Headquarters and Headquarters Battery, 3rd Division Artillery, and activated at Fort Lewis, Washington
- Redesignated 1 July 1957 as Headquarters and Headquarters Battery, 3rd Infantry Division Artillery

==== Campaign participation credit ====
World War I

- Champagne-Marne
- Aisne-Marne
- Saint-Mihiel
- Meuse-Argonne
- Champagne 1918

World War II

- Algeria-French Morocco (with arrowhead)
- Tunisia
- Sicily (with arrowhead)
- Naples-Foggia
- Anzio (with arrowhead)
- Rome-Arno
- Southern France (with arrowhead)
- Rhineland
- Ardennes-Alsace
- Central Europe

Korean War

- Chinese Communist Forces Intervention
- First United Nations Counteroffensive
- Chinese Communist Forces Spring Offensive
- United Nations Summer-Fall Offensive
- Second Korean Winter
- Korea, Summer-Fall 1952
- Third Korean Winter
- Korea, Summer 1953

==== Decorations ====
Ribbon	Award	Year	Notes
Dark blue ribbon with a gold border	Presidential Unit Citation (Army)	1945	Streamer embroidered COLMAR
Red ribbon	Meritorious Unit Commendation	2007–2008	Streamer embroidered IRAQ 2007-2008
Red ribbon with vertical green stripes in the center and a palm leaf in the middle	French Croix de guerre with Palm	1945	Streamer embroidered COLMAR
Red and Green woven citation cord with brass tip	French Fourragère in the colors of the Croix de guerre	1945	Fourragère
White ribbon with vertical green and red stripes on its edges and a red and blue circle in the middle	Presidential Unit Citation (Korea)	1951	Streamer embroidered UIJONGBU CORRIDOR
White ribbon with vertical green and red stripes on its edges and a red and blue circle in the middle	Presidential Unit Citation (Korea)	1953	Streamer embroidered IRON TRIANGLE
The streamer has five alternating stripes (3 blue and two white) with the inscription in yellow	Chryssoun Aristion Andrias (Bravery Gold Medal of Greece)	1950–1953	Streamer embroidered KOREA

=== Combat Aviation Brigade ===
Constituted 16 March 1985 in the Regular Army as Headquarters and Headquarters Company, Aviation Brigade, 3rd Infantry Division, and activated in Germany.

==== Campaign participation credit ====
War on Terrorism

Iraq

- Liberation of Iraq
- Iraqi Governance
- National Resolution
- Iraqi Surge

Afghanistan

- Consolidation II
- Consolidation III
- Transition I

==== Decorations ====
Ribbon	Award	Year	Notes
Dark blue ribbon with a gold border	Presidential Unit Citation (Army)	2003	Streamer embroidered IRAQ 2003
Red ribbon	Meritorious Unit Commendation	2005	Streamer embroidered IRAQ 2005
Red ribbon	Meritorious Unit Commendation	2007–2008	Streamer embroidered IRAQ 2007-2008
Red ribbon	Meritorious Unit Commendation	2009–2010	Streamer embroidered AFGHANISTAN 2009-2010
Red ribbon	Meritorious Unit Commendation	2012–2013	Streamer embroidered AFGHANISTAN 2012-2013

=== Division Band ===
- Constituted 20 August 1943 in the Regular Army as the Band, 3rd Infantry Division
- Redesignated 1 December 1943 as the 3d Infantry Division Band and activated in North Africa
- Consolidated 20 March 1963 with Headquarters and Headquarters Detachment, 3rd Infantry Division Trains, and consolidated unit reorganized and redesignated as Headquarters, Headquarters and Band, 3rd Infantry Division Support Command.
- Reorganized and redesignated 15 March 1968 as Headquarters, Headquarters Company and Band, 3rd Infantry Division Support Command.
- Band element withdrawn 21 May 1972 from Headquarters, Headquarters Company and Band, 3rd Infantry Division Support Command, and absorbed by the 3d Adjutant General Company
- Band element withdrawn 1 October 1984 from the 3d Adjutant General Company and redesignated as the 3rd Infantry Division Band.

==== Campaign participation credit ====
World War I

- Aisne
- Champagne-Marne
- Aisne-Marne
- Saint-Mihiel
- Meuse-Argonne
- Champagne 1918

World War II – EAME

- Algeria-French Morocco (with arrowhead)
- Tunisia
- Sicily (with arrowhead)
- Naples-Foggia
- Anzio (with arrowhead)
- Rome-Arno
- Southern France (with arrowhead)
- Rhineland
- Ardennes-Alsace
- Central Europe

Korean War

- Chinese Communist Forces Intervention
- First United Nations Counteroffensive
- Chinese Communist Forces Spring Offensive
- United Nations Summer-Fall Offensive
- Second Korean Winter
- Korea, Summer-Fall 1952
- Third Korean Winter
- Korea, Summer 1953

War on Terror

- Liberation of Iraq
- Transition of Iraq
- Iraqi Governance
- National Resolution
- Iraqi Surge
- Iraqi Sovereignty
- New Dawn

==== Decorations ====
Ribbon	Award	Year	Notes
Dark blue ribbon with a gold border	Presidential Unit Citation (Army)	1945	Streamer embroidered COLMAR
Dark blue ribbon with a gold border	Presidential Unit Citation (Army)	2003	Streamer embroidered IRAQ 2003
Red ribbon	Meritorious Unit Commendation	1951–1952	Streamer embroidered KOREA 1951–1952
Red ribbon with vertical green stripes in the center and a palm leaf in the middle	French Croix de guerre with Palm	1945	Streamer embroidered COLMAR
Red and green woven citation cord with brass tip	French Fourragère in the colors of the Croix de guerre	1945	Fourragère
White ribbon with vertical green and red stripes on its edges and a red and blue circle in the middle	Republic of Korea Presidential Unit Citation	1951	Streamer embroidered UIJONGBU CORRIDOR
White ribbon with vertical green and red stripes on its edges and a red and blue circle in the middle	Republic of Korea Presidential Unit Citation	1953	Streamer embroidered IRON TRIANGLE
The streamer has five alternating stripes (3 blue and two white) with the inscription in yellow	Chryssoun Aristion Andrias (Bravery Gold Medal of Greece)	1950–1953	Streamer embroidered KOREA

== Notable members ==
Lloyd Austin	General	3d Division	Iraq	General officer
David G. Perkins	General	3d Division	Iraq	General officer
Robert B. Abrams	General	3d Division	Iraq	Son of General Creighton Abrams
Lucian Adams	Staff Sergeant	30th Infantry	World War II	Medal of Honor
Sylvester Antolak	Sergeant	15th Infantry	World War II	Medal of Honor
James Arness	Private	7th Infantry	World War II	Actor
John L. Barkley	Private First Class	4th Infantry	World War I	Medal of Honor
Stanley Bender	Staff Sergeant	7th Infantry	World War II	Medal of Honor
Emory L. Bennett	Private First Class	15th Infantry	Korea	Medal of Honor
Maurice L. Britt	Captain	30th Infantry	World War II	Medal of Honor
Edward H. Brooks	Lieutenant General	76th Field Artillery	World War I	Distinguished Service Cross
Preston Brown	Brigadier General	3d Division	World War I	Distinguished Service Medal
Frank Burke	Major	15th Infantry	World War II	Medal of Honor
Agustín Ramos Calero	Sergeant First Class	65th Infantry	World War II	Most decorated Hispanic soldier of WW II
Herbert F. Christian	Private	15th Infantry	World War II	Medal of Honor
Garlin Murl Conner	First Lieutenant	7th Infantry	World War II	Distinguished Service Cross
James P. Connor	Sergeant	7th Infantry	World War II	Medal of Honor
Robert Craig	Second Lieutenant	15th Infantry	World War II	Medal of Honor
Jerry K. Crump	Master Sergeant	7th Infantry	Korea	Medal of Honor
Michael J. Daly	Captain	15th Infantry	World War II	Medal of Honor
Rudolph B. Davila	First Lieutenant	7th Infantry	World War II	Medal of Honor
Joseph T. Dickman	Major General	3d Division	World War I	First commander of the 3d Division
Russell E. Dunham	Technical Sergeant	30th Infantry	World War II	Medal of Honor
John W. Dutko	First Sergeant	30th Infantry	World War II	Medal of Honor
Dwight D. Eisenhower	General of the Army	15th Infantry	World War I	President of the United States
John Essebagger, Jr.	Corporal	7th Infantry	Korea	Medal of Honor
Eric G. Gibson	Technician Fifth Grade	30th Infantry	World War II	Medal of Honor
Charles L. Gilliland	Corporal	7th Infantry	Korea	Medal of Honor
Clair Goodblood	Corporal	7th Infantry	Korea	Medal of Honor
John R. Guthrie	General	3d Division	Korea	General officer
Charles P. Hall	Lieutenant General	3d Division	World War II	Principal commander during the Battle of Bataan
Lloyd C. Hawks	Sergeant First Class	30th Infantry	World War II	Medal of Honor
George Price Hays	Lieutenant General	10th Field Artillery	World War I	Medal of Honor
Robert Lee Howze	Major General	3d Division	World War I	Medal of Honor (while in 6th U.S. Cavalry)
Elden H. Johnson	Private	15th Infantry	World War II	Medal of Honor
Harold Keith Johnson	General	7th Infantry	Korea	Army Chief of Staff
Victor L. Kandle	First Lieutenant	15th Infantry	World War II	Medal of Honor
Gus Kefurt	Staff Sergeant	15th Infantry	World War II	Medal of Honor
Patrick L. Kessler	Private First Class	30th Infantry	World War II	Medal of Honor
Richard D. Kisling	Chief Master Sergeant of the Air Force	3d Division	World War II	Third Chief Master Sergeant of the Air Force
Alton W. Knappenberger	Private First Class	3d Division	World War II	Medal of Honor
Noah O. Knight	Private First Class	7th Infantry	Korea	Medal of Honor
Darwin K. Kyle	Second Lieutenant	7th Infantry	Korea	Medal of Honor
Floyd K. Lindstrom	Private First Class	7th Infantry	World War II	Medal of Honor
John P. Lucas	Major General	3d Division	World War II	Distinguished Service Medal
Robert D. Maxwell	Technician Fifth Grade	7th Infantry	World War II	Medal of Honor
Leroy A. Mendonca	Sergeant	7th Infantry	World War II	Medal of Honor
Joseph F. Merrell	Private	15th Infantry	World War II	Medal of Honor
Harold O. Messerschmidt	Sergeant	30th Infantry	World War II	Medal of Honor
James H. Mills	Corporal	15th Infantry	World War II	Medal of Honor
Hiroshi H. Miyamura	Staff Sergeant, Honorary Sergeant Major	7th Infantry	Korea	Medal of Honor
Ola L. Mize	Colonel	15th Infantry	Korea	Medal of Honor
Audie L. Murphy	Major	15th Infantry	World War II	Medal of Honor, actor
Charles P. Murray, Jr.	Colonel	30th Infantry	World War II	Medal of Honor
John W. O'Daniel	Lieutenant General	3d Division	World War II	Distinguished Service Cross
Arlo L. Olson	Captain	15th Infantry	World War II	Medal of Honor
Truman O. Olson	Sergeant	7th Infantry	World War II	Medal of Honor
Forrest E. Peden	Technician Fifth Grade	10th Field Artillery	World War II	Medal of Honor
Charles F. Pendleton	Corporal	15th Infantry	Korea	Medal of Honor
Wilburn K. Ross	Master Sergeant	350th Infantry	World War II	Medal of Honor
Henry Schauer	Technical Sergeant	3d Division	World War II	Medal of Honor
William R. Schmidt	Major General	3d Division	World War II	3d ID commander
George J. Schultz	Private First Class	30th Infantry	World War II	Distinguished Service Cross
Donald K. Schwab	First Lieutenant	3rd Division	World War II	Medal of Honor
Paul Ray Smith	Sergeant First Class	11th Engineer	GWOT-Iraq	Medal of Honor
John C. Squires	Sergeant	30th Infantry	World War II	Medal of Honor
John J. Tominac	Colonel	15th Infantry	World War II	Medal of Honor
Lucian Truscott	General	3d Division	World War II	General officer
Jose F. Valdez	Private First Class	7th Infantry	World War II	Medal of Honor
Keith L. Ware	Major General	15th Infantry	World War II	Medal of Honor
David C. Waybur	First Lieutenant	3d Division	World War II	Medal of Honor
Frederick C. Weyand	General	7th Infantry	Korea	Army Chief of Staff
Eli Whiteley	Captain	15th Infantry	World War II	Medal of Honor
John A. Wickham, Jr.	General	1st Brigade	Korea	Army Chief of Staff
Stanley Brach	Staff Sergeant	15th Infantry	World War II	Silver Star
Alwyn Cashe	Sergeant First Class	15th Infantry	GWOT-Iraq	Medal of Honor

|- |Edward H Winchell Jr |Staff Sergeant |7 Infantry |World War II |Silver Star |}

== Division song ==
"Dogface Soldier"

I wouldn't give a bean,
To be a fancy-pants Marine.
I'd rather be a dog-faced Soldier like I am
I wouldn't trade my old ODs
For all the Navy's dungarees
For I'm the walking pride of Uncle Sam
On Army posters that I read it says
Be all that you can!
So they're tearing me down
To build me over again
I'm just a dog-faced Soldier
With a rifle on my shoulder
I eat raw meat for breakfast every day!
So feed me ammunition!
Keep me in the Third Division
For a dog-faced Soldier's A-OK!

== See also ==
- 92nd Engineer Battalion
- 256th Infantry Brigade – US Army unit attached to 3rd ID in OIF III.
- Baker Boys: Inside the Surge – 2010 documentary about a company in 3rd ID.
- Dogface – term referring to soldiers of the 3rd ID.
- Heavy Metal: a Tank Company's Battle to Baghdad – 2005 book co-written by former 3rd ID company commander.
- Over There – 2005 fictional television series about a 3rd ID unit.
- To Hell and Back – 1955 film based on Audie Murphy's 1949 autobiographical novel.

== Bibliography ==
- American Battle Monuments Commission. American Armies and Battlefields in Europe. Washington: Government Printing Office, 1938. Reprint. Washington: Government Printing Office, 1992.
- American Battle Monuments Commission. 3d Division Summary of Operations in the World War. Washington: Government Printing Office, 1944.
- Appleman, Roy E. South to the Naktong, North to the Yalu, June–November 1950. United States Army in the Korean War. Washington: Government Printing Office, 1961, 1986.
- "Blue and White Devils: The Story of the 3rd Infantry Division". 1945.
- Blumenson, Martin. Salerno to Cassino. United States Army in World War II. Washington: Government Printing Office, 1969, 1988.
- Cairns, Bogardus S. "The Breakout at Anzio: A Lesson in Tank-Infantry Cooperation." Military Review 28 (January 1949):23–32.
- Clarke, Jeffrey J., and Smith, Robert Ross. Riviera to the Rhine. United States Army in World War II. Washington: Government Printing Office, 1993.
- Crawford, Charles. Six Months with the 6th Brigade. Kansas City: E. B. Barnett, 1928.
- Dickman, Joseph T. The Great Crusade: A Narrative of the World War. New York: D. Appleton and Co., 1927.
- Dolcater, Max W., ed. 3rd Infantry Division in Korea. Tokyo: Toppan Printing Co., 1953.
- "A Fiftieth for the Marne Division." Army Digest 22 (November 1967):22.
- Fisher, Ernest F., Jr. Cassino to the Alps. United States Army in World War II. Washington: Government Printing Office, 1977, 1989.
- Garland, Albert N., and Smyth, Howard McGaw. Sicily and the Surrender of Italy. United States Army in World War II. Washington: Government Printing Office, 1965. 1991.
- Gaul, Jeffrey. History of the Third Infantry Division: Rock of the Marne. Paducah, Kentucky: Turner Publishing, 1988.
- Golden, Joe E. "Third U.S. Infantry Division in Italy." Military Review 24 (June 1944):5–10.
- Hemenway, Frederick Vinton, ed. and comp. History of the Third Division, United States Army in the World War, For the period 1 December 1917 to 1 January 1919. Cologne, Germany: M. DuMont Schauberg, 1919.
- Hermes, Walter G. Truce Tent and Fighting Front. United States Army in the Korean War. Washington: Government Printing Office, 1966, 1988.
- Historical Division, Department of the Army. Anzio Beachhead (22 January-25 May 1944). American Forces in Action. Washington: Government Printing Office, 1948, 1990.
- Historical Section, Army War College. Order of Battle of the United States Land Forces in the World War: American Expeditionary Forces: Divisions. Washington: Government Printing Office, 1931. Reprint. Washington: Government Printing Office, 1988.
- History of the Third Division, United States Army in the World War for the Period 1 December 1917 to 1 January 1919. Cologne, Germany: M. DuSchaubery, 1919.
- Holmes, Howard W. "100 Miles to Nijmegen." Army Digest 22 (January 1967):29–30.
- Howe, George F. Northwest Africa: Seizing the Initiative in the West. United States Army in World War II. Washington: Government Printing Office, 1957, 1991.
- Jacobs, Bruce. Soldiers: The Fighting Divisions of the Regular Army. New York: W. W. Norton and Co., 1958.
- Kahn, E. J., Jr., and McLemore, H. Fighting Divisions. Washington: Infantry Journal Press, 1945. Reprint. Washington: Zenger Publishing Co., 1980.
- Kittler, Glenn D. "From Chateau-Thierry to Anzio to Wonson; The Fighting Third." SAGA: True Adventures for Men 8 (September 1954):10-13ff.
- Lacey, Jim. The Third Infantry Division's Twenty-One Day Assault on Baghdad. US Naval Institute Press: 2007.
- Lamb, David S. Till We Meet Again. Cleveland: Stevens Publishing Co., 1944.
- Le Mon, Warren. "The Marne Division." Army Information Digest 20 (October 1965):37–43.
- MacDonald, Charles B. The Last Offensive. United States Army in World War II. Washington: Government Printing Office, 1973, 1990.
- Military Intelligence Division, War Department. From the Volturno to the Winter Line (6 October-15 November 1943). American Forces in Action. Washington: Government Printing Office, 1945, 1990.
- Military Intelligence Division, War Department. Salerno: American Operations from the Beaches to the Volturno (9 September-6 October 1943). Washington: Government Printing Office, 1944, 1990.
- Mohr, G. William. Third Infantry Division, WWII, The Victory Path Thru France and Germany. Kokomo, Ind. O & M, 1985.
- Murphy, Audie. To Hell and Back. New York: Henry Holt and Co., 1949.
- "Pass in Review." Army Information Digest 20 (October 1965):32–36.
- Pass in Review, The Pictorial History of the Third Division, United States Army, Operations, Training, Maneuvers, Camp Ord, California, 1940. Baton Rouge: Army and Navy Publishing Co., 1940.
- Personnel Service Division, Adjutant General Section. 3d Infantry Division. Administrative Service Branch, Adjutant General Section, 1971.
- Rescigno, Richard J., and Wiltamuth, Richard L. "Alert!--That's the Watchword of the Marne Division Today." Army Digest 25 (August 1970):38–43.
- Road to Rome. n.p., 1945.
- Rosson, William B. "Operational Highlights of the 3d Infantry Division." Military Review 25 (December 1945):42–45.
- Rosson, William B. "3d Infantry Division Crosses the Meurthe." Military Review 26 (February 1947):24–35.
- Scott, Hugh A. The Blue and White Devils. A Personal Memoir and History of the 3rd Infantry Division in World War II. Nashville, Tenn., Battery Press, 1984.
- Stitt, Edgar A. 100 Days, 100-Hours: "Phantom" Brigade in the Gulf War. Hong Kong: Concord Publications, 1991.
- Small, Collie. "The Third: Tops in Honors." Saturday Evening Post 218 (11 August 1945):28-29ff.
- Stanton, Shelby, World War II Order of Battle: An Encyclopedic Reference to U.S. Army Ground Forces from Battalion through Division, 1939-1946 (Revised Edition, 2006), Stackpole Books ISBN 0-8117-0157-3
- Taggart, Donald G., ed. History of the Third Infantry Division in World War II. Washington: Infantry Journal Press, 1947. Reprint. Nashville, Tenn., Battery Press, 1987.
- Taylor, Horace G.; Milam, Michael M.; and Ericksen, Scott R. "3d Infantry Division." Infantry 68 (January–February 1978):18–22.
- The Third Division at Chateau Thierry. U.S. Army Chemical Corps Historical Studies, Gas Warfare in World War I, Study No. 14. Washington: U.S. Army Chemical Corps Historical Office, 1959.
- Third Division Citations. Andernach on the Rhine, Germany: Carl Reinartz, 1919.
- "3rd Infantry Division Gyroscoping: Enlistments Open." Recruiting Journal 10 (May 1957):8–9.
- 3rd Infantry Division in Korea. Society of the Third Infantry Division, 1987.
- 3rd Infantry Division, Information Office. 3d Infantry Division, 1917-Forty Year Odyssey-1958. Würzburg, Germany: Konrad Triltsch, 1958.
- "Valor: 3d Division in Sicily." Infantry Journal 54 (March 1944):16–18; (June 1944): 44.
- Westover, John G. Combat Support in Korea. Washington: Combat Forces Press, 1955. Reprint. Washington: Government Printing Office, 1990.
