= List of commanders of 3rd Infantry Division (United States) =

Shoulder sleeve insignia of the US 3rd Infantry Division.

This is a list of commanders of the 3rd Infantry Division of the United States Army.

== Past commanders ==
1. MG Joseph T. Dickman (28 November 1917)
2. BG James A. Irons (11 February 1918)
3. MG Joseph T. Dickman (13 February 1918)
4. BG James A. Irons (27 February 1918)
5. BG Charles Crawford (8 March 1918)
6. BG James A. Irons (10 March 1918)
7. BG Charles Crawford (19 March 1918)
8. MG Joseph T. Dickman (12 April 1918)
9. BG Fred W. Sladen (18 August 1918)
10. MG Beaumont B. Buck (27 August 1918)
11. BG Preston Brown (18 October 1918)
12. MG Robert Lee Howze (19 November 1918)
13. BG William Mackey Cruikshank (Aug 1919)
14. BG Ora Elmer Hunt (Aug 1919–Oct 1919)
15. MG William M. Wright (Oct 1919–Jan 1920)
16. BG Edward M. Lewis (Jan 1920–Aug 1921)
17. MG Charles H. Muir (Aug 1921–Nov 1922)
18. BG Ulysses G. McAlexander (Nov 1922–Nov 1923)
19. MG Edwin B. Babbitt (Nov 1923–May 1924)
20. BG Joseph E. Kuhn (May 1924–Dec 1924)
21. MG William Johnston Jr. (Dec 1924–Oct 1925)
22. MG Robert Alexander (Oct 1925–Aug 1927)
23. MG Joseph D. Leitch (Sep 1927–Mar 1928)
24. BG Michael J. Lenihan (Mar 1928–Mar 1929)
25. BG Joseph C. Castner (Apr 1929–Nov 1932)
26. BG Halstead Dorey (1932–1933)
27. BG Henry W. Butner (1933–Feb 1934)
28. BG Otho B. Rosenbaum (Feb 1934–Aug 1935)
29. MG Casper H. Conrad Jr. (Aug 1935–Aug 1936)
30. MG David L. Stone (Sep 1936–Mar 1937)
31. BG Alfred T. Smith (Jul 1937–Jan 1938)
32. MG Walter C. Sweeney Sr. (1939–1940)
33. MG Charles F. Thompson (July 1940 – August 1941)
34. BG Charles P. Hall (August 1941 – September 1941)
35. MG John P. Lucas (September 1941 – March 1942)
36. MG Jonathan W. Anderson (March 1942 – March 1943)
37. MG Lucian K. Truscott Jr. (March 1943 – February 1944)
38. MG John W. O'Daniel (February 1944 – July 1945)
39. MG William R. Schmidt (August 1945 – August 1946)
40. MG Percy W. Clarkson (December 1947-August 1950)
41. MG Robert H. Soule (August 1950 – October 1951)
42. MG Thomas J. Cross (October 1951 – May 1952)
43. MG Robert L. Dulaney (May 1952 – October 1952)
44. MG George W. Smythe (October 1952 – May 1953)
45. MG Eugene W. Ridings (May 1953 – October 1953)
46. MG Charles D. W. Canham (November 1953 – November 1954)
47. MG Haydon L. Boatner (December 1954 – October 1955)
48. MG George E. Lynch (October 1955 – February 1957)
49. BG Frederick R. Zierath (March 1957 – March 1957)
50. MG Roy E. Lindquist (March 1957 – August 1958)
51. MG John S. Upham Jr. (August 1958 – April 1960)
52. MG Albert Watson II (April 1960 – April 1961)
53. MG William W. Dick Jr. (April 1961 – April 1962)
54. BG Morris O. Edwards (April 1962 – June 1962)
55. MG Frank T. Mildren (June 1962 – March 1964)
56. MG Albert O. Connor (March 1964 – February 1966)
57. MG Robert H. Schellman (April 1966 – August 1967)
58. BG Lawrence V. Greene (August 1967 – October 1967)
59. MG George P. Seneff Jr. (October 1967 – March 1969)
60. MG George M. Seignious (March 1969 – February 1970)
61. MG Robert C. Taber (February 1970 – April 1971)
62. MG Marshall B. Garth (April 1971 – September 1972)
63. MG Sam S. Walker (September 1972 – June 1974)
64. MG Edward C. Meyer (June 1974 – August 1975)
65. MG Pat W. Crizer (August 1975 – October 1977)
66. MG R. Dean Tice (October 1977 – October 1979)
67. MG Sam Wetzel (October 1979 – 1981)
68. MG Fred K. Mahaffey (1981–1983)
69. MG Howard G. Crowell, Jr. (1983–1985)
70. MG George R. Stotser (1985–1987)
71. MG Nicholas S. H. Krawciw (1987–1989)
72. MG Wilson A. Shoffner (1989–1991)
73. BG Richard F. Keller (1991–1993)
74. MG Leonard D. Holder Jr. (1993–1995)
75. MG Montgomery Meigs (July 1995 – February 1996)
76. MG Joseph E. DeFrancisco (June 1996 – August 1996)
77. MG John W. Hendrix (August 1996 – October 1997)
78. MG James C. Riley (October 1997 – December 1999)
79. MG Walter L. Sharp (December 1999 – December 2001)
80. MG Buford Blount (December 2001 - September 2003)
81. MG William G. Webster (September 2003 - June 2006)
82. MG Rick Lynch (June 2006 - July 2008)
83. MG Tony Cucolo (July 2008 - April 2011)
84. MG Robert B. Abrams (April 2011 - August 2013)
85. MG John M. Murray (August 2013 - August 2015)
86. MG James E. Rainey (August 2015 - May 2017)
87. MG Leopoldo A. Quintas (May 2017 - June 2019)
88. MG Antonio Aguto (June 2019-June 2021)
89. MG Charles Costanza (June 2021 – June 2023)
90. MG Christopher Norrie (June 2023 – July 2025)
91. BG John Lubas (July 2025-present)
