= 10th Engineer Battalion (United States) =

- 10th Engineer Battalion coat of arms
- Active: 1866–2004; 2015—Present
- Country: United States
- Branch: US Army Corps of Engineers
- Type: Brigade Engineer Battalion (BEB)
- Garrison/HQ: Fort Stewart, GA
- Nickname: We Bridged the Sky
- Mottos: "Laboramus Sustinere" (Latin: We Work to Assist)

The 10th Engineer Battalion is a unit of the United States Army that deploys to designated contingency areas and conducts combat and/or stability operations in support of a brigade combat team. It is a divisional mechanized combat engineer unit, composed of four line companies and a headquarters company. As of January 17 2015, the battalion exists as the 10th Brigade Engineer Battalion (10th BEB) at Fort Stewart, GA under the 1st Armored Brigade Combat Team, 3rd Infantry Division.

== Lineage ==
The unit was formed on December 31 1861 in the Regular Army at Washington, D.C., from new and existing companies of engineers as a provisional engineer battalion (constituted July 28 1866 as the Battalion of Engineers)

- Expanded 14 March – 7 June 1901 to form the 1st and 2nd Battalions of Engineers (2nd Battalion of Engineers—hereafter separate lineage)
- 1st Battalion of Engineers expanded, reorganized, and redesignated 1 July 1916 as the 1st Regiment of Engineers
- 1st Regiment of Engineers expanded 15 May 1917 to form the 1st, 6th, and the 7th Regiments of Engineers (1st and 7th Regiments—hereafter separate lineages)
- 6th Regiment of Engineers redesignated 29 August 1917 as the 6th Engineers
- Assigned 1 October 1917 to the 3rd Division
- Regiment broken up 12 October 1939 and its elements reorganized and redesignated as follows:
  - 2nd Battalion as the 10th Engineer Battalion, an element of the 3rd Division (later redesignated as the 3rd Infantry Division);
  - Headquarters and Headquarters and Service Company disbanded; and
  - 1st Battalion as the 6th Engineer Battalion—hereafter separate lineage
- 10th Engineer Battalion redesignated 1 August 1942 as the 10th Engineer Combat Battalion
- Redesignated 1 March 1954 as the 10th Engineer Battalion
- Assigned 15 February 1996 to the 3rd Infantry Division
- Inactivated 15 March 2004 at Fort Stewart, Georgia, and relieved from assignment to the 3rd Infantry Division
- Assigned 17 January 2015 to the 1st Brigade Combat Team, 3rd Infantry Division, and activated at Fort Stewart, Georgia

== Honors ==
=== Campaign participation credit ===
- Civil War
  - Peninsula
  - Antietam
  - Fredericksburg
  - Wilderness
  - Spotsylvania
  - Cold Harbor
  - Petersburg
  - Appomattox
  - Virginia 1863
- World War I
  - Somme Defensive
  - Champagne-Marne
  - Aisne-Marne
  - St. Mihiel
  - Meuse-Argonne
  - Champagne 1918
- World War II
  - Algeria-French Morocco
  - Tunisia
  - Sicily (with arrowhead)
  - Naples-Foggia
  - Anzio (with arrowhead)
  - Rome-Arno
  - Southern France (with arrowhead)
  - Rhineland
  - Ardennes-Alsace
  - Central Europe
- Korean War
  - CCF Intervention
  - First UN Counteroffensive
  - CCF Spring Offensive
  - UN Summer-Fall Offensive
  - Second Korean Winter
  - Korea, Summer-Fall 1952
  - Third Korean Winter
  - Korea, Summer 1953
  - Desert Shield/Desert Storm 1991
- War on Terrorism
  - Campaigns to be determined

=== Decorations ===
- Presidential Unit Citation (Army)
  - Streamer embroidered COLMAR
  - Streamer embroidered IRAQ 2003
- Meritorious Unit Commendation (Army)
  - Streamer embroidered KOREA 1950–1951
- French Croix de Guerre with Palm (World War I)
  - Streamer embroidered CHAMPAGNE-MARNE, AISNE-MARNE
- French Croix de Guerre with Palm (World War II)
  - Streamer embroidered COLMAR
- French Croix de Guerre (World War II)
  - Fourragere
- Republic of Korea Presidential Unit Citation
  - Streamer embroidered UIJONGBU CORRIDOR
  - Streamer embroidered IRON TRIANGLE
- Chryssoun Aristion Andrias (Bravery Gold Medal of Greece)
  - Streamer embroidered KOREA

== Fallen Soldiers (known) ==
WORLD WAR II

CPT Stanley E. Larson

Sgt. Albert J. Warner

Sgt. Glenn W. Scott

Pfc. Dorvall J. Walter

Pfc. Donald J. Towslee

2Lt. William A. Thomas

T/5. Jack H. Taylor

Pfc. Rex F. Stokes

Cpl. Fred C. Standish

Sgt. Israel E. Selph

Pvt. Gustave Ruiz

Pvt. Ralph W. Quinnan

Pfc. Willy Pederssen

Pvt. Walter F. Massey

Pfc. Grant H. Martin

1Lt. Joseph N. Marcantonio

Pfc. Lawrence E. Le Duc

Pvt. George B. King

Pvt. Cullie B. Johnson

Pvt. Thomas J. Houlihan

Pvt. John M. Hodge

Sgt. James R. Graybeal

1Lt. Vernon H. Evans

Pvt. Robert A. Engle

Pfc. Robert H. Dobbins

Pfc. Edward J. De Stefano

Pvt. Leonard F. Cwynar

Pvt. Cyril J. Chevalier

Pvt. Richard Carlson

Sgt. Wyatt D. Bassett

Pvt. Ted Barabas

Sgt. Donald H. Tosh

Pfc. Rafael Ordonez

T/5. Albert J. Klein

Sgt. Kenneth A. Stoner

1Lt. Leroy F. Sasse

Cpl. Grover G. Shepherd

T/5. Leon J. Weems

T/5. Thomas J. Redmond

S/Sgt. James M Renfro

2Lt. Earl H. Ostmeyer

Pfc. Harold C. Krueger

2Lt. Leo W. French Jr. (C Co) 1944 (KIA) Anzio

KOREA

PV2 John A. Aimer (D Co), 29 Nov 1950 (KIA)

SFC Ellis L. Aldridge (HSC), 4 Oct 1951 (KIA)

PFC Herbert Armbruster (D Co), 29 Nov 1950 (KIA)

PFC Claude E. Bachtell (C Co), 23 Mar 1951 (DOW)

PFC Walter J. Ball (B Co), 21 Nov 1950 (KIA)

PV2 Bernard A. Beemon, 28 Nov 1950 (KIA)

CPL Arthur L. Belt, 28 Nov 1950 (KIA)

MSG Leonard J. Best (D Co), 29 Nov 1950 (MIA)

SGT Donald Bombardier (D Co), 28 Nov 1950 (KIA)

CPL Charles E. Burba (D Co), 28 Nov 1950 (KIA)

1LT Robert W. Carney (C Co), 25 Feb 1951 (KIA)

PV2 Sammie L. Clifton (D Co), 26 Mar 1951 (DOW)

PFC Josue, Cortes-Boisjoli (C Co), 5 Jun 1951 (KIA)

CPL Thomas R. Davison (D Co), 31 Dec 1951 (DD)

1LT Max L. DeRossett (HSC), 4 Oct 1951 (KIA)

PV2 Charles Drengberg, 29 Nov 1950 (DOW)

CPL James D. Eroddy, 12 Sep 1952 (KIA)

PFC Robert W. Faris (A Co), 29 Nov 1950 (KIA)

SGT Noe Franco, 10 May 1953 (KIA)

PFC John S. Grover (D Co), 24 Mar 1951 (DOW)

PV2 Salvador M. Guzman, 13 Jun 1953 (KIA)

PFC James E. Hartley Jr. (D Co), 28 Nov 1950 (KIA)

CPL Sonnie L. Holmes (HSC), 4 Nov 1951 (KIA)

PV2 Daniel B. Jewell, 28 Nov 1950 (KIA)

PFC Daniel R. Lambert (HSC), 4 Oct 1951 (KIA)

SGT Homer M. McDaniel (D Co), 28 Nov 1950 (MIA)

CPL Harry T. McGonigle (B Co), 21 Nov 1950 (KIA)

CPL Larry O. Merrill (D Co), 28 Nov 1950 (DD)

CPL Norman B. Miller Jr., 29 Nov 1950 (KIA)

CPL Sylvian A. Moyers, 24 Apr 1951 (DOW)

SFC Henry C. Nunnery (D Co), 28 Nov 1950 (KIA)

PV2 Raymond R. O'Connor, 13 Jun 1953 (KIA)

CPL Thomas F. Palmer (D Co), 29 Nov 1950 (KIA)

PV2 Jerry B. Powers (D Co), 28 Nov 1950 (KIA)

CPL James A. Prater (C Co), 16 Mar 1951 (KIA)

PV2 Roy Ray Jr., 27 Apr 1953 (KIA)

SFC Oliver P. Riels (A Co), 2 Dec 1950 (DD)

PFC Donnie F. Roby (D Co), 28 Nov 1950 (KIA)

PV2 Robert F. Ruder, 13 Jun 1953 (KIA)

CPL William M. Scalf (HSC), 4 Nov 1951 (KIA)

1LT Carl J. Schiltz (C Co), 24 Nov 1950 (KIA)

CPL Glenn A. Schreiner (A Co), 1 Dec 1951 (KIA)

PV2 Ben T. Smith Jr. (D Co), 29 Nov 1950 (KIA)

CPL Charles L. Somers (B Co), 21 Nov 1950 (DD)

PFC Earnest A. Taylor (B Co), 21 Nov 1950 (MIA)

SFC Raymond R. Thornton (D Co), 28 Nov 1950 (DD)

MSG James M. Traylor, 18 Dec 1950 (MIA)

PV2 Charles C. Van Elsberg (B Co), 21 Nov 1950 (KIA)

CPL Nick Vezakis Jr. (B Co), 16 Oct 1951 (KIA)

2LT Thomas D. Wood, 15 Jun 1953 (KIA)

PV2 Steve A. Zagurskie (D Co), 23 Apr 1951 (KIA)

PFC Salvatore J. Zucca, 25 Jul 1953 (DOW)

== Commanders ==
LTC Robert F. Petherick, 1944

LTC John P. Kuspa, 1985–1987

LTC Jerry Samples, 1987–1991

LTC Geoffrey Van Epps, 2015

LTC Jason M. Whitten, 2015–2017

LTC Scott F. Swilley, 2017–2019

LTC Sean A. Wittmeier, 2019–2021

LTC Alexander D. Samms, 2021–2023

LTC Brian C. Walker, 2023-2025

LTC Joseph M. Baumann 2025-present

== See also ==
- Military engineering of the United States
- Combat engineer
- Military engineering
