= James Phillip Connor =

- Born: January 12, 1919; Wilmington, Delaware
- Died: July 27, 1994 (aged 75)
- Burial place: Delaware Veterans Memorial Cemetery, Bear, Delaware
- Military career
- Allegiance: United States of America
- Branch: United States Army
- Service years: 1941 - 1945
- Rank: Sergeant
- Units: 7th Infantry Regiment, 3rd Infantry Division
- Conflicts: World War II
- Awards: Medal of Honor

James Phillip Connor (January 12, 1919 – July 27, 1994) was a sergeant in the United States Army who received the Medal of Honor after leading a platoon of 36 men attached to the 7th Infantry Regiment, 3rd Infantry Division against German positions, defended by snipers and machine gun nests, at Cape Cavalaire, France on August 15, 1944. Seriously wounded in the course of the assault, the third suffered while on active duty, he continued to fight alongside his men until his injuries forced him to stand down (although he continued to direct the assault).

Although losing one-third of his platoon, Connor's men were successfully able to outflank the enemy killing seven German soldiers and capturing forty more as well as taking a considerable amount of supplies including three machine guns.

Connor joined the Army from his birth city of Wilmington, Delaware in January 1941. He was discharged in 1945.

== Medal of Honor citation ==
Rank and organization: Sergeant, U.S. Army, 7th Infantry, 3rd Infantry Division. Place and date: Cape Cavalaire, southern France, 15 August 1944. Entered service at: Wilmington, Del. Born: Wilmington, Del. G.O. No.: 18, 15 March 1945.

Citation:

For conspicuous gallantry and intrepidity at risk of life above and beyond the call of duty. On 15 August 1944, Sgt. Connor, through sheer grit and determination, led his platoon in clearing an enemy vastly superior in numbers and firepower from strongly entrenched positions on Cape Cavalaire, removing a grave enemy threat to his division during the amphibious landing in southern France, and thereby insured safe and uninterrupted landings for the huge volume of men and materiel which followed. His battle patrol landed on "Red Beach" with the mission of destroying the strongly fortified enemy positions on Cape Cavalaire with utmost speed. From the peninsula the enemy had commanding observation and seriously menaced the vast landing operations taking place. Though knocked down and seriously wounded in the neck by a hanging mine which killed his platoon lieutenant, Sgt. Connor refused medical aid and with his driving spirit practically carried the platoon across several thousand yards of mine-saturated beach through intense fire from mortars, 20-mm. flak guns, machineguns, and snipers. En route to the Cape he personally shot and killed 2 snipers. The platoon sergeant was killed and Sgt. Connor became platoon leader. Receiving a second wound, which lacerated his shoulder and back, he again refused evacuation, expressing determination to carry on until physically unable to continue. He reassured and prodded the hesitating men of his decimated platoon forward through almost impregnable mortar concentrations. Again emphasizing the prevalent urgency of their mission, he impelled his men toward a group of buildings honeycombed with enemy snipers and machineguns. Here he received his third grave wound, this time in the leg, felling him in his tracks. Still resolved to carry on, he relinquished command only after his attempts proved that it was physically impossible to stand. Nevertheless, from his prone position, he gave the orders and directed his men in assaulting the enemy. Infused with Sgt. Connor's dogged determination, the platoon, though reduced to less than one-third of its original 36 men, outflanked and rushed the enemy with such furiousness that they killed 7, captured 40, seized 3 machineguns and considerable other materiel, and took all their assigned objectives, successfully completing their mission. By his repeated examples of tenaciousness and indomitable spirit Sgt Connor transmitted his heroism to his men until they became a fighting team which could not be stopped.`

== See also ==
- List of Medal of Honor recipients
- List of Medal of Honor recipients for World War II
