= Heavy Metal: A Tank Company's Battle to Baghdad =

2005 book by Jason Conroy

- Author: Jason Conroy, Ron Martz
- Language: English
- Publisher: Potomac Books
- Publication date: 2005
- Publication place: United States

Heavy Metal: A Tank Company's Battle to Baghdad is a book by U.S. Army Captains Jason Conroy and Ron Martz, published in 2005 by Potomac Books. The book provides a personal account of the fighting that took place during the 2003 invasion of Iraq, following Charlie Company from its home base at Fort Stewart, Georgia, to training in the deserts of California and Kuwait, and through the battles on the road to Baghdad. The book describes the challenges that Conroy and his soldiers faced, such as supply shortages, intelligence failures, and difficult weather conditions. It also details the tactics used by Iraqi militias and Fedayeen Saddam, including suicide attacks, to try to stop the tanks.

The book recounts how Charlie Company engaged in a battle with Soviet-made T-72 tanks at point-blank range near Baghdad, a tactic that was not part of Army doctrine and for which the soldiers were not trained.

Conroy and Martz include information about the Iraqi National Museum in Baghdad, including how museum employees and others hid most of the artifacts before the fighting began and how the number of stolen items was exaggerated by a member of the museum staff in interviews with international media.

== Authors ==
Captain Jason Conroy, a 14-year veteran of the U.S. Army, was the Charlie Company Commander, 1st Battalion, 64th Armor Regiment.

Ron Martz writes on defense issues for the Atlanta Journal-Constitution. He was named writer of the year by the Atlanta Press Club and Cox Newspapers and finished second to the staff of Time Magazine in the National Headliner Awards for his coverage of the war in Iraq. He is the co-author of three previous books on military history.

== Editions ==
- ISBN 1-57488-856-0
