= Commander's Emergency Response Program =

Financial program during the Iraq and Afghanistan Wars

Commander's Emergency Response Program (CERP) was money for military commanders to use for conducting rebuilding and reconstruction during the Iraq and Afghanistan Wars.

== The program ==
It was initially money seized during the invasion of Iraq, but later was also U.S. Federally appropriated funds. The military must use the money for the benefit of the Iraqi or Afghan people, such as public roads, schools and medical clinics or humanitarian aid. The funds for CERP came from the Department of Defense. The use of funds in the field can be authorized by military commanders at the brigade level. The rules governing the use of such funds will be based on any Congressional restrictions in the legislation, and will be tailored to the needs of the particular operation. For the United States military, the use of money through CERP was considered an effective counterinsurgency weapon.

By January 2011, the United States Military spent $2 billion on 16,000 projects in Afghanistan over 6 years using CERP to assist the people. The projects ranged in size from renovating schools, building wells to much larger public works and infrastructure reconstruction.
