= Dogs For Defense =

WWII US military program requesting dogs

Dogs for Defense was a World War II US military program in which the military asked pet owners to donate their pet dogs to the war effort. The dogs were trained and used for guard and patrol duties. To encourage donations, the dogs were deprogrammed and returned to their families after the war.

== History ==
Prior to World War II, the US military did not have a formal canine corps, and owned fewer than a hundred dogs (mostly sled dogs in Alaska). After Pearl Harbor, a woman named Alene Erlanger pushed for the US military to begin using dogs.

The Dogs for Defense program was the idea of Harry I. Caesar, a New York businessman and president of the American Kennel Club. He noted that dogs had senses of smell, hearing, and vision that were superior to humans and that canines had long been used by armies. He outlined a program that called for at least 125,000 of the nation's pet dogs to be trained and deployed for both civilian defense and military guard duty. An intake center was established in Newton, Massachusetts and a training center was set up on the Karlstein polo grounds (Note: Near the current day Rashi School.) in Dedham, Massachusetts.

By 1942, there were regional centers set up for the intake and training of dogs. Originally, dogs were required to be well-behaved purebreds between one and five years old. They also had to weigh least 50 pounds (23 kg) and stand 18 inches (46 cm) tall. In time, mixed breeds were accepted as the need grew, although Chow Chows were found to be unreliable. Many dogs were sent back home for being too friendly, but those who passed the training program were assigned to military installations both in the United States and in combat zones abroad.
