= R. Dean Tice =

American army officer (1927–2025)

Raphael Dean Tice
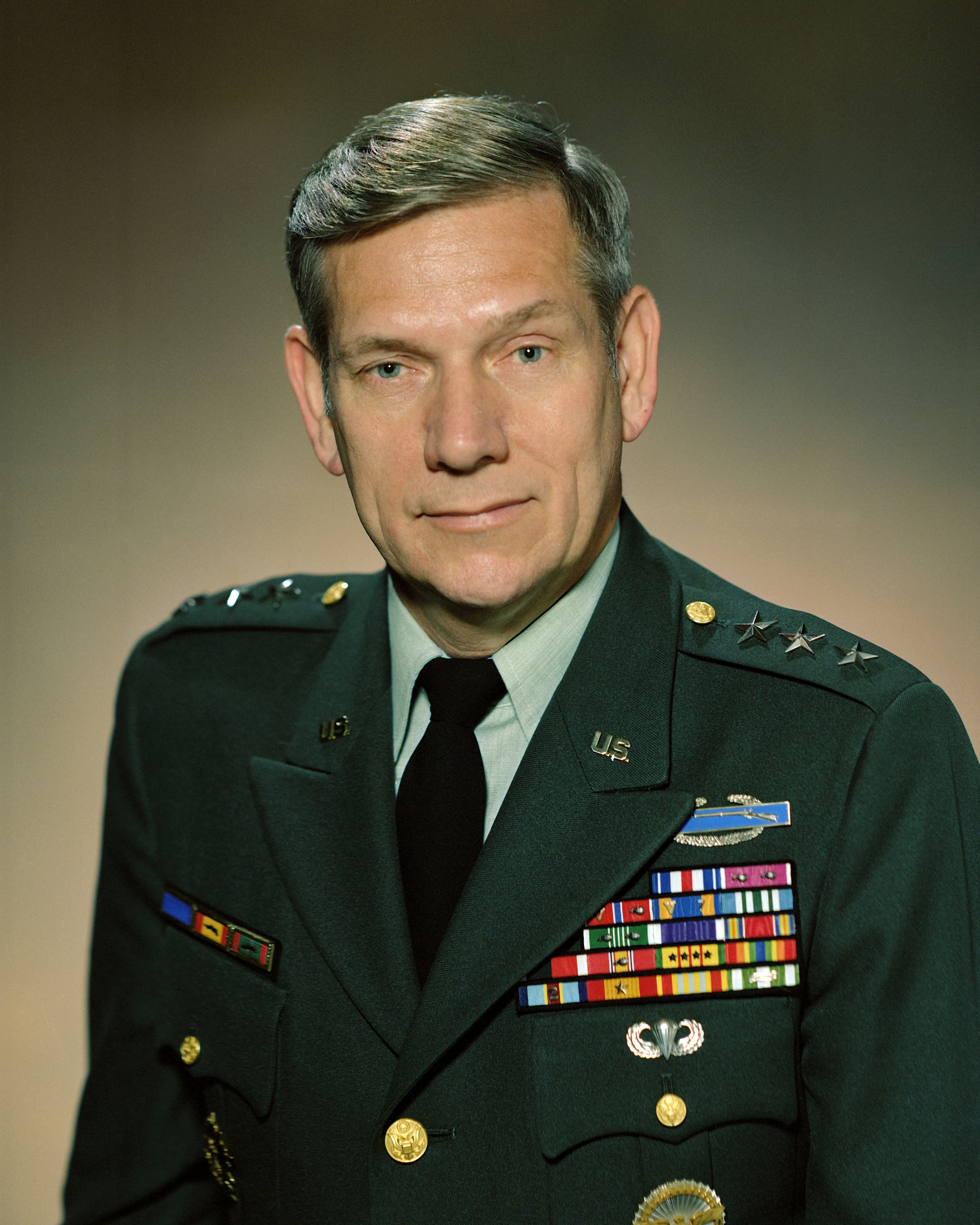
- Born: December 4, 1927; Topeka, Kansas, U.S.
- Died: August 6, 2025 (aged 97)
- Military career
- Allegiance: United States
- Branch: United States Army
- Service years: 1946–1986
- Rank: Lieutenant General
- Units: 1st, 3rd, 4th and 25th Divisions
- Commands: Deputy Cmdr 3rd Bde, 4th Div; BN Cmdr 2/12th Inf, 25th Div; Bde Cmdr, 1st Bde, 1st Div; Div Cmdr, 3rd Inf Div
- Conflicts: Vietnam War
- Awards: Silver Star, Legion of Merit, Bronze Star/V, Army Commendation Medal

Raphael Dean Tice (December 4, 1927 – August 6, 2025) was a lieutenant general in the United States Army. He was the Director of the Department of Defense Task Force on Drug Enforcement.

== Biography ==
Dean Tice was the son of a farmer from Topeka, Kansas. He entered the U.S. Army as an enlisted man in December, 1945, but was allowed to finish school before actually starting his military career. Shortly after entering the Army, he was put in for OCS school and at the age of 19 became the youngest officer in the Army and 40 years later retired from the Army after a long and distinguished career with the rank of Lieutenant General (3 stars). He commanded at every level from company through division, and served more than 14 years overseas. During early commissioned service, he served in various command and staff positions at the battalion level. In Vietnam (1967–68), he served as Deputy Brigade Commander of the 3rd Brigade, 4th Infantry Division, and later commanded the 2nd Battalion, 12th Infantry of the 25th Infantry Division. Upon completion of his Vietnam tour, he directed the Military Manpower Procurement Program in the Office of the Assistant Secretary of Defense for Manpower and Reserve Affairs.

In 1970, Tice joined the 1st Infantry Division, where he commanded the 1st Brigade and later served as the Chief of Staff. He was promoted to Brigadier General in 1972, and assigned to the Pentagon in the Office of the Deputy Chief of Staff for Personnel. General Tice assumed command of the Berlin Brigade in 1974 and remained in that capacity until 1976, when after being Promoted to Major General, he became the Deputy Chief of Staff, Personnel, for the U.S. Army, Europe, and Seventh Army Heidelberg, Germany. In 1977, he assumed command of the 3rd Infantry Division, Wuerzburg, Germany.

From 1976 to 1983, Tice served as Deputy Assistant Secretary of Defense for personnel policy and force management, a position in which he directed policy for all Morale, Welfare and Recreation (MWR) programs. In that role, he initiated and chaired the Defense Department's MWR Coordinating Committee. Tice retired, initially in 1983, only to be recalled to active duty three months later by President Reagan and Defense Secretary Weinberger to become Director of the Department of Defense Task Force on Drug Enforcement.

During his military career, Tice earned a BS in military science and engineering, and MBA from George Washington University. In his senior roles in personnel in the Army he was responsible for MWR programs for hundreds of thousands of troops, and in his active leadership role on the battle field he had learned how important recreation opportunities were to the morale of his troops.

These experiences prepared him well for his second distinguished career which commenced in July 1986 when General Tice left government service to become the Executive Director of the National Recreation and Park Association (NRPA). At the time of his appointment he was serving on the NRPA Board of Trustees as the armed services representative. Thus he was aware when he assumed the Executive Director position that NRPA was at a critical stage in its evolution. The organization had a total net worth of $430,000, having spent much of its historic capital endowment to cover operating expenses. Membership had declined to 14,000 and the annual Congress attendance was stagnant. There was much dissention throughout the organization about the perceived lack of leadership at all levels and the overall lack of direction. Morale was low.

By the time Tice retired from NRPA in 2001, he had transformed the organization. NRPA's net worth increased from $430,000 to $9 million; membership had increased to 23,500; the organization had over $5 million in reserves and an operating budget of $10.5 million; and annual advertising revenues from Parks & Recreation magazine had grown from $90,000 in FY 1986 to $1.3 million in FY 2001.

Tice died on August 6, 2025, at the age of 97.
