= Epinal American Cemetery and Memorial =

ABMC cemetery in Lorraine, France

Coordinates: 48°08′38″N 06°29′48″E

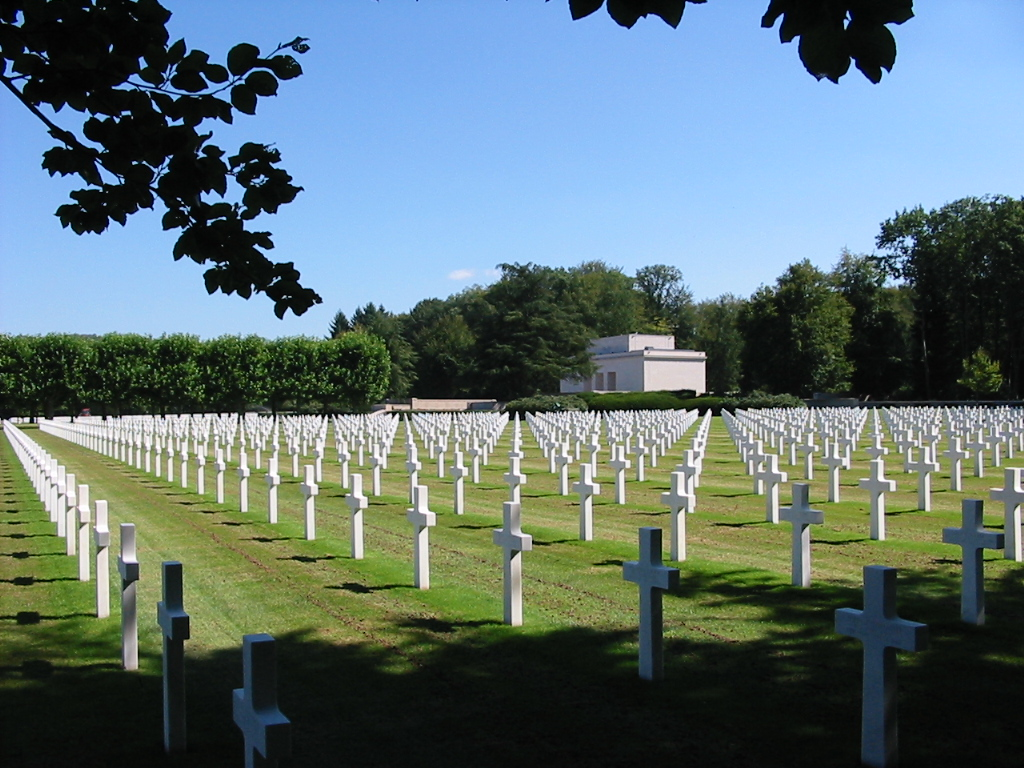
- Epinal American Cemetery and Memorial.
- Interactive map of Epinal American Cemetery and Memorial

Details
- Established: 1944
- Location: Dinozé
- Country: France
- Type: American military, World War II
- Size: 48.6 acres (19.7 ha)
- No. of graves: 5,255
- Website: American Battle Monuments Commission – Epinal American Cemetery and Memorial

Epinal American Cemetery and Memorial is a United States military cemetery in Dinozé, France. The 48.6 acres (19.7 ha) site rests on a plateau 100 feet (30 m) above the Moselle River in the foothills of the Vosges Mountains. It contains the graves of 5,255 of the United States' military dead, most of whom lost their lives in the Battle of Alsace, Battle of the Vosges and other northeast campaigns to the Rhine and beyond into Germany during World War II.

== History ==
The cemetery was established in October 1944 by the 46th Quartermaster Company (Graves Registration Service) of the U.S. Seventh Army as it drove northward from southern France through the Rhône Valley into Germany. The cemetery became the repository for the fatalities in the bitter fighting through the Heasbourg Gap during the winter of 1944–45.

On May 12, 1958, thirteen caskets draped with American flags were placed side by side at the memorial. Each casket contained the remains of one World War II Unknown American, one from each of the thirteen permanent American military cemeteries in the European Theater of Operations. In a solemn ceremony, General Edward J. O'Neill, Commanding General of the U.S. Army Communication Zone, Europe, selected the Unknown to represent the European Theater. It was flown to Naples, Italy and placed with Unknowns from the Atlantic and Pacific Theaters of Operations aboard the USS Blandy for transportation to Washington, D.C. for final selection of the Unknown from World War II. On Memorial Day, 1958, the remains were buried alongside the Unknown from World War I at the Tomb of the Unknown Soldier at Arlington National Cemetery.

== Memorial ==
The memorial, a rectangular structure with two large bas-relief panels, consists of a chapel, portico, and map room with a mosaic operations map constructed under the direction of the American artist Eugene Savage. On the walls of the Court of Honor, which surround the memorial, are inscribed the names of 424 of the missing. Rosettes mark the names of those since recovered and identified. Stretching northward is a wide, tree-lined mall that separates the two large burial plots. At the northern end of the mall, the circular flagpole plaza forms an overlook affording a view of a wide sweep of the Moselle Valley.

== Notable burials ==
- Medal of Honor recipients
  - Victor L. Kandle (1921–1944 †), for action against German forces in October 1944.
  - Gus J. Kefurt (1917–1944 †), for action against German forces in December 1944.
  - John D. Kelly (1923–1944 †), for action against German forces in June 1944
  - Ellis R. Weicht (1916–1944 †), for action against German forces in December 1944
- Jimmy Butler (1921–1945 †), American actor
- Brigadier general Edmund Wilson Searby (1896–1944 †), Division Artillery Commander of the 80th Infantry Division

== Accessibility ==
Epinal American Cemetery is located approximately 4 miles (7 km) southeast of Épinal (Vosges), France, on road D-157, in the village of Dinozé-Le Quéquement. It can be reached by automobile from Paris (231 miles) in about 5 hours via toll autoroute A-4, eastward to the Nancy exit, then highway N-57 or about 4 hours via toll autoroute A-5 to Bulgnéville exit. Avoid the city of Epinal and exit only at Arches-Dinozé. Rail service is available from the Gare de l'Est, Paris via Nancy, where it may be necessary to change trains. The journey by train requires about 3 hours by the French high-speed train (TGV). Hotel accommodations and taxi service can be found in Epinal and vicinity.

The cemetery is open daily to the public from 9 a.m. to 5 p.m. except December 25 and January 1. It is open on host country holidays. When the cemetery is open to the public, a staff member is on duty in the Visitor Building to answer questions and escort relatives to grave and memorial sites.
