= 15th Infantry Regiment (United States) =

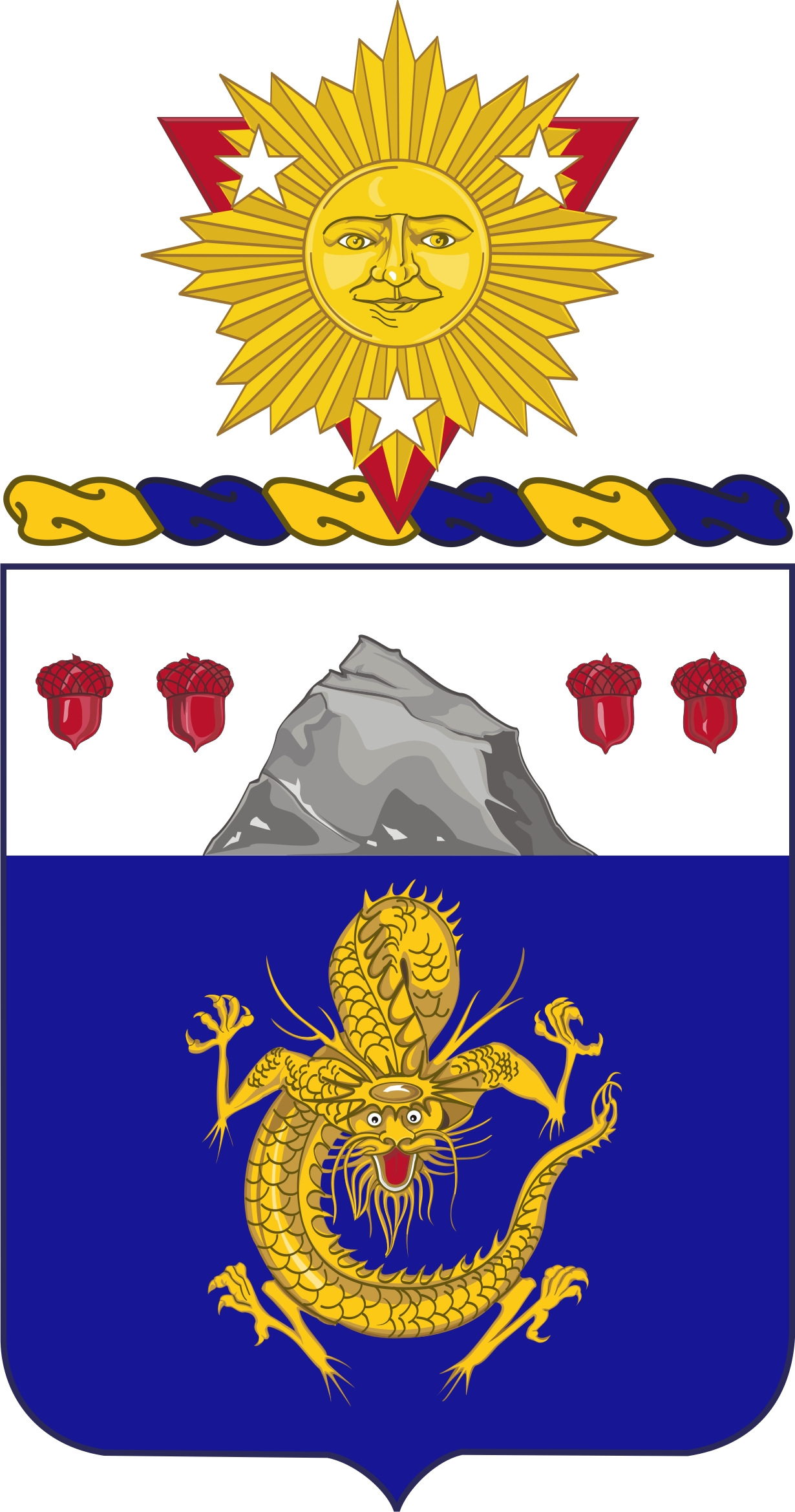
- Coat of arms
- Active: 1798–1800; 1812–1815; 1847–1848; 1861–present
- Country: United States
- Branch: United States Army
- Type: Infantry Branch
- Role: Combined Arms (3rd Battalion)
- Size: Regiment
- Part of: 2nd Armored Brigade Combat Team, 3rd Infantry Division
- Garrison/HQ: Fort Stewart (3-15 IN)
- Nickname: "The Old China Hands"
- Motto: Can Do
- Mascot: Dragon
- Equipment: M1 Abrams M2 Bradley
- Engagements: War of 1812; American Civil War; Indian Wars; Spanish–American War; Philippine–American War; Boxer Rebellion; World War II; Korean War; Gulf War; Iraq War; War in Afghanistan
- Decorations: Presidential Unit Citation; Valorous Unit Award; Meritorious Unit Citation; Navy Meritorious Unit Citation; Republic of Korea Presidential Unit Citation; Bravery Gold Medal of Greece Streamer “Korea” French Croix-de-Guerre Streamer “Colmar”

Commanders
- Commander: LTC Kenton C. Komives
- Command Sergeant Major: CSM Ezequiel R. Adame
- Notable commanders: William K. Naylor; George Marshall; Matthew Ridgway; Richard G. Stilwell

Insignia
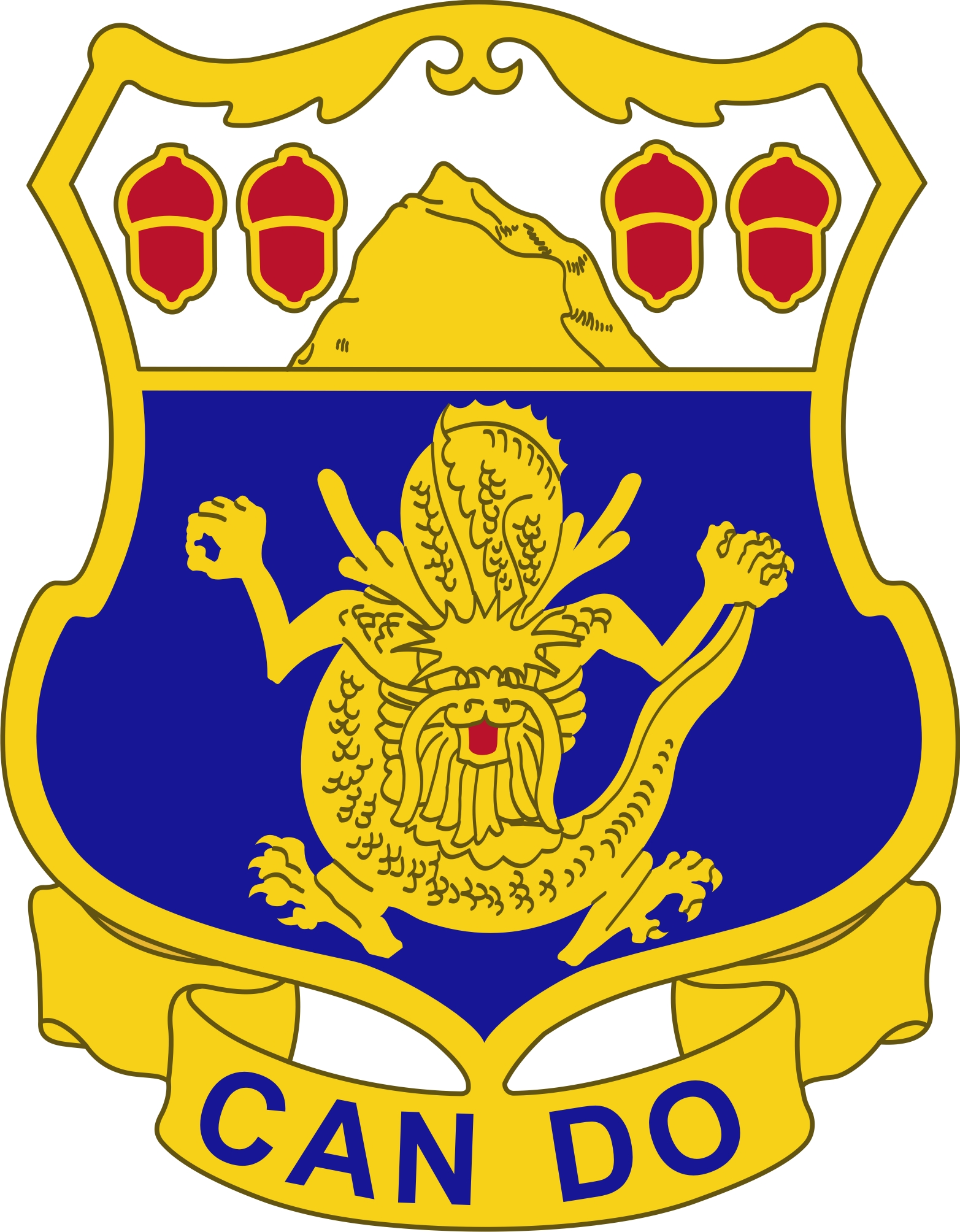
- Distinctive unit insignia

The 15th United States Infantry Regiment is a parent regiment in the United States Army. It has a lineage tracing back to the American Civil War, having participated in many battles.

== Previous 15th Regiments ==
The official Army history and lineage does not credit the current 15th Infantry with the honors or lineage of these earlier regiments.

The first 15th Infantry in the U.S. Army was organized on 16 July 1798 for the "Quasi-War" with France. The regiment saw no war service and was inactivated in 1800. A second 15th Infantry was activated in 1812 in New Jersey for service in Canada during the War of 1812. The 15th fought in the capture of Toronto and Fort George in April and May 1813, and covered the retreat of militia troops from Fort George in December 1813. A portion of the 15th were the last American troops to abandon Cornwall during the St. Lawrence Campaign of 1813. In this retreat, no member of the 15th was captured, despite taking heavy casualties. The 15th fought in the Champlain Valley campaign in autumn 1814 at Plattsburgh, and participated in General Dearborn's offensive in Ontario in October, and took part in many smaller battles that same year. The regiment was eliminated in the Army reorganization of 1815.

On 11 February 1847, a new 15th Infantry was activated for service in Mexico. As companies of the 15th arrived at Vera Cruz, they moved inland to join General Winfield Scott's army advancing on Mexico City. The regiment fought in the battles of Contreras and Churubusco, as well as smaller engagements before storming the walls of Chapultepec in Mexico City. Following garrison duty in Mexico City and Cuernavaca, the regiment returned to the United States for inactivation in August 1848.

== American Civil War ==
The current 15th Infantry was activated during the Civil War on 3 May 1861 by General Order No. 33. It was one of nine new Regular Army regiments, numbered 11 through 19, which were organized into three 8 company battalions. The battalions often operated independently of each other.

Its headquarters first in Wheeling, West Virginia then Cleveland, Ohio, then on to Newport Barracks, Kentucky and finally ending up in Fort Adams, Rhode Island in September 1862. Fort Adams served as the regiment's training depot were new recruits were trained and organized into companies before being sent to the front lines.

At the Battle of Shiloh on 7 April 1862, the 15th Infantry was the first new infantry regiment to engage in battle in the Civil War. In April–May 1862, the regiment marched toward and fought in the First Battle of Corinth, Mississippi. By the end of the Civil War, the regiment had fought in 22 major engagements, including Murfreesboro, Chickamauga, Chattanooga, and Atlanta as a part of Brigadier General John H. King's Brigade under Gen. Richard Johnson's Division, XIV Army Corps of the Army of the Cumberland. The regiment was a key element of the only regular brigade in Sherman's Army. The regiment's crest includes the acorn, the symbol of the Major General George Thomas's XIV Corps, and the mountains of stone to symbolize the corps' firm stand as the "Rock of Chickamauga". The four acorns represent the four major engagements.

During the Civil War, the regiment was commanded by Colonel Fitz John Porter from May 1861 to January 1863. Porter spent little time in actual command of the regiment after its original organization, as he was promoted to brigadier general of volunteers in August 1861. Porter served as a division and corps commander in the Army of the Potomac until he was dismissed from service in January 1863. During Porter's absence, the regiment was commanded by Lieutenant Colonel James P. Sanderson. Porter was succeed as regimental commander by Colonel Oliver L. Shepherd who served as such from January 1863 to December 1870.

== Reorganization ==
In September 1866 the regiment was reorganized. The first battalion continued as the 15th Infantry and was expanded from 8 to 10 companies. The 2nd Battalion became the 24th Infantry Regiment (consolidated with the 29th Infantry in 1869 to form the 11th Infantry) and the 3rd Battalion became the 33rd Infantry Regiment (consolidated in 1869 with the 8th Infantry). In 1869 the 35th Infantry Regiment was consolidated with the 15th Infantry. (Note that the 24th Infantry Regiment mentioned above should not be confused with the African-American 24th Infantry Regiment which was formed in 1869 by the consolidation of the 38th and 41st Infantry Regiments.)

== Reconstruction to Spanish–American War ==
Following the Civil War, the 15th Infantry served on occupation duty in Alabama until 1869. The regiment redeployed to the West, serving in Missouri, New Mexico, the Dakotas, and Colorado. The regiment remained in New Mexico for a little over 12 years. At the end of that time, the headquarters and six companies were sent to Ft. Lewis, Colorado; three companies to Fort Lyon, Colorado; with one company remaining in Santa Fe, New Mexico. In 1879 and 1880 the regiment was deeply involved in operations against the Mimbres Apaches under the warrior Victorio in New Mexico and received a campaign streamer for those operations.

In October and November 1882, the regiment was transferred to the Department of Dakota: Headquarters, A, C, D, and H Companies took station at Fort Randall, South Dakota; B and I Companies at Pembina, North Dakota; G and K Companies at Fort Lincoln, North Dakota; E and F Companies at Fort Stevenson, North Dakota.

=== Indian Wars ===
The 15th participated in campaigns against the Ute Tribe of Colorado and against the Mescalero Apaches. In May 1890, four companies proceeded to new posts in the Department of the East: A and G Companies moved to Mount Vernon Barracks, Alabama; D Company to Fort Barrancas, Florida; and K Company to Jackson Barracks, Louisiana. In July 1890 Companies I and K were skeletonized. Also in July, the headquarters and the five companies remaining in the Department of Dakota were assigned to Fort Sheridan, Illinois. In August, Companies E and H proceeded to Fort Sheridan. The regimental headquarters moved to Fort Sheridan in January 1891. The remaining companies from Dakota and the companies serving in the South completed their moves in May 1891. The final reconsolidation of all 15th Infantry companies after 12 years of being scattered throughout the West and South was concluded on 29 May 1891. While at Fort Sheridan the regiment played a vital role in containing the Chicago Railway Riots in July 1894.

The regiment remained as part of the Department of the Missouri until 15 October 1896, then served in the Department of Colorado from 19 October 1896 to 6 October 1898.

=== Spanish–American War ===
With the outbreak of the Spanish–American War in 1898, the regiment moved to Huntsville, Alabama, on 12 October for intensive training. On 27 November 1898, it sailed from Savannah, Georgia for Nuevitas, Cuba, for occupation duty. On 5 January 1900, the regiment sailed home to be posted throughout upper New York State and Vermont.

== Service in East Asia ==
The regimental headquarters, band, and First Battalion arrived in San Francisco on 16 July 1900. They immediately boarded the Transport Sumner and sailed for Nagasaki, Japan on 17 July. Later in July, Companies I, K, and L left their stations for San Francisco and went into camp at the Presidio. M Company also came from Fort McPherson at the same time. The First Battalion arrived at Nagasaki on 10 August. There they transferred to the Transport Indiana, and sailed for Tientsin via Taku on 13 August. The battalion arrived off of the Taku forts (already captured by the allies) on 16 August. During the latter part of the month, the Battalion reconnoitered and skirmished continuously over the same terrain where the 9th Infantry had lost 100 men killed in action (including their regimental commander, Colonel Liscum). Despite the fact that the Boxers had been dispersed several months before, numerous small bands of them were still operating in the country.

About 1 September, Companies A, B, and D were assigned the duty of escorting junks carrying supplies up the Pei Ho River to Peking. After completing this mission, Company C took station at Tientsin Arsenal on 6 September, while A Company occupied Tongku on 22 September. Through the latter part of November the battalion was engaged in almost daily expeditions against small bands of Boxers in nearby villages. On 25 November the First Battalion was relieved from duty with the China Relief Expedition and on 28 November arrived at Tongku. There it boarded the Transport Rosecrans and arrived at Nagasaki on 4 December, then continuing on to Manila, arriving on 13 December.

After lying at anchor in Manila Bay for eight days, the regiment sailed for Legaspi in the Province of Albay. On 24 December, Headquarters, the Band, and C and D Companies disembarked and took station at Legaspi. The transport continued to Tobacco, Albay, where B Company disembarked. Company A continued on to arrive at Mauban on 29 December. From then until 7 November 1901, the company conducted patrols to track the movement of the insurgent General Cailles. On 7 November, A Company moved to Bulan, Sorsogon and remained there until 28 December. It then moved on to the town of Sorsogon, in Sorsogon Province. It departed there on 5 March 1902 and arrived at Santa Elena, Samar on 11 March.

Company B remained at Tobacco until 30 July 1901, conducting patrols throughout that period. On 30 July B Company proceeded to the Island of Catanduanes. After five months of heavy scout work the company left for San Jose de Lagamoy, where it was engaged in tracking down bands of headhunters. On 31 July 1902 B Company returned to the regiment. C Company remained at Legaspi until 28 January 1902, when it left for the Island of Catanduanes. During the period 18 April to 31 July the company successively garrisoned Tabaco, Gubat, Santa Rita, Tones Island, Quentigean Island, and Balangigo. On 31 July it proceeded to Catbalogan and joined the regiment which was preparing to return to the United States. D Company remained on duty at Legaspi. Between 14 April and 31 July 1902 the company occupied Nueva Cacera (now Naga), Sorsogon, Bulan, and Point Binatao. On 31 July it left for the regimental assembly point at Catbalogan.

By April 1902, the balance of the regiment joined the 3rd Battalion in the Philippines and saw considerable action against the insurgents. The 2nd Battalion, which had remained in New York, did not appear in the Philippines until February 1902, just in time to turn around and return with its outfit in September to the United States. In September 1902 the regiment sailed for Monterey, California, where it built the current Presidio.

The next three years were uneventful. The unit placing seven men on the team of ten men from the Pacific Division in the Army's annual rifle competition in 1905.

In November 1905, the regiment was posted to Mindanao in the Philippines. When the 15th returned to the U.S. in 1907, it was assigned to Fort Douglas, Utah. After 1907 the next change of station did not come for four years, but when it did come the 15th Infantry left the United States for twenty-six years. Before this removal, the regiment's entrants won first, second and fourth honors in the individual competition, and five of its six contestants made the ten-man Army Rifle Team. The enlistments of 500 men had expired during 1908, and green recruits had filled the regiment at its home station in Utah and took part in a banquet given in their honor by the officers.

Elements of the regiment began to move to the Far East in November 1911. By mid-1912, Headquarters, the Band, and the 1st and 3rd Battalions were established at Tientsin, China as part of a multinational colonial effort designed to protect Western civilians during the Boxer Rebellion; the 2nd in the Philippines. The companies in the Philippines included F, G, and H at Camp Eldridge and Co. E at Camp John Hay. The detachments in P.I. never joined the rest, for the men were transferred from it to the 1st Battalion of the 31st Infantry in August 1916. Company L operated from Tongshan and M was at Kuyeh, China during this time. The 2nd Battalion was reorganized in Tientsin by transfer of personnel from the other two battalions. The mission of the regiment became difficult to define, and in the course of time the unit itself was transferred to the control of the State Department.

In line with new doctrine on organization, three provisional companies, Headquarters, Supply, and Machine Gun, were formed during August 1914, and in 1916 they were made permanent. That same year, World War I broke out in Europe, and most of the European nations withdrew their troops from China. The old "China Regiment" took over their patrolling. As a result, the regiment missed the fight in Europe, but it was often close to conflict in China. Armies of warlords roamed the land and sometimes threatened the American quarter. Christmas Day, 1925 was very tense, for 5,000 troops belonging to Feng Yuxiang, a warlord from the north, entered the area. Captain William "Wild Bill" Tuttle with nine men went out to warn off this force. As Tuttle's detachment approached, the advanced guard of the mass deployed and came on with fixed bayonets. The nine Americans blocked the road while Tuttle proceeded alone toward the Chinese and ordered them to make a detour, which they did. This incident is described in great detail in The Old China Hands (Doubleday 1961, chap. 8) by Charles G. Finney, who served in the 15th Infantry from 1925 to 1929.

The 1st Battalion went to the Philippines in August 1921, where eight years later, it was deactivated. In 1932, Companies G and L were also deactivated. This left six companies at their stations in Tientsin. George C. Marshall, later General of the Army, commanded it from 1924 to 1927.

Much of the 15th Infantry's tradition comes from the 26 years in China. The regiment's activities and way of life in Tsientsin are described very colorfully in The Old China Hands. The dragon on the regimental crest and the pidgin English motto "Can Do" symbolize its China service. Also many of the ceremonial properties of the 15th are from China, for example, the grand silver punch bowl with 50 silver cups and a silver tray & ladle. These items are currently stored in two regimental rooms, the Audie Murphy Room and General Marshall's Office at Fort Stewart 3rd Battalion 15th Regiment. As Finney mentions, The Chinese Memorial Gate now at Fort Moore was presented to the regiment in 1925 by local villagers in gratitude for being protected against the troops of warlord Feng's army.

The regiment left China on the transport Grant in February 1938.

== World War II, Korea and Cold War ==
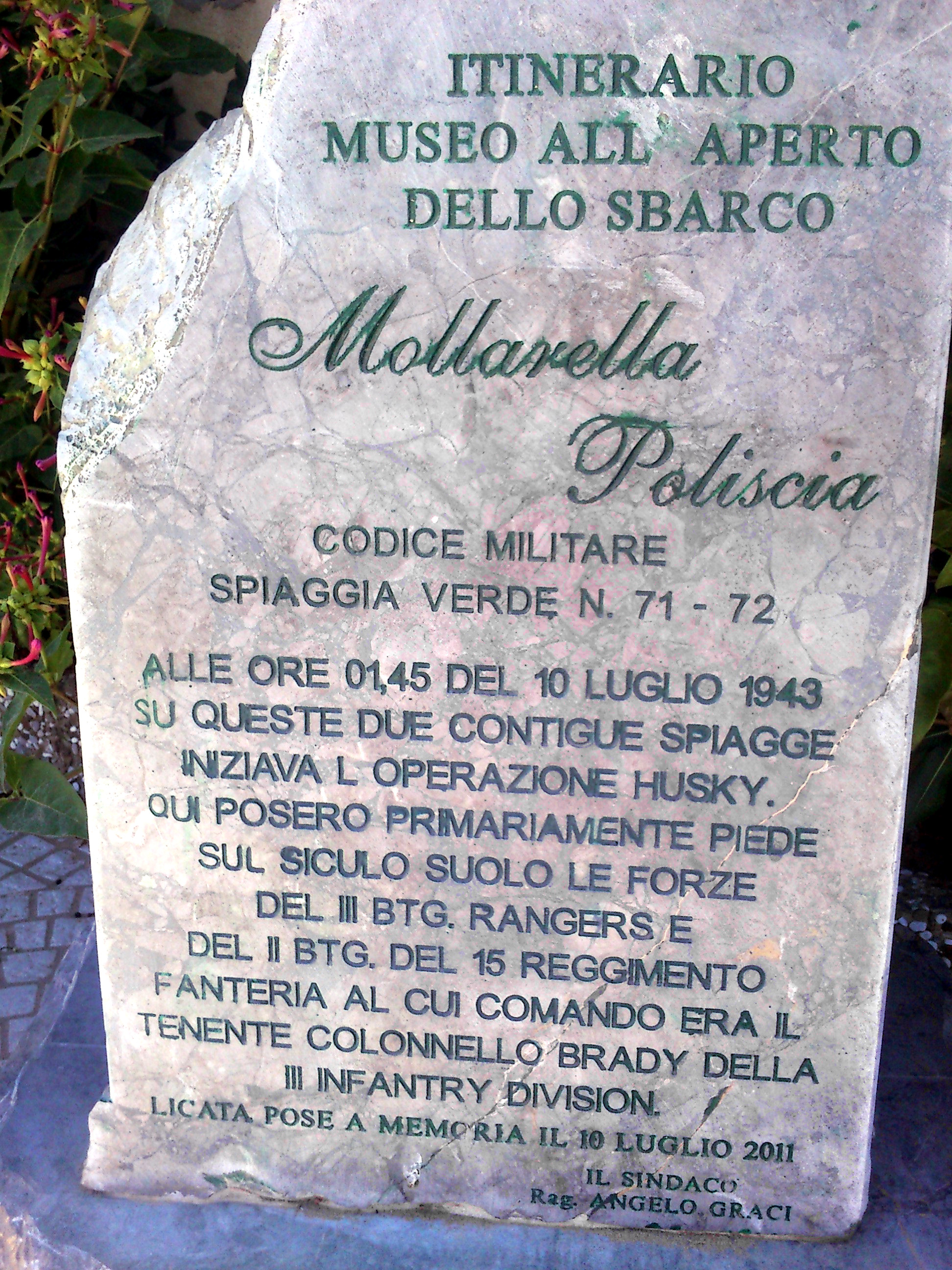

After the USS Panay incident, the 15th Infantry left China for Fort Lewis, Washington, on 2 March 1938. On 12 January 1940, the regiment was assigned to the 3rd Infantry Division. LTC Dwight D. Eisenhower served in the 15th from March to November 1940, as commander of 1st Battalion. On 24 October 1942, the 15th Infantry and the 3rd Infantry Division sailed from Norfolk, Virginia, bound for French Morocco. For the next 31 months, the regiment fought through French North Africa, Sicily, Italy, France, and Germany. On 10 July the 15th Infantry starting in Sicily at Licata at h.2.57, the Allied invasion of Sicily, called Operation Husky, at Mollarella and Poliscia beaches. By the end of the war in Europe, the 15th Infantry had sixteen Medals of Honor recipients including Audie Murphy, the most decorated combat soldier of World War II. The 15th Infantry Regiment's casualties during World War II included 1,633 killed, 5,812 wounded, and 419 missing in action.

Korean War

On 1 December 1948, the 15th Infantry was transferred from occupation duty in Germany to Fort Benning, Georgia. As part of the 3d Infantry Division, the regiment sailed for Korea on 31 August 1950. The 15th Infantry covered the withdrawal of X Corps from Chosin Reservoir in 1950, fought north to the 38th parallel in 1951, and fought in the Kumsong sector until the armistice was signed in 1953. At the time of the truce, the regiment had seen action in eight major campaigns and added three more Medal of Honor recipients, Emory L. Bennett (24 June 1951), Ola L. Mize (10 June and 11 June 1953) and Charles F. Pendleton (16 July and 17 July 1953). The Belgian Contingent that served alongside the 15th Infantry at the "Iron Triangle", borrowed its motto ("Can Do"), changing it to "Belgians Can Do Too!" for its own use.

Cold War

On 3 December 1954, the 15th infantry returned to Fort Benning. In 1957, the Army reorganized combat forces from regiments and battalions to battle groups. 1st and 2nd Battle Groups, 15th Infantry (bearing the lineages of the former Companies A and B) were assigned to Bamberg, West Germany as part of the 3d Infantry Division. These units maintained their "battle skills" by several deployments to Grafenwoehr and Hohenfels training centers as well as several REFORGER exercises. Another Army-wide force reorganization in 1963 eliminated battle groups in favor of brigades and battalions and the units were relocated to Kitzingen and Wildflicken, In December 1965, the 3rd and 4th Battalions were inactivated.

The 15th Infantry regimental headquarters and the 3rd Battalion were reactivated at Fort Stewart, Georgia, on 25 August 1989, as part of the 24th Infantry Division. The 4th battalion was reactivated in May 1987 at Fort Knox, Kentucky, as part of the 194th Armored Brigade. The "Can Do" battalion, formerly the 4th Battalion, 54th Infantry, was the only infantry battalion at Fort Knox. The battalion served not only as a mechanized infantry battalion (equipped with M113A1/A2 armored personnel carriers, APCs), but also in support of the United States Army Armor School during various training missions.

== Post-Cold War ==
From 20 August 1990 through 22 March 1991, the 3rd Battalion participated in Operation Desert Shield and Operation Desert Storm, to free Kuwait from Iraqi oppression. In 1993, the 3rd Battalion deployed three companies to Mogadishu, Somalia, to conduct combat operations in Operations Restore and Continue Hope. In 1994, the 2nd Battalion deployed to Macedonia to deter Serbian aggression. In 1994 the 3rd Battalion deployed one company to Haiti to support Operation Uphold Democracy. In 1995 1st Battalion deployed to Macedonia to deter Serbian aggression.

The 1st Battalion colors were returned from Germany in 1996. The 1-18 IN was reflagged as 1-15 IN on 15 February 1996. The actual reflagging ceremony was held at Fort Stewart on 25 April 1996. The 2nd Battalion was inactivated in 1996.

From 2000 to 2001, 3rd Battalion, 15th Infantry deployed to Camp McGovern in Bosnia as an element of Task Force Eagle in support of Operation Joint Forge.

=== War on Terrorism ===
U.S. Army Pfc. Michael Andrade, an infantryman with Bravo Company, 3rd Battalion, 15th Infantry Regiment, 4th Infantry Brigade Combat Team, 3rd Infantry Division, carries an M240B machine gun while on a foot patrol near Combat Outpost Soltan Khel in Wardak province, Afghanistan, 6 June 2013

The 1st and 3rd Battalions deployed to Iraq with the 3d Infantry Division in 2003 and again in 2005–06, with one battalion falling under the 42nd Infantry Division. The 1st Battalion deployed to Iraq for the third time in March 2007. The 3rd Battalion was inactivated and reflagged the same year at Fort Stewart, Georgia. In 2009 the 3rd Battalion was reactivated at Fort Stewart. The 1st Battalion deployed to Iraq in 2009 assuming responsibility for operations in ad-Diwaniyah and an-Najaf for Operation Iraqi Freedom VII and Operation New Dawn.

In early 2013, nearly all of 3rd Battalion deployed to Wardak Province, Afghanistan operating from Combat Outpost Soltan Kheyl and FOB Airborne. The unit suffered five casualties.

On 15 December 2015, the 1st Battalion at Fort Benning was inactivated.

The last remaining unit is the 3rd Battalion located at Fort Stewart in 2nd Brigade, 3rd Infantry Division. 3rd Battalion was the home of one of a small number of Special Reconnaissance Platoons created to better bridge the gap between conventional forces and Special Forces.

== Insignia ==
The shield is of white and blue, the old and the new colors of the Infantry. The Red Acorn was the badge of XIV Army Corps under which the 15th Infantry fought during the Civil war. The acorn is repeated four times to commemorate the four major engagements in which the regiment participated: Murfreesboro, Chickamauga, Chattanooga, and Atlanta. The rock denotes the fact that the regiment was under the Command of General George Henry Thomas for the battle in which he earned his famous sobriquet: "The Rock of Chickamauga". The Chinese dragon, in gold metal, is indicative of the regiment's service in China during the Boxer Rebellion from 1900 to 1938, of which the period after 1912 was continuous. The sunburst, triangle, and devices atop the coat of arms is symbolic of the Katipunan flag of the Philippine Insurrection.

The coat of arms was approved on 30 April 1923. It was amended to correct the blazon of the shield and crest on 14 July 1924.

== Campaign streamers ==
Civil War

- Shiloh
- Murfreesborough
- Chickamauga
- Chattanooga
- Atlanta
- Mississippi 1862
- Alabama 1862
- Tennessee 1862
- Tennessee 1863
- Kentucky 1862
- Georgia 1864

Indian Wars

- Utes
- New Mexico 1880

Philippine Insurrection

- Luzon 1900, 1901

China Relief Expedition

Without inscription

World War II

- Algeria-French Morocco (with arrowhead)
- Tunisia
- Sicily (with arrowhead)
- Naples-Foggia
- Anzio (with arrowhead)
- Rome-Arno
- Southern France (with arrowhead)
- Rhineland
- Ardennes-Alsace
- Central Europe

Korean War

- CCF Intervention
- First UN Counteroffensive
- CCF Spring Offensive
- UN Summer–Fall Offensive
- Second Korean Winter
- Korea, Summer–Fall 1952
- Third Korean Winter
- Korea, Summer 1953

Southwest Asia

- Defense of Saudi Arabia
- Liberation and Defense of Kuwait

Defense of Kosovo

War on Terrorism

- Iraq 2003
- Iraq 2005
- Iraq 2007
- Iraq 2010
- Afghanistan 2013

== Unit awards ==
The 15th Infantry didn't receive any separate Presidential Unit Citation for World War II.

Ribbon	Award	Streamer embroidered
Dark blue ribbon with a gold border	Presidential Unit Citation (Army): GO No. 15: 3rd Battalion, 3–8 August 1943, World War II	SAN FRATELLO
Dark blue ribbon with a gold border	Presidential Unit Citation (Army): GO No. 21: 1st Battalion, 27–29 August 1944, World War II	MONTELIMAR
Dark blue ribbon with a gold border	Presidential Unit Citation (Army): GO No. 44: 3rd Infantry Division, 22 January–6 February 1945, World War II	COLMAR
Dark Blue ribbon with a gold border	Presidential Unit Citation (Army): GO No. 75: Company L, 19–26 October 1943, World War II	
Dark Blue ribbon with a gold border	Presidential Unit Citation (Army): GO No. 123: Antitank Company, 18–20 April 1945, World War II	
Dark blue ribbon with a gold border	Presidential Unit Citation (Army)	KOWANG-NI
Dark blue ribbon with a gold border	Presidential Unit Citation (Army)	IRAQ 2003
blue, yellow, and red horizontal stripes	Presidential Unit Citation (Navy)	HWACHON RESERVOIR
Vertical stripes alternating red, blue, white, blue, white, red, white, blue, white, blue, red with gold border	Valorous Unit Award	IRAQ 2007-2008
Red ribbon	Meritorious Unit Commendation	IRAQ 2009-2010
Green ribbon with vertical blue, yellow red stripes mirrored on the edges	Navy Unit Commendation	PANMUNJOM
Red ribbon with vertical green stripes in the center and a palm leaf in the middle	French Croix de guerre with Palm	COLMAR
Red and Green woven citation cord with brass tip	French Fourragère in the colors of the Croix de guerre	
White ribbon with vertical green and red stripes on its edges and a red and blue circle in the middle	Republic of Korea Presidential Unit Citation	UIJONGBU CORRIDOR
White ribbon with vertical green and red stripes on its edges and a red and blue circle in the middle	Republic of Korea Presidential Unit Citation	IRON TRIANGLE
White ribbon with vertical green and red stripes on its edges and a red and blue circle in the middle	Republic of Korea Presidential Unit Citation	KOREA 1950–1952
The streamer has five alternating stripes (3 blue and two white) with the inscription in yellow	Chryssoun Aristion Andrias (Bravery Gold Medal of Greece)	KOREA 1950–1953

== Medal of Honor recipients ==
Civil War

- PVT William J. Carson – E Company

World War II

- SGT Sylvester Antolak – B Company
- 1LT Francis Xavier Burke – D Company
- PFC Herbert F. Christian – E Company
- 2LT Robert Craig – L Company
- 1LT Michael Joseph Daly – A Company
- PVT Elden Harvey Johnson – H Company
- 1LT Victor Leonard Kandle – I Company
- SSG Gus J. Kefurt – K Company
- PVT Joseph Frederick Merrell – I Company
- 2LT Audie Leon Murphy – B Company
- CPT Arlo L. Olson – Regiment
- PFC Henry Schauer – F Company
- 1LT John Joseph Tominac – I Company
- LTC Keith Lincoln Ware – 1st Battalion
- 1LT Eli Lamar Whiteley – L Company
- 1LT Donald K. Schwab – E Company

Korea

- PFC Emory Lawrence Bennett – B Company
- Charles R. Johnson - B Company
- SGT Ola Lee Mize – K Company
- CPL Charles F. Pendleton – D Company

Iraq

- SFC Alwyn Cashe - A Company

== Notable former members ==
- Major General John Batiste (Commander, 3rd Battalion)
- General Charles L. Bolte
- General Gary L. Brito (Commander, 1st Battalion, 2004-2006)
- Sergeant First Class Alwyn Cashe
- Specialist Richard T. Davis
- President Dwight D. Eisenhower (Commander, 1st Battalion)
- General Paul L. Freeman Jr.
- General of the Army George C. Marshall (Regimental executive officer)
- Colonel George K. McGunnegle (Regimental quartermaster and adjutant, commander of Companies G and I)
- Lieutenant General Benjamin R. Mixon (Commander, Company B)
- Major General John Frank Morrison (Regimental Commander)
- Major General Fitz John Porter (Regimental Commander)
- General Matthew B. Ridgeway (Regimental Commander)
- General William B. Rosson
- General Joseph Stilwell
- General Richard G. Stilwell (Regimental Commander)
- Brigadier General Asher Clayton Taylor
- Lieutenant General James L. Terry (XO, Company A)
- Lieutenant General Stephen Twitty (Commander, 3rd Battalion)
- General Walton H. Walker
- General Earle G. Wheeler

== See also ==
- List of United States Regular Army Civil War units
- Baker Boys: Inside the Surge
- In the Valley of Elah
- To Hell and Back
