= Richard Stilwell =

Richard Stilwell may refer to:

- Richard Stilwell (bass-baritone) (born 1942), American opera singer and vocal instructor
- Richard G. Stilwell (1917–1991), commander of American military forces in the Battle of Hamburger Hill
