= Baker Boys =

Baker Boys may refer to:

- Baker Boys: Inside the Surge, a 2010 documentary series
- Baker Boys (2011 TV series), a BBC TV Series
- Baker Boys (Thai TV series), a 2021 television adaptation of the manga Antique Bakery

== See also ==
- Baker Boy (born 1996), an Indigenous Australian musician and actor
- The Fabulous Baker Boys, a 1989 film
