= Jon Steele =

American expat author living in Europe

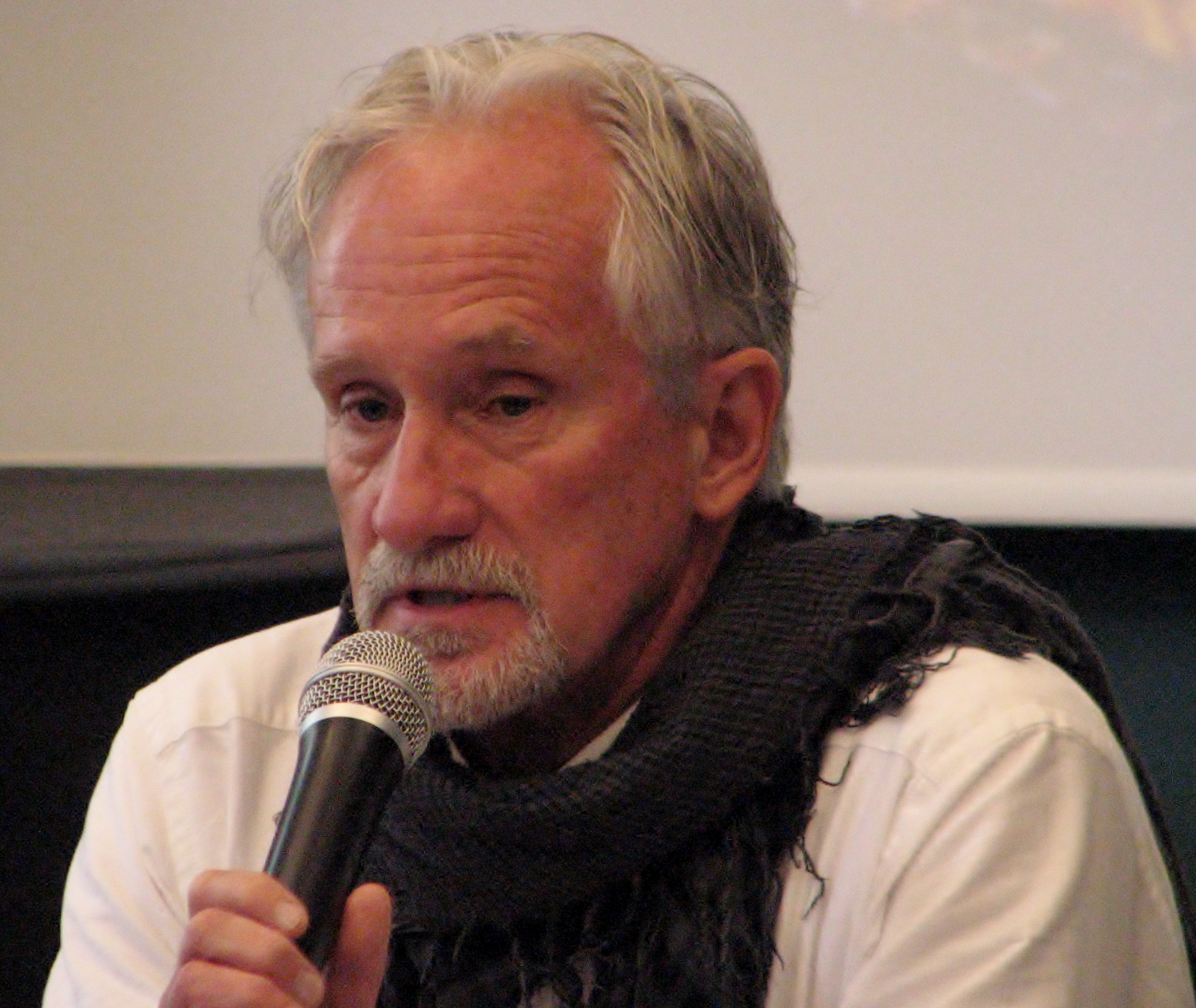
Jon Steele

Jon Steele (born in Spokane, Washington, 1950) is an American author living in Europe.

Steele's work among American soldiers in Iraq was edited into a four-part documentary series, Baker Boys: Inside the Surge. The program was first aired by HDNet in 2010, and received eight awards. The series has been screened on Discovery Channel and several broadcast outlets including New Zealand, Canada, Australia and Europe. It has also been made available on Netflix.

Steele's career as a news cameraman was profiled in two documentaries: Jon Blair's Reporters at War (2004); and Martyn Burke's Under Fire: Journalists in Combat (2012).

== Published works ==
- War Junkie, (2002) Transworld Publishers, London, ISBN 0-593-04998-5
- The Watchers (2011, 2012) Transworld Publishers, London, ISBN 978-0-593-06751-2; Penguin Group, New York, ISBN 978-0-399-15874-2
- Angel City (2013) Penguin Group, New York ISBN 978-0-399-15875-9; Transworld Publishers, London, ISBN 978-0-593-06741-3
- The Way of Sorrows] (2015) Penguin Group, New York, ISBN 978-0-399-171 49-9
