= John J. Tominac =

Colonel John J. Tominac
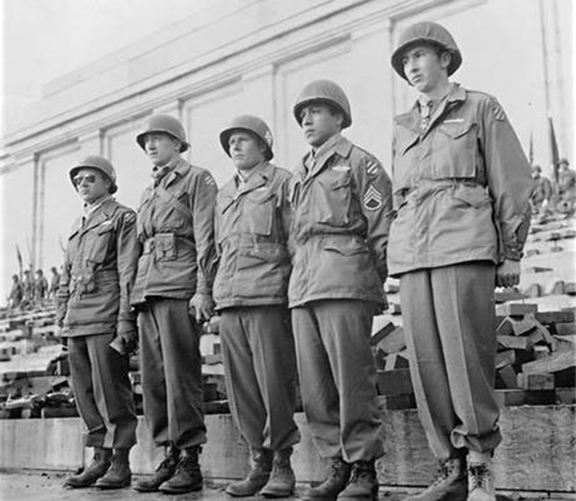
- Tominac (second from left) receives his Medal of Honor at the newly secured Zepplinfeld Stadium, Nuremberg, Germany (April 1945)
- Born: April 29, 1922; Conemaugh Township, Cambria County, Pennsylvania, US
- Died: July 11, 1998 (aged 76); Carmel-by-the-Sea, California
- Burial place: Arlington National Cemetery, Arlington County, Virginia
- Military career
- Allegiance: United States
- Branch: United States Army
- Rank: Colonel
- Units: 3rd Battalion, 15th Infantry Regiment, 3rd Infantry Division
- Conflicts: World War II; Korean War; Vietnam War
- Awards: Medal of Honor; Purple Heart

John Joseph Tominac (April 29, 1922 – July 11, 1998) was a United States Army officer of Croatian descent and a recipient of the United States military's highest decoration—the Medal of Honor—for his actions in World War II.

== Military career ==
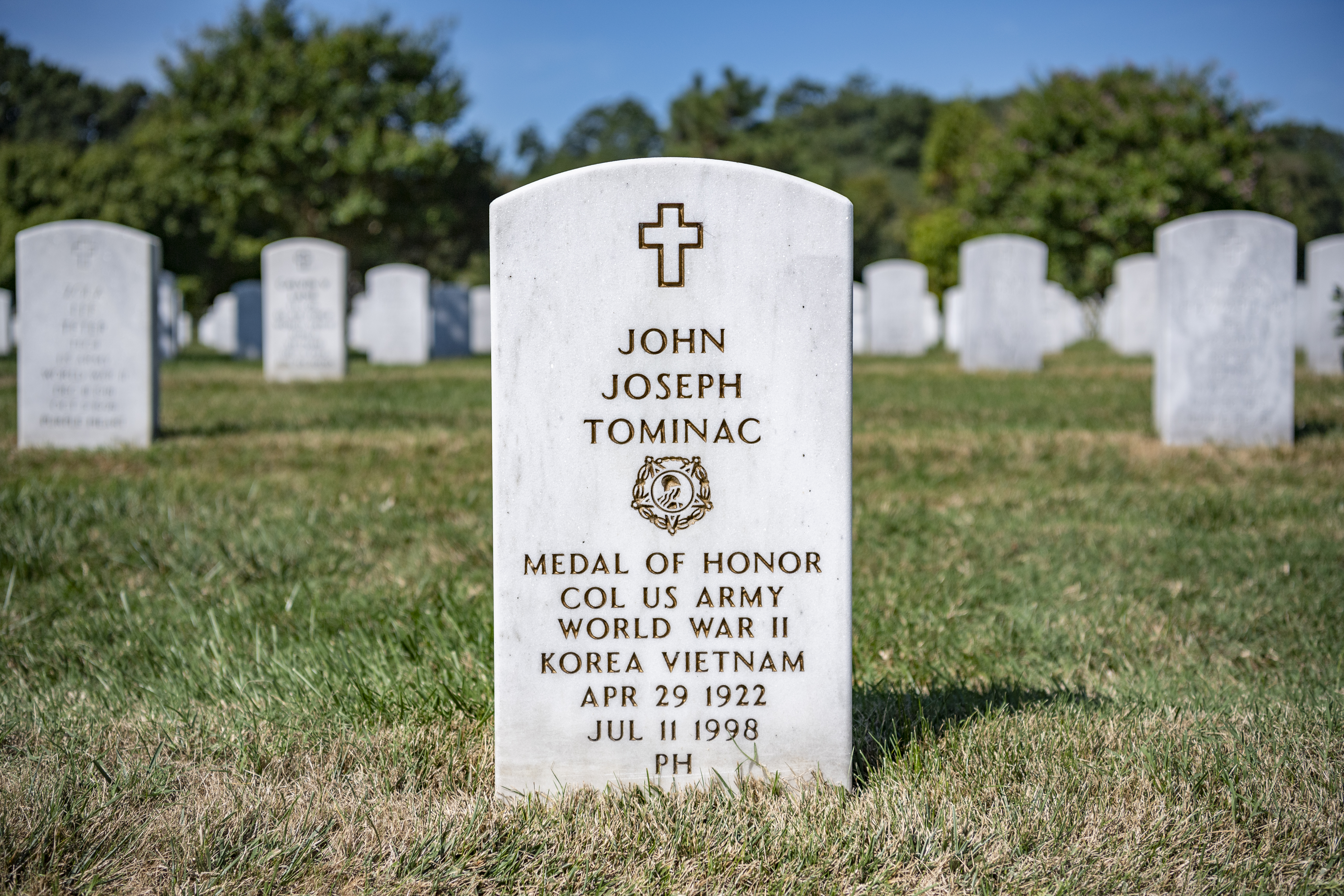
Tominac's grave at Arlington National Cemetery

Tominac joined the Army from Conemaugh, Pennsylvania in November 1941, and by September 12, 1944 was serving as a first lieutenant in Company I, 15th Infantry Regiment, 3rd Infantry Division. On that day, in Saulx de Vesoul, France, he repeatedly exposed himself to hostile fire in order to attack the German forces, even after being wounded. For his actions during the battle, he was awarded the Medal of Honor six months later, on March 29, 1945.

Tominac remained in the Army after World War II, reaching the rank of colonel and serving in both the Korean and Vietnam Wars. He died at age 76 and was buried in Arlington National Cemetery, Arlington County, Virginia.

== Legacy ==
First Lieutenant Tominac's official Medal of Honor citation reads:

For conspicuous gallantry and intrepidity at risk of life above and beyond the call of duty on September 12, 1944, in an attack on Saulx de Vesoul, France 1st Lt. Tominac charged alone over 50 yards of exposed terrain onto an enemy roadblock to dispatch a 3-man crew of German machine gunners with a single burst from his Thompson machinegun. After smashing the enemy outpost, he led 1 of his squads in the annihilation of a second hostile group defended by mortar, machinegun, automatic pistol, rifle and grenade fire, killing about 30 of the enemy. Reaching the suburbs of the town, he advanced 50 yards ahead of his men to reconnoiter a third enemy position which commanded the road with a 77-mm. SP gun supported by infantry elements. The SP gun opened fire on his supporting tank, setting it afire with a direct hit. A fragment from the same shell painfully wounded 1st Lt. Tominac in the shoulder, knocking him to the ground. As the crew abandoned the M-4 tank, which was rolling down hill toward the enemy, 1st Lt. Tominac picked himself up and jumped onto the hull of the burning vehicle. Despite withering enemy machinegun, mortar, pistol, and sniper fire, which was ricocheting off the hull and turret of the M-4, 1st Lt. Tominac climbed to the turret and gripped the 50-caliber antiaircraft machinegun. Plainly silhouetted against the sky, painfully wounded, and with the tank burning beneath his feet, he directed bursts of machinegun fire on the roadblock, the SP gun, and the supporting German infantrymen, and forced the enemy to withdraw from his prepared position. Jumping off the tank before it exploded, 1st Lt. Tominac refused evacuation despite his painful wound. Calling upon a sergeant to extract the shell fragments from his shoulder with a pocketknife, he continued to direct the assault, led his squad in a hand grenade attack against a fortified position occupied by 32 of the enemy armed with machineguns, machine pistols, and rifles, and compelled them to surrender. His outstanding heroism and exemplary leadership resulted in the destruction of 4 successive enemy defensive positions, surrender of a vital sector of the city Saulx de Vesoul, and the death or capture of at least 60 of the enemy.

The Maple Street Bridge in Johnstown, Pennsylvania, in his home county of Cambria County, was named the Colonel John Joseph Tominac Memorial Bridge in his honor.

== See also ==
- List of Medal of Honor recipients
- List of Medal of Honor recipients for World War II
