= Donald K. Schwab =

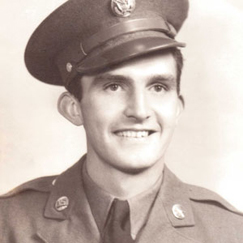
- Born: December 6, 1918; Hooper, Nebraska
- Died: February 19, 2005 (aged 86); Omaha, Nebraska
- Burial place: Hooper Cemetery, Hooper, Nebraska; 41.603534°N 96.542110°W
- Spouse: Maralee Janssen Schwab (m. 1946)
- Children: 6
- Military career
- Allegiance: United States
- Branch: United States Army
- Service years: 1941-1945
- Rank: First Lieutenant
- Units: Company E, 15th Infantry Regiment, 3rd Infantry Division
- Conflicts: World War II
- Awards: Medal of Honor; Bronze Star Medal; Purple Heart (3)
- Other work: Mail carrier

Donald Kenneth Schwab (December 6, 1918 – February 19, 2005) was a United States Army veteran of World War II and recipient of the Medal of Honor.

== Early life and military service ==
Donald K. Schwab was born on December 6, 1918, near Hooper, Nebraska, to Harry J. and Catherine Alvina Schwein Schwab. One of seven children, he attended country school in District 15 and graduated from Hooper High School in 1936. Schwab's family was of predominantly German descent and practicing Lutherans.

Schwab registered for the draft in October 1940 and was inducted into the Army on June 16, 1941. Stationed at Fort Leonard Wood, Missouri, since his induction, Schwab was selected for infantry officer candidate school at Fort Benning, Georgia, in May 1942. After graduation, he was assigned to Company H, 390th Infantry Regiment, 98th Infantry Division, at Camp Breckinridge, Kentucky. In April 1943, he was reassigned to the Army Ground Forces Overseas Replacement Depot at Camp Reynolds, Mercer County, Pennsylvania. Schwab was sent overseas and assigned to the 15th Infantry Regiment, 3rd Infantry Division. On October 13, 1943, he was wounded in the leg in Italy, necessitating his evacuation to a military hospital in North Africa.

Schwab returned to duty in the spring of 1944. Schwab was wounded in action a second time in June. For his actions in combat on September 17, 1944, near Lure, France, Schwab was awarded the Distinguished Service Cross for leading his company in repeated assaults across an open field against entrenched German positions in a treeline that had pinned down his unit with machine gun and machine pistol fire. After two American attacks had been checked, resulting in several casualties, Schwab reorganized his unit and arranged for the evacuation of the wounded. Schwab ordered his men to press the attack for a third time, and after halting them short of the objective and having them take cover, singlehandedly crept forward under fire and surprised an enemy gunner in his foxhole, knocking him senseless with the butt of his carbine and taking him prisoner. Schwab's actions disorganized the enemy forces, causing them to withdraw.

Schwab was wounded a third time (a minor wound on the upper lip) in October, and a fourth time (in the right arm) on November 2. His arm wound was serious enough to necessitate his return to the United States for further treatment and convalescence at Winter General Hospital in Topeka, Kansas, during which time he received leave to visit his parents. Schwab was released from the hospital in August 1945.

== Medal of Honor ==
The National Defense Authorization Act of 2002 called for a review of the service records of approximately 600 mostly Jewish American and Hispanic American veterans of World War II, the Korean War and the Vietnam War to ensure that no prejudice was shown to those who participated in actions possibly deserving an award the Medal of Honor. Schwab was among five additional service members who the review identified as having been overlooked for the honor. Schwab was awarded the Army Medal of Honor posthumously by President Barack Obama in a March 18, 2014 ceremony in the White House; Schwab's son Terry accepted the medal from the president on behalf of his late father.

Schwab's son, Dr. Terry Schwab (left), accepted the Medal of Honor on behalf of his late father during a White House ceremony in 2014.

=== Citation ===
First Lieutenant Donald K. Schwab distinguished himself by acts of gallantry and intrepidity above and beyond the call of duty while serving as the Commander of Company E, 15th Infantry Regiment, 3d Infantry Division, during combat operations against an armed enemy near Lure, France on September 17, 1944. That afternoon, as First Lieutenant Schwab led his company across four hundred yards of exposed ground, an intense, grazing burst of machinegun and machine-pistol fire sprung forth without warning from a fringe of woods directly in front of the American force. First Lieutenant Schwab quickly extricated his men from the attempted ambush and led them back to a defiladed position. Soon after, he was ordered to overwhelm the enemy line. He rapidly organized his men into a skirmish line and, with indomitable courage, again led them forward into the lethal enemy fire. When halted a second time, First Lieutenant Schwab moved from man to man to supervise collection of the wounded and organize his company’s withdrawal. From defilade, he rallied his decimated force for a third charge on the hostile strong point and successfully worked his way to within fifty yards of the Germans before ordering his men to hit the dirt. While automatic weapons fire blazed around him, he rushed forward alone, firing his carbine at the German foxholes, aiming for the vital enemy machine-pistol nest which had sparked the German resistance and caused heavy casualties among his men. Silhouetted through the mist and rain by enemy flares, he charged to the German emplacement, ripped the half-cover off the hostile firing pit, struck the German gunner on the head with his carbine butt and dragged the German back through a hail of fire to friendly lines. First Lieutenant Schwab’s action so disorganized hostile infantry resistance that the enemy forces withdrew, abandoning their formidable defensive line. First Lieutenant Schwab’s extraordinary heroism and selflessness above and beyond the call of duty are in keeping with the highest traditions of military service and reflect great credit upon himself, his unit and the United States Army.

== Later life ==
After leaving the Army, Schwab returned to his family's farm near Hooper. He married Maralee Janssen on September 18, 1946. In 1951, he took a job as a rural mail carrier with the United States Postal Service, from which he retired in 1980. Donald K. Schwab died on February 19, 2005, at the University of Nebraska Medical Center, in Omaha, Nebraska. He was preceded in death by his parents, four sisters, two brothers, an infant daughter, and a grandson, being survived by his wife, three daughters, and two sons.

== Awards and decorations ==

Badge	Combat Infantryman Badge		
1st row	Medal of Honor Upgraded from DSC, 2014		
2nd row	Bronze Star Medal Retroactively Awarded, 1947	Purple Heart with 2 Oak leaf clusters	American Defense Service Medal
3rd row	American Campaign Medal	European–African–Middle Eastern Campaign Medal with Arrowhead Device and 5 Campaign stars	World War II Victory Medal

3rd Infantry Division Insignia

== See also ==
- List of Medal of Honor recipients for World War II
