= Victor L. Kandle =

United States Army Medal of Honor recipient

Victor Leonard Kandle
- Born: June 13, 1921; Roy, Washington, US
- Died: December 31, 1944 (aged 23) near La Forge, France
- Burial place: Epinal American Cemetery and Memorial, Épinal, France
- Military career
- Allegiance: United States
- Branch: United States Army
- Service years: 1940–1944
- Rank: First Lieutenant
- Units: 15th Infantry Regiment, 3rd Infantry Division
- Conflicts: World War II
- Awards: Medal of Honor; Silver Star; Purple Heart

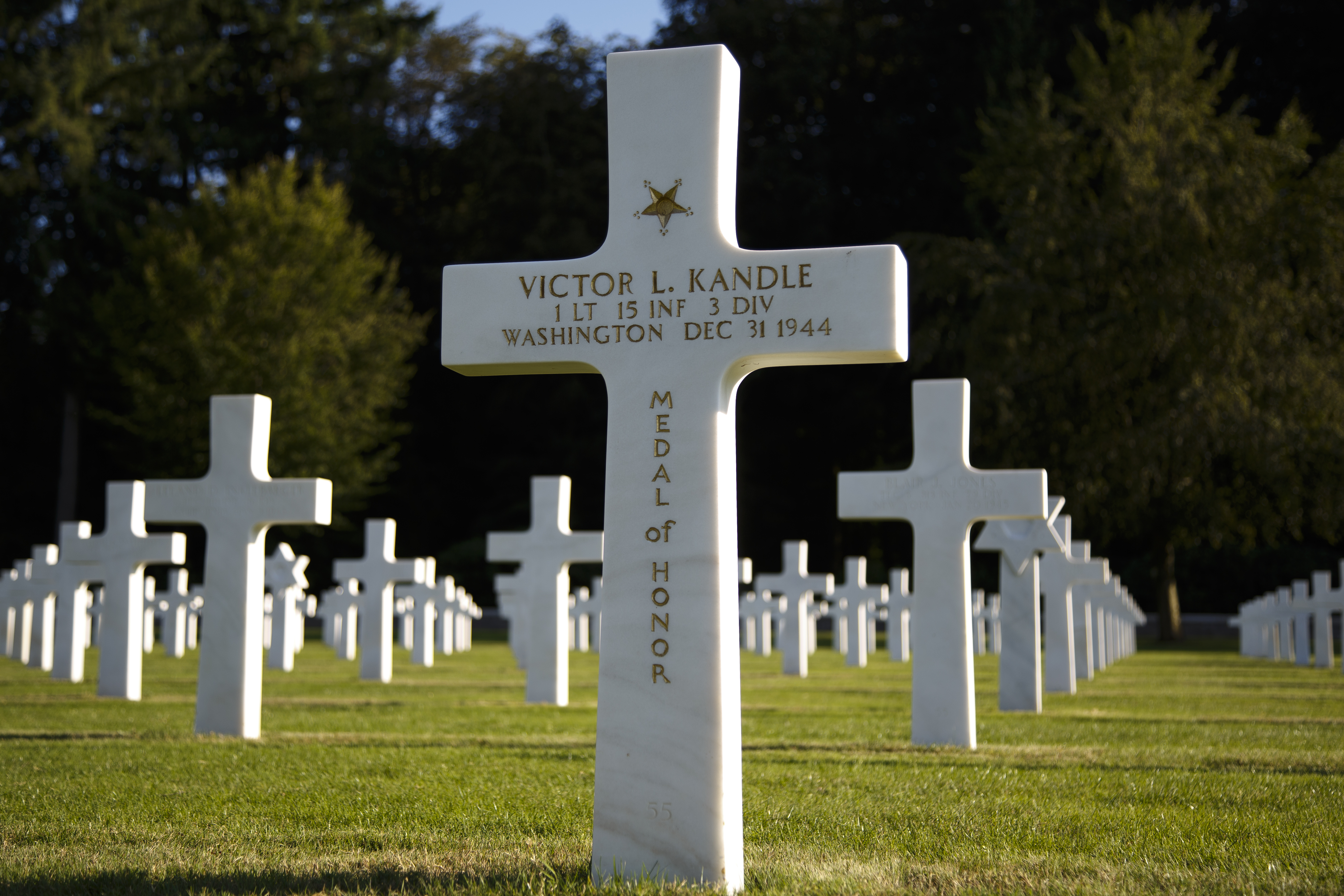
Kandle's grave at the Epinal American Cemetery and Memorial

Victor Leonard Kandle (June 13, 1921 – December 31, 1944) was a United States Army officer and a recipient of the United States military's highest decoration—the Medal of Honor—for his actions in World War II.

== Biography ==
Born in Roy, Washington, on June 13, 1921, Kandle joined the Army from Redwood City, California in September 1940. He served in Europe as a first lieutenant with the 15th Infantry Regiment, 3rd Infantry Division. On October 9, 1944, near La Forge, France, he led his platoon in the capture of a German stronghold and the destruction of two machine gun emplacements. Then, with his men providing supporting fire, he attacked a fortified house and forced the Germans inside to surrender. He was killed in action two months later and, on May 11, 1945, was posthumously awarded the Medal of Honor for his actions near La Forge.

Kandle was buried at the Epinal American Cemetery and Memorial in Épinal, France.

Kandle Hall, a United States Army Reserve facility in Tacoma, Washington, is named in his honor.

== Medal of Honor citation ==
First Lieutenant Kandle's official Medal of Honor citation reads:

For conspicuous gallantry and intrepidity at risk of his life above and beyond the call of duty. On 9 October 1944, at about noon, near La Forge, France, 1st Lt. Kandle, while leading a reconnaissance patrol into enemy territory, engaged in a duel at pointblank range with a German field officer and killed him. Having already taken 5 enemy prisoners that morning, he led a skeleton platoon of 16 men, reinforced with a light machinegun squad, through fog and over precipitous mountain terrain to fall on the rear of a German quarry stronghold which had checked the advance of an infantry battalion for 2 days. Rushing forward, several yards ahead of his assault elements, 1st Lt. Kandle fought his way into the heart of the enemy strongpoint, and, by his boldness and audacity, forced the Germans to surrender. Harassed by machinegun fire from a position which he had bypassed in the dense fog, he moved to within 15 yards of the enemy, killed a German machinegunner with accurate rifle fire and led his men in the destruction of another machinegun crew and its rifle security elements. Finally, he led his small force against a fortified house held by 2 German officers and 30 enlisted men. After establishing a base of fire, he rushed forward alone through an open clearing in full view of the enemy, smashed through a barricaded door, and forced all 32 Germans to surrender. His intrepidity and bold leadership resulted in the capture or killing of 3 enemy officers and 54 enlisted men, the destruction of 3 enemy strongpoints, and the seizure of enemy positions which had halted a battalion attack.

== Awards and decorations ==

Badge	Combat Infantryman Badge		
1st row	Medal of Honor		Silver Star
2nd row	Bronze Star Medal	Purple Heart	American Defense Service Medal
3rd row	American Campaign Medal	European–African–Middle Eastern Campaign Medal with three campaign stars	World War II Victory Medal

== See also ==
- List of Medal of Honor recipients for World War II
