= Eli L. Whiteley =

American WWII captain (1913–1986)

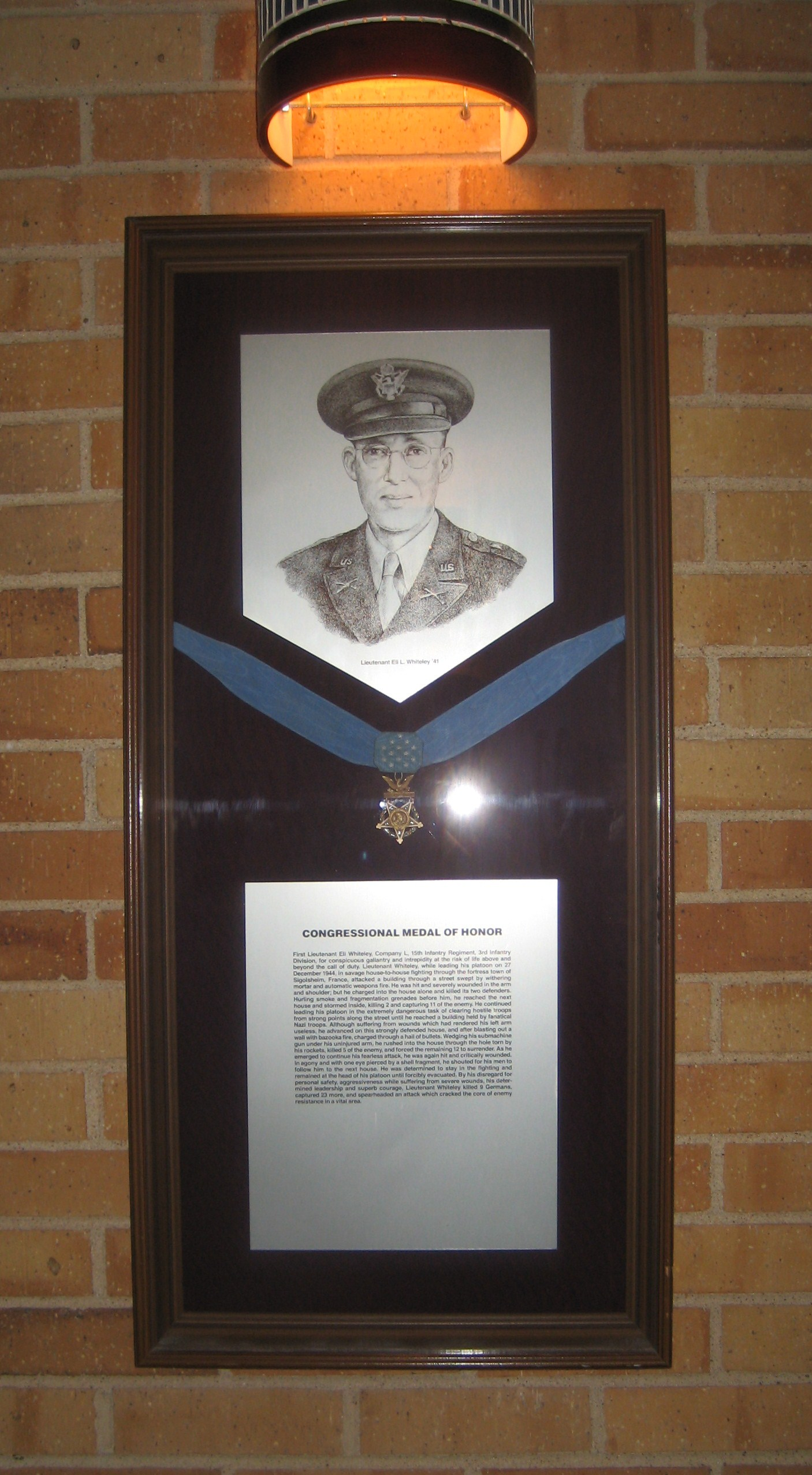
- Eli L. Whiteley and an exhibit Medal of Honor on display at Texas A&M University
- Born: December 10, 1913; Georgetown, Texas
- Died: December 2, 1986 (aged 72); College Station, Texas
- Burial place: College Station Cemetery, College Station, Texas
- Military career
- Allegiance: United States of America
- Branch: United States Army
- Service years: 1942–1946
- Rank: Captain
- Units: Company L, 15th Infantry, 3rd Infantry Division
- Conflicts: World War II
- Awards: Medal of Honor; Purple Heart; Combat Infantryman Badge

Eli Lamar Whiteley (December 10, 1913 – December 2, 1986) was a former infantry captain in the United States Army who received the Medal of Honor for valor in World War II, for his actions in Sigolsheim, France in 1944. He was drafted into the US Army in April 1942, and was discharged in May 1946.

== Personal life ==
Whiteley graduated from Texas A&M with a bachelor's degree in science in 1941. He then entered North Carolina State University before being drafted. After the war, he returned to NC State and earned his Master's degree.

After earning his Master's degree, he returned to Texas A&M as a lecturer in agronomy, and earned a Ph.D in agronomy in 1959.

Whiteley and his wife, Anna, had 5 children. He died of a heart attack on December 2, 1986.

== Medal of Honor ==
Whiteley's Medal of Honor citation reads:

While leading his platoon on December 27, 1944, in savage house-to-house fighting through the fortress town of Sigolsheim, France, he attacked a building through a street swept by withering mortar and automatic weapons fire. He was hit and severely wounded in the arm and shoulder; but he charged into the house alone and killed its 2 defenders. Hurling smoke and fragmentation grenades before him, he reached the next house and stormed inside, killing 2 and capturing 11 of the enemy. He continued leading his platoon in the extremely dangerous task of clearing hostile troops from strong points along the street until he reached a building held by fanatical Nazi troops. Although suffering from wounds which had rendered his left arm useless, he advanced on this strongly defended house, and after blasting out a wall with bazooka fire, charged through a hail of bullets. Wedging his submachine gun under his uninjured arm, he rushed into the house through the hole torn by his rockets, killed 5 of the enemy and forced the remaining 12 to surrender. As he emerged to continue his fearless attack, he was again hit and critically wounded. In agony and with 1 eye pierced by a shell fragment, he shouted for his men to follow him to the next house. He was determined to stay in the fighting and remained at the head of his platoon until forcibly evacuated. By his disregard for personal safety, his aggressiveness while suffering from severe wounds, his determined leadership and superb courage, 1st Lt. Whiteley killed 9 Germans, captured 23 more and spearheaded an attack which cracked the core of enemy resistance in a vital area.

== See also ==
- List of Medal of Honor recipients for World War II
