= Charles F. Pendleton =

United States Army Medal of Honor recipient

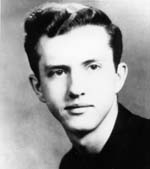
- Charles Pendleton
- Born: September 26, 1931; Camden, Tennessee, United States
- Died: July 17, 1953 (aged 21); Kumsong, North Korea
- Burial place: Laurel Land Memorial Park Fort Worth, Texas
- Military career
- Allegiance: United States
- Branch: United States Army
- Service years: 1951–1953
- Rank: Corporal
- Units: Company D, 15th Infantry Regiment, 3rd Infantry Division
- Conflicts: Korean War: Battle of Kumsong †
- Awards: Medal of Honor; Purple Heart

Charles Frank Pendleton (September 26, 1931 – July 17, 1953) was a soldier in the United States Army during the Korean War. He posthumously received the Medal of Honor for his actions on 16–17 July 1953 during the Battle of Kumsong.

Pendleton joined the army from Fort Worth, Texas in 1951. He is buried at Laurel Land Memorial Park in Fort Worth.

== Medal of Honor citation ==
=== Medal of Honor ===
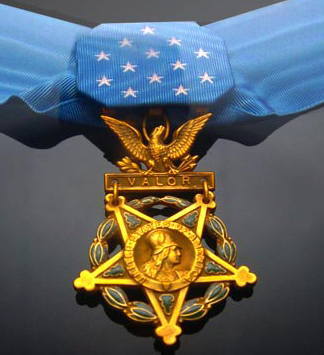

Charles F. Pendleton
Rank and organization: Corporal, U.S. Army, Company D, 15th Infantry Regiment, 3rd Infantry Division
Place and date: Near Choo Gung-Dong, Korea, 16 and July 17, 1953
Entered service at: Fort Worth, Texas
Born: September 26, 1931, Camden, Tennessee
Awarded for actions during: Korean War

Citation:

The President of the United States of America, in the name of Congress, takes pride in presenting the Medal of Honor (Posthumously) to Corporal Charles F. Pendleton (ASN: 25916461), United States Army, for conspicuous gallantry and indomitable courage above and beyond the call of duty while serving with Company D, 15th Infantry Regiment, 3d Infantry Division, in action against enemy aggressor forces at Choo Gung-Dong, Korea, on 16 and 17 July 1953. After consolidating and establishing a defensive perimeter on a key terrain feature, friendly elements were attacked by a large hostile force. Corporal Pendleton delivered deadly accurate fire into the approaching troops, killing approximately 15 and disorganizing the remainder with grenades. Unable to protect the flanks because of the narrow confines of the trench, he removed the machinegun from the tripod and, exposed to enemy observation, positioned it on his knee to improve his firing vantage. Observing a hostile infantryman jumping into the position, intent on throwing a grenade at his comrades, he whirled about and killed the attacker, then inflicted such heavy casualties on the enemy force that they retreated to regroup. After reorganizing, a second wave of hostile soldiers moved forward in an attempt to overrun the position and, later, when a hostile grenade landed nearby, Corporal Pendleton quickly retrieved and hurled it back at the foe. Although he was burned by the hot shells ejecting from his weapon, and was wounded by a grenade, he refused evacuation and continued to fire on the assaulting force. As enemy action increased in tempo, his machinegun was destroyed by a grenade but, undaunted, he grabbed a carbine and continued his heroic defense until mortally wounded by a mortar burst. Corporal Pendleton's unflinching courage, gallant self-sacrifice, and consummate devotion to duty reflect lasting glory upon himself and uphold the finest traditions of the military service.

== Awards and decorations ==
Pendelton was awarded the following:

Badge	Combat Infantryman Badge		
1st row	Medal of Honor	Purple Heart	National Defense Service Medal
2nd row	Korean Service Medal with 3 Campaign stars	United Nations Service Medal Korea	Korean War Service Medal Retroactively Awarded, 2003
Unit Awards	Korean Presidential Unit Citation		

3rd Infantry Division Insignia

== See also ==
- List of Medal of Honor recipients
- List of Korean War Medal of Honor recipients
