= Hooper, Nebraska =

- City
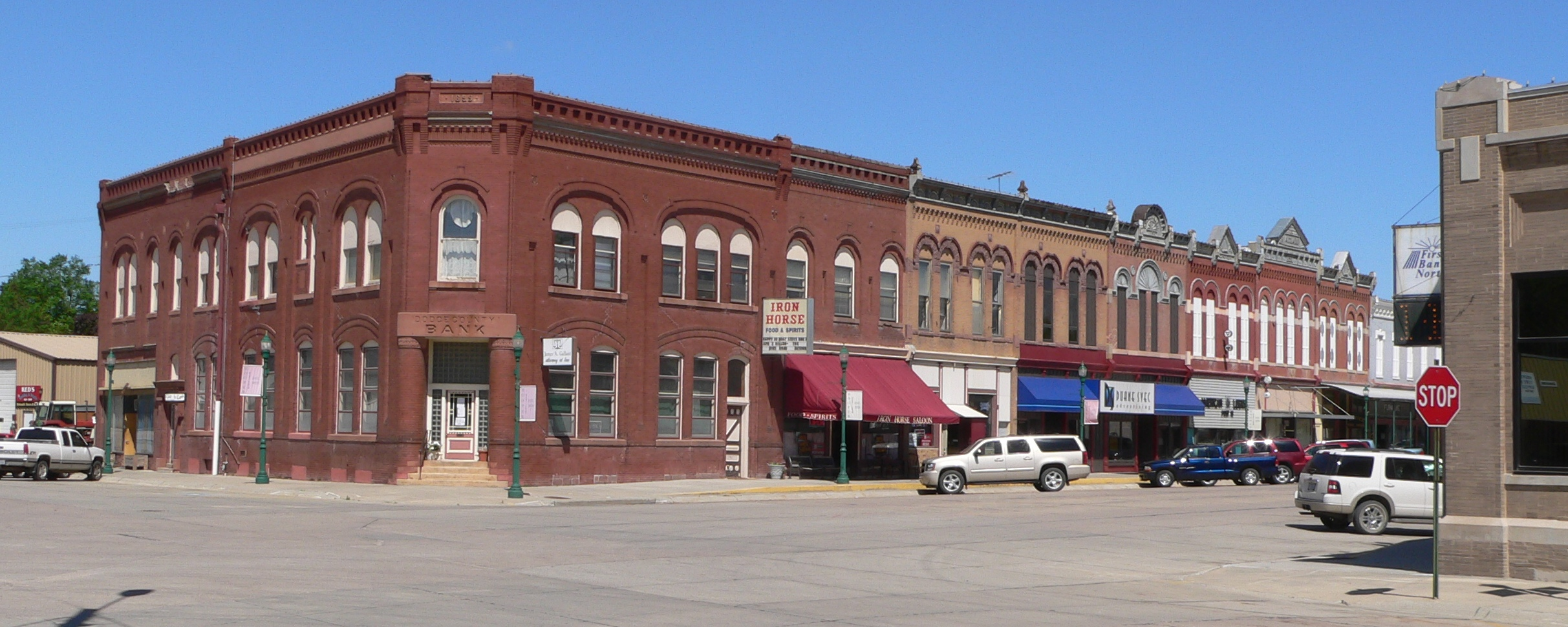
- Downtown Hooper: northwest corner of Main and Fulton

- Location of Hooper, Nebraska
- Coordinates: 41°36′42″N 96°32′56″W
- Country: United States
- State: Nebraska
- County: Dodge

Area
  - Total: 0.69 sq mi (1.79 km^{2})
  - Land: 0.68 sq mi (1.76 km^{2})
  - Water: 0.012 sq mi (0.03 km^{2})
- Elevation: 1,227 ft (374 m)

Population (2020)
  - Total: 857
  - Density: 1,259.0/sq mi (486.12/km^{2})
- Time zone: UTC-6 (Central (CST))
  - Summer (DST): UTC-5 (CDT)
- ZIP code: 68031
- Area code: 402
- FIPS code: 31-23025
- GNIS feature ID: 2394414

Hooper is a city in Dodge County, Nebraska, United States. The population was 857 at the 2020 census.

== History ==
Hooper was established in 1871, following construction of the Fremont, Elkhorn and Missouri Valley Railroad through the territory. It was named for Samuel Hooper, a US congressman from Massachusetts.

By the 1970s, the future of railroad service came into question. The Chicago & North Western was running fewer trains through town. Throughout the decade, the train traffic continued to decline. This sparked a lot of discussion about abandonment. In spring of 1982, flooding from the Elkhorn River & nearby Pebble Creek damaged the track. With the declining freight traffic levels & flooding damage, the C&NW promptly filed a request with the Interstate Commerce Commission to abandon the line. Permission was granted later that year, leaving the tracks with a dismal future.

In 1986, railroad service was revived by the newly formed Fremont & Elkhorn Valley Railroad (FEVR), which took ownership of the abandoned C&NW track. However, a bridge north of Nickerson was deemed unsafe to cross in 2003; as a result, FEVR embargoed train service through Hooper. In summer 2021, the tracks were dismantled as part of an effort to construct a bike path following the old railroad route.

== Geography ==
According to the United States Census Bureau, the city has a total area of 0.66 square miles (1.71 km^{2}), of which 0.65 square miles (1.68 km^{2}) is land and 0.01 square miles (0.03 km^{2}) is water.

== Demographics ==
Historical population
Census	Pop.	Note	%±
1880	204		—
1890	670		228.4%
1900	840		25.4%
1910	741		−11.8%
1920	1,014		36.8%
1930	985		−2.9%
1940	802		−18.6%
1950	859		7.1%
1960	832		−3.1%
1970	895		7.6%
1980	932		4.1%
1990	850		−8.8%
2000	827		−2.7%
2010	830		0.4%
2020	857		3.3%
U.S. Decennial Census

=== 2010 census ===
As of the census of 2010, there were 830 people, 359 households, and 228 families living in the city. The population density was 1,276.9 inhabitants per square mile (493.0/km^{2}). There were 396 housing units at an average density of 609.2 per square mile (235.2/km^{2}). The racial makeup of the city was 98.1% White, 0.1% Pacific Islander, 0.2% from other races, and 1.6% from two or more races. Hispanic or Latino of any race were 1.6% of the population.

There were 359 households, of which 28.7% had children under the age of 18 living with them, 51.0% were married couples living together, 7.8% had a female householder with no husband present, 4.7% had a male householder with no wife present, and 36.5% were non-families. 33.4% of all households were made up of individuals, and 18.7% had someone living alone who was 65 years of age or older. The average household size was 2.23 and the average family size was 2.83.

The median age in the city was 45.2 years. 22.2% of residents were under the age of 18; 4.8% were between the ages of 18 and 24; 22.8% were from 25 to 44; 25.5% were from 45 to 64; and 24.7% were 65 years of age or older. The gender makeup of the city was 49.4% male and 50.6% female.

=== 2000 census ===
As of the census of 2000, there were 827 people, 350 households, and 227 families living in the city. The population density was 1,302.2 inhabitants per square mile (502.8/km^{2}). There were 372 housing units at an average density of 585.8 per square mile (226.2/km^{2}). The racial makeup of the city was 99.27% White, 0.12% African American, 0.24% Asian, and 0.36% from two or more races. Hispanic or Latino of any race were 0.97% of the population.

There were 350 households, out of which 27.4% had children under the age of 18 living with them, 52.9% were married couples living together, 8.3% had a female householder with no husband present, and 34.9% were non-families. 31.4% of all households were made up of individuals, and 19.7% had someone living alone who was 65 years of age or older. The average household size was 2.22 and the average family size was 2.77.

In the city, the population was spread out, with 21.9% under the age of 18, 5.8% from 18 to 24, 24.8% from 25 to 44, 21.9% from 45 to 64, and 25.6% who were 65 years of age or older. The median age was 43 years. For every 100 females, there were 80.6 males. For every 100 females age 18 and over, there were 75.5 males.

As of 2000 the median income for a household in the city was $35,515, and the median income for a family was $42,500. Males had a median income of $31,850 versus $19,943 for females. The per capita income for the city was $16,825. About 3.9% of families and 7.1% of the population were below the poverty line, including 6.1% of those under age 18 and 10.4% of those age 65 or over.

== Landmarks ==
Hooper is noted for a 24-foot (7.3 m) obelisk, with the town's name in 18-inch (46 cm) letters, completed in 2010 as a road sign for the town. The tower was constructed alongside a new bypass on U.S. Route 275 that diverted the highway south of the town and raised concerns that the town would be unnoticed by passing traffic.

== Notable people ==
- Lillian Boyer, legendary aerial daredevil, wing walker 1920s
- Jordan Larson, volleyball player at the University of Nebraska–Lincoln; world champion and Olympic gold medalist for the United States women's national volleyball team
- Donald K. Schwab, first lieutenant in the US Army in World War II; awarded Medal of Honor March 18, 2014 for heroism near Lure, France on September 17, 1944
