= Ellis R. Weicht =

United States Army soldier

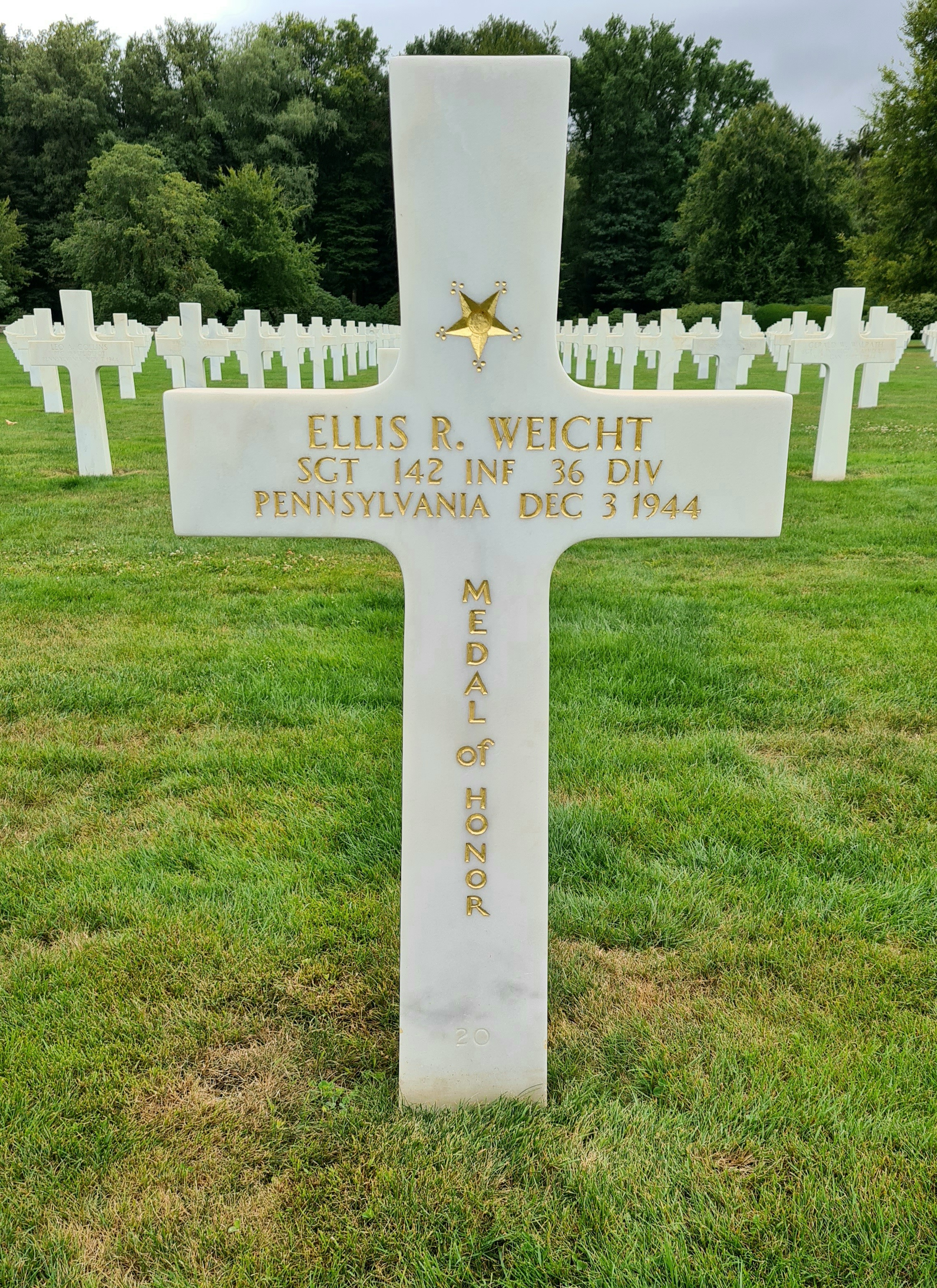
- Born: April 17, 1916; Clearville, Pennsylvania, US
- Died: December 3, 1944 (aged 28); Saint-Hippolyte, France
- Burial place: Epinal American Cemetery and Memorial; Épinal, France
- Military career
- Allegiance: United States
- Branch: United States Army
- Service years: 1942–1944
- Rank: Sergeant
- Units: 142nd Infantry Regiment, 36th Infantry Division
- Conflicts: World War II
- Awards: Medal of Honor; Bronze Star; Purple Heart

Ellis R. Weicht (April 17, 1916 – December 3, 1944) was a United States Army soldier and a recipient of the United States military's highest decoration—the Medal of Honor—for his actions in World War II.

== Career ==
Weicht joined the Army from Bedford, Pennsylvania in February 1942, and by December 3, 1944, was serving as a Sergeant in Company F, 142nd Infantry Regiment, 36th Infantry Division. On that day, during fighting in Saint-Hippolyte, France, he single-handedly attacked two hostile gun emplacements before being killed while attacking an enemy road block. For his actions during the battle, he was posthumously awarded the Medal of Honor seven months later, on July 19, 1945.

Weicht was buried at the Epinal American Cemetery and Memorial in Épinal, France.

== Medal of Honor citation ==
Sergeant Weicht's official Medal of Honor citation reads:

For commanding an assault squad in Company F's attack against the strategically important Alsace town of St. Hippolyte on December 3, 1944. He aggressively led his men down a winding street, clearing the houses of opposition as he advanced. Upon rounding a bend, the group was suddenly brought under the fire of 2 machineguns emplaced in the door and window of a house 100 yards distant. While his squad members took cover, Sgt. Weicht moved rapidly forward to a high rock wall and, fearlessly exposing himself to the enemy action, fired 2 clips of ammunition from his rifle. His fire proving ineffective, he entered a house opposite the enemy gun position, and, firing from a window, killed the 2 hostile gunners. Continuing the attack, the advance was again halted when two 20-mm. guns opened fire on the company. An artillery observer ordered friendly troops to evacuate the area and then directed artillery fire upon the gun positions. Sgt. Weicht remained in the shelled area and continued to fire on the hostile weapons. When the barrage lifted and the enemy soldiers attempted to remove their gun, he killed 2 crewmembers and forced the others to flee. Sgt. Weicht continued to lead his squad forward until he spotted a road block approximate 125 yards away. Moving to the second floor of a nearby house and firing from a window, he killed 3 and wounded several of the enemy. Instantly becoming a target for heavy and direct fire, he disregarded personal safety to continue his fire, with unusual effectiveness, until he was killed by a direct hit from an antitank gun.

== See also ==
- List of Medal of Honor recipients
- List of Medal of Honor recipients for World War II
