= Edmund Wilson Searby =

American World War II army general

- Born: March 7, 1896; Berkeley, California, U.S.
- Died: September 14, 1944 (aged 48); Pont-à-Mousson, France
- Burial place: Epinal American Cemetery, Epinal, Lorraine, France
- Military career
- Service years: 1918–1944
- Rank: Brigadier general
- Unit: 80th Infantry Division
- Conflicts: World War II
- Awards: Silver Star (posthumous); Legion of Merit (posthumous); Purple Heart (posthumous)

Edmund Wilson Searby (March 7, 1896 – September 14, 1944) was an American United States Army officer. He served during World War II as the Division Artillery Commander of the 80th Infantry Division. He lost his life during the battle to liberate the town of Pont-à-Mousson in Meurthe-et-Moselle. At his request, he was interred with the other soldiers who fought in France.

He earned several posthumous awards, including the Silver Star from the American president.

== Biography ==
=== Early life and education ===
Edmund Searby was born on March 7, 1896, in Berkeley, California, to Frederick Wright Searby and Eleanor Porter Searby. He spent his childhood in Sonoma, California, before returning to Berkeley to study law at the University of California. Searby later attended the prestigious United States Military Academy at West Point, graduating in November 1918.

=== Military career ===
Searby’s military career began shortly after his graduation from West Point, where he specialized in field artillery. He first served at the School of Fire for Field Artillery at Fort Sill, Oklahoma, and later at Camp Zachary Taylor, Kentucky, for the Field Artillery Basic School. Searby’s early assignments included service in Germany with the 6th Field Artillery and training at the L'École d'Artillerie in Fontainebleau, France, between December 1920 and August 1921.

In 1924, he became a mathematics instructor at the U.S. Military Academy, later advancing through various artillery and cavalry schools. In 1926, he volunteered for flying school and later served as an instructor in the Animal Transport and Gunnery Department at the Field Artillery School at Fort Sill.

By 1940, Searby had risen to the rank of major, and by 1942, he was promoted to lieutenant colonel. In February 1943, he was promoted to brigadier general and was assigned to command the 80th Division Artillery. He played a pivotal role in preparing the division for the Allied invasion of France.

=== World War II: liberation of France and death ===
Searby’s most significant military actions came during the invasion of Normandy in 1944. He landed on Utah Beach in France on August 2, 1944, and participated in the liberation of several French towns, including Châlons-en-Champagne on August 28 and Condé-sur-Marne on August 29.

Searby’s leadership was integral to the success of these operations, and he became a hero in the region. His actions helped inspire troops during the battles that led to the liberation of other towns like Commercy and Atton.

On September 11, he encountered strong German resistance at Atton, at the foot of the Mousson hill in Meurthe-et-Moselle. This hill was vital as an artillery observation post and the key to the 80th Division's crossing of the Moselle. On September 14, after heavy fighting, it was taken at around 1:50 pm, but the position was not consolidated. At 9:30 pm, the Germans counter-attacked. Searby accompanied the infantrymen in the attack. As Division Artillery Commander, Searby was in the front lines, directing artillery fire to destroy enemy positions. Acting as a forward observer, he directed the artillery fire that surprised the German forces and resulted in the complete destruction of two enemy artillery batteries. Before the Americans could consolidate their positions, the Nazis counter-attacked in force, supported by a powerful concentration of artillery and mortar fire. A shell stopped a German tank that had emerged some 130 m from Searby. Disregarding his own safety, Searby took the rifle of a wounded soldier and opened fire on the tank crew, who were spraying the American soldiers with automatic weapons fire. Searby was killed in the exchange of fire.

== Posthumous awards ==
Searby’s bravery and leadership earned him several posthumous awards, including the Silver Star from the President of the United States, Legion of Merit, and Purple Heart. He was buried initially in a temporary grave near Toul, France, and later reinterred at the Epinal American Cemetery in Epinal, Lorraine, France.

A memorial plaque was dedicated to him in Condé-sur-Marne during the 70th anniversary of its liberation in 2014, commemorating his leadership in the liberation of the town and surrounding areas. There are also other memorials of him in France.

=== Awards and decorations ===
- Silver Star (Posthumous)
- Legion of Merit (Posthumous)
- Purple Heart (Posthumous)

== See also ==
- List of U.S. general officers and flag officers killed in World War II
