= Gus Kefurt =

Gus J. Kefurt
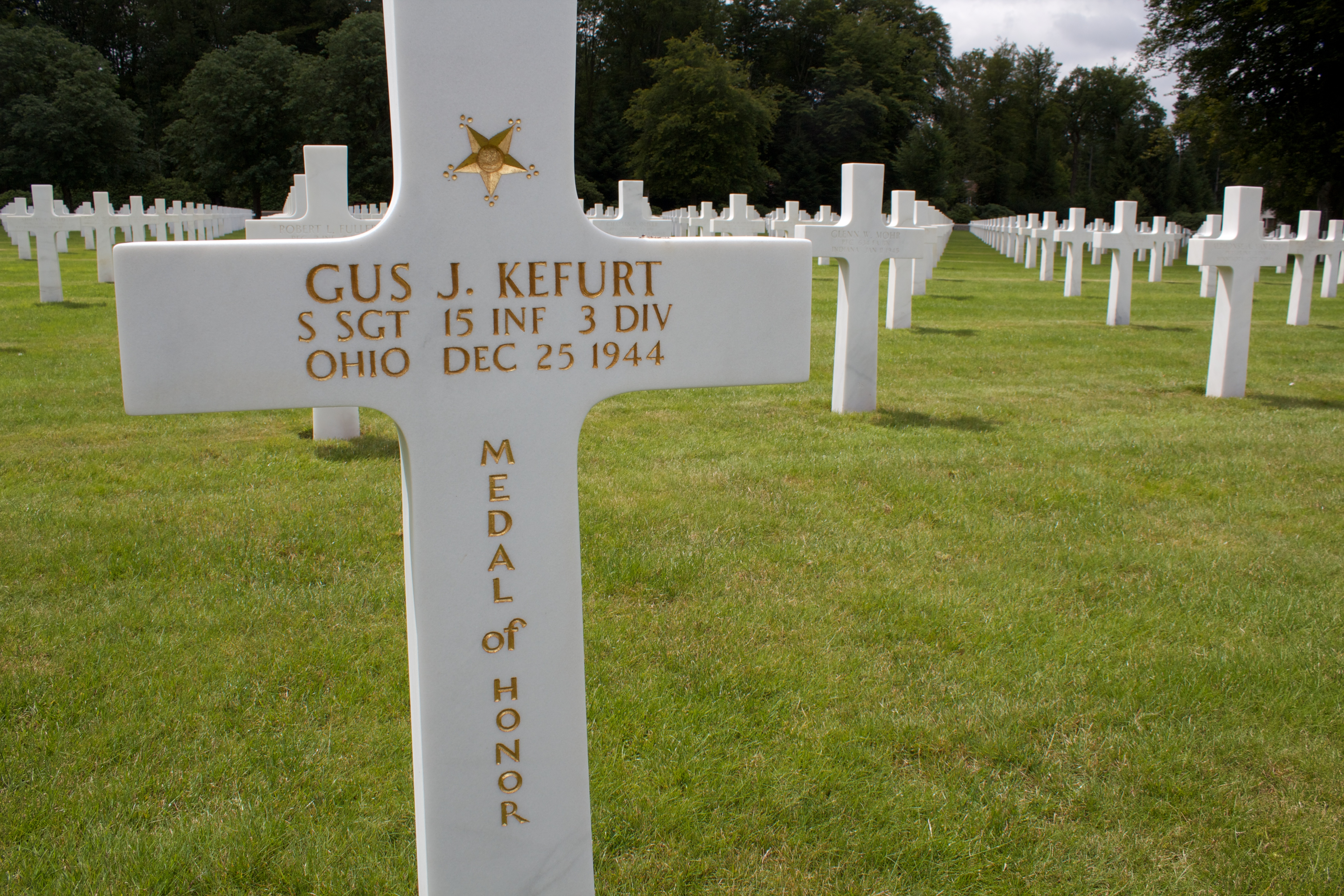
- Gravestone of Gus Kefurt
- Born: October 31, 1917; Greenville, Pennsylvania, U.S.
- Died: December 25, 1944 (aged 27) near Bennwihr, France
- Burial place: Epinal American Cemetery and Memorial, Épinal, France
- Military career
- Allegiance: United States
- Branch: United States Army
- Service years: 1943–1944
- Rank: Staff Sergeant
- Units: 15th Infantry Regiment, 3rd Infantry Division
- Conflicts: World War II
- Awards: Medal of Honor; Silver Star; Purple Heart

Gus J. Kefurt (October 31, 1917 – December 25, 1944) was a United States Army soldier and a recipient of the United States military's highest decoration—the Medal of Honor—for his actions in World War II.

Kefurt joined the Army from Youngstown, Ohio in August 1943, and by December 23, 1944, was serving as a staff sergeant in Company K, 15th Infantry Regiment, 3rd Infantry Division. On that day and the next, he led his men in a fight against German forces near Bennwihr, France. He exposed himself to hostile fire in order to encourage his men and direct their fire, led his men in the defense of positions despite repeated enemy attacks, and refused medical evacuation even after being seriously wounded. He was killed on December 25, and posthumously awarded the Medal of Honor in 1948 for his actions during the battle.

Kefurt was buried at the Epinal American Cemetery and Memorial in Épinal, France.

Upon re-stationing to Fort Benning in 1996, 3rd Brigade – 3rd Infantry Division designated building 9001 on Kelley Hill as the Kefurt Fitness Center.

== Medal of Honor citation ==
Staff Sergeant Kefurt's official Medal of Honor citation reads:

He distinguished himself by conspicuous gallantry and intrepidity above and beyond the call of duty on 23 and 24 December 1944, near Bennwihr, France. Early in the attack S/Sgt. Kefurt jumped through an opening in a wall to be confronted by about 15 Germans. Although outnumbered he opened fire, killing 10 and capturing the others. During a seesaw battle which developed he effectively adjusted artillery fire on an enemy tank close to his position although exposed to small arms fire. When night fell he maintained a 3-man outpost in the center of the town in the middle of the German positions and successfully fought off several hostile patrols attempting to penetrate our lines. Assuming command of his platoon the following morning he led it in hand-to-hand fighting through the town until blocked by a tank. Using rifle grenades he forced surrender of its crew and some supporting infantry. He then continued his attack from house to house against heavy machinegun and rifle fire. Advancing against a strongpoint that was holding up the company, his platoon was subjected to a strong counterattack and infiltration to its rear. Suffering heavy casualties in their exposed position the men remained there due to S/Sgt. Kefurt's personal example of bravery, determination and leadership. He constantly exposed himself to fire by going from man to man to direct fire. During this time he killed approximately 15 of the enemy at close range. Although severely wounded in the leg he refused first aid and immediately resumed fighting. When the forces to his rear were pushed back 3 hours later, he refused to be evacuated, but, during several more counterattacks moved painfully about under intense small arms and mortar fire, stiffening the resistance of his platoon by encouraging individual men and by his own fire until he was killed. As a result of S/Sgt. Kefurt's gallantry the position was maintained.

== Awards and decorations ==

Badge	Combat Infantryman Badge		
1st row	Medal of Honor		Silver Star
2nd row	Bronze Star Medal	Purple Heart with oak leaf cluster	Army Good Conduct Medal
3rd row	American Campaign Medal	European–African–Middle Eastern Campaign Medal with one campaign star	World War II Victory Medal

== See also ==
- List of Medal of Honor recipients
- List of Medal of Honor recipients for World War II
