= Richard G. Stilwell =

American army general (1917–1991)

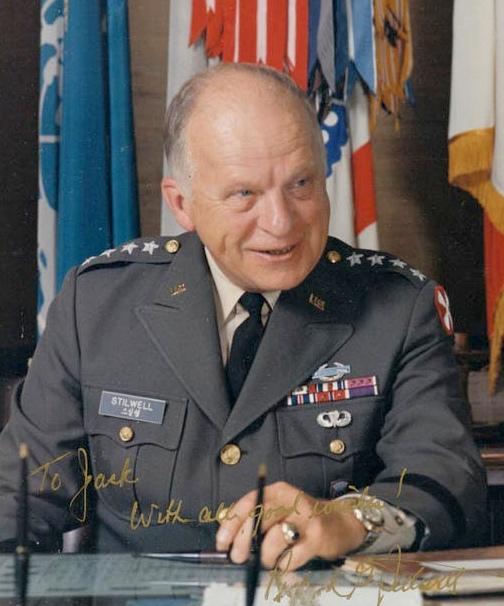
- General Stilwell in the 1970s
- Born: 24 February 1917; Buffalo, New York, U.S.
- Died: 25 December 1991 (aged 74); Falls Church, Virginia, U.S.
- Military career
- Allegiance: United States of America
- Branch: United States Army
- Service years: 1938–1976
- Rank: General
- Commands: United States Forces Korea; Sixth United States Army; XXIV Corps; 1st Armored Division; 15th Infantry Regiment
- Conflicts: World War II; Korean War; Vietnam War
- Awards: Defense Distinguished Service Medal; Distinguished Service Medal (4); Silver Star (2); Legion of Merit (4); Distinguished Flying Cross; Bronze Star Medal (3); Purple Heart

Richard Giles Stilwell (24 February 1917 – 25 December 1991) was a United States Army general who served as Commander United States Forces Korea from 1973 to 1976, and acting Commander of the U.S. Army Pacific from September to December 1974. He was not closely related to General Joseph W. Stilwell.

== Early life and education ==
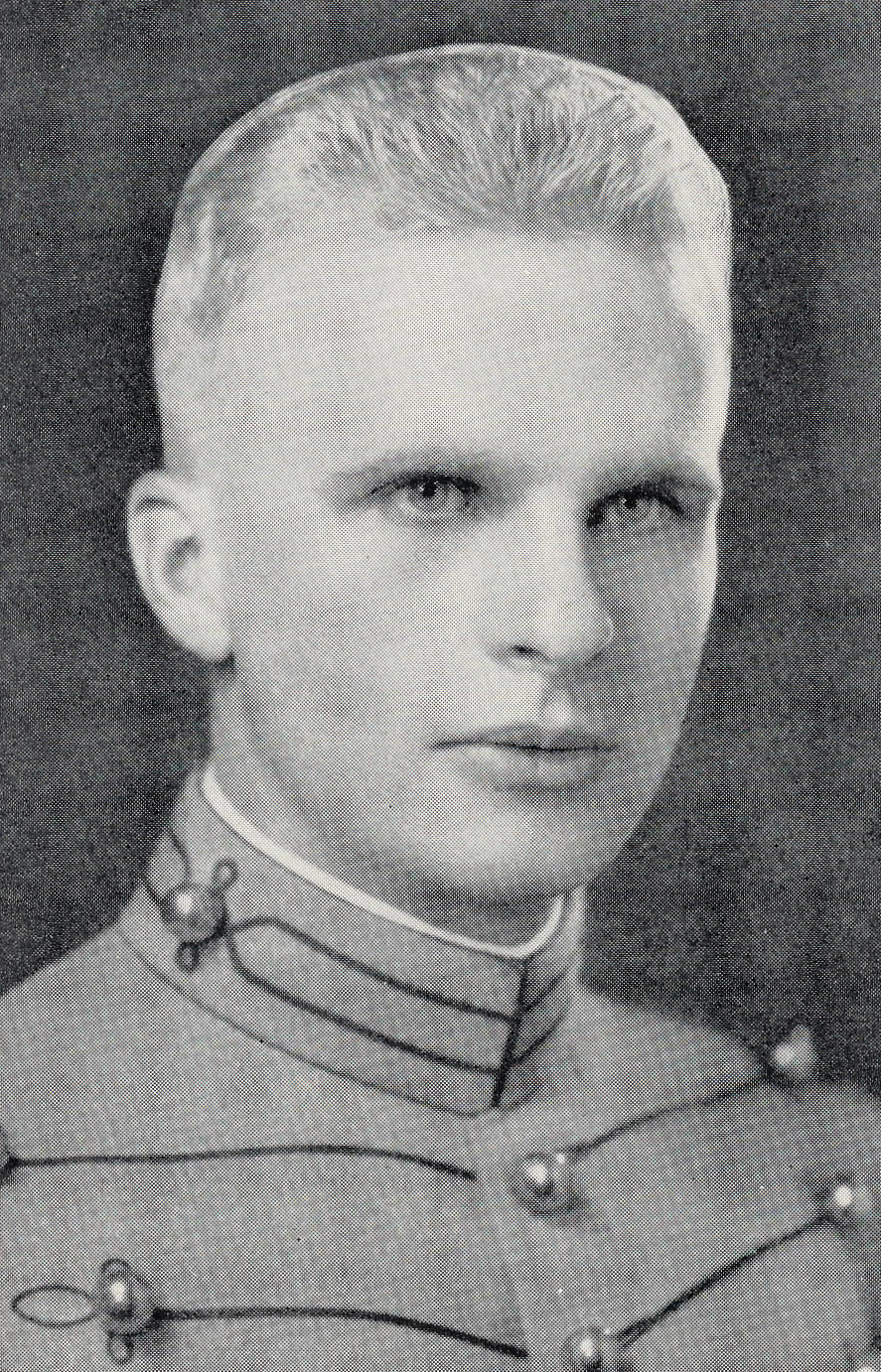
Stilwell as a United States Military Academy cadet c. 1938

Born in Buffalo, New York, in 1917, Stilwell attended Brown University before graduating from the United States Military Academy in 1938 with a commission into the Corps of Engineers. He subsequently attended the U.S. Army War College.

== Career ==
During World War II, Stilwell participated in the Normandy invasion, and briefly served under General George S. Patton immediately after the war during the occupation of Europe. From there he was a special military advisor to the U.S. Embassy in Rome before serving in the Central Intelligence Agency.

During the Korean War, Stilwell commanded the 15th Infantry Regiment, and was a senior advisor to the I Republic of Korea (ROK) Army Corps.

As a brigadier general, Stilwell was Commandant of Cadets at the U.S. Military Academy at West Point, N.Y. while General William Westmoreland was Superintendent during the early 1960s.

Stilwell served as commander of the U.S. Military Assistance Command, Thailand (MACTHAI) from 1965 to 1967. From there he commanded the 1st Armored Division at Fort Hood, Texas, from 1967 to 1968.

During the Vietnam War Westmoreland appointed Stilwell as his chief of staff. He served as deputy commanding general, III Marine Amphibious Force in South Vietnam during 1968 and then as commander of XXIV Corps from 1968 to 1969.

On his return to the US he served as deputy chief of staff for US military operations at the Pentagon under Army Chief of Staff Westmoreland from 1969 to 1972. Stilwell later served as the commanding general of the Sixth United States Army, at the Presidio from 1972 to 1973, followed by commander-in-chief of the United Nations Command in Korea. Stilwell oversaw Operation Paul Bunyan to remove a tree in the DMZ. He retired in 1976, with the rank of general.

== Later life and death ==
After retiring from the Army, Stilwell served as U.S. Deputy Undersecretary of Defense for Policy from 1981 to 1985. He died on 25 December 1991, of cardiac arrest, at the age of 74. He was buried at West Point Cemetery, in West Point, New York.

== Awards and decorations ==
His awards and deocrations decorations includes:

Combat Infantryman Badge
Parachutist Badge
Defense Distinguished Service Medal
Army Distinguished Service Medal with three bronze oak leaf clusters
Silver Star with a bronze oak leaf cluster
Legion of Merit with two bronze oak leaf clusters
Distinguished Flying Cross
Bronze Star Medal with two bronze oak leaf clusters
Purple Heart
Air Medal with award numeral 30
Joint Service Commendation Medal
Army Commendation Medal with a bronze oak leaf cluster
Navy Commendation Medal with "V" Device
American Defense Service Medal with one bronze service star
American Campaign Medal
European–African–Middle Eastern Campaign Medal with one silver service star and an arrowhead
World War II Victory Medal
Army of Occupation Medal with "Germany" clasp
Armed Forces Expeditionary Medal
National Defense Service Medal with service star
Korean Service Medal with three bronze service stars
Vietnam Service Medal with seven service stars
Army Presidential Unit Citation
Army Meritorious Unit Commendation

Foreign decorations and awards

His foreign awards and decorations include:

Order of the Patriotic War First Class (Soviet Union)
Officer of the Order of the Leopold
Croix de Guerre with bronze palm (France)
Croix de Guerre with palm (Belgium)
Croix de Guerre (Luxembourg)
Order of Military Merit, Eulji Medal (South Korea)
Military Order of the White Lion, Third Class (Czechoslovakia)
War Cross (Greece)
Military Order of Italy, Commander (Italy)
National Order of Vietnam, Commander
Vietnam Army Distinguished Service Order, 1st class
Vietnam Gallantry Cross with palm
Republic of Vietnam Chuong My Medal, First Class
Presidential Unit Citation (South Korea)
Korean War Service Medal (South Korea)
United Nations Korea Medal (United Nations)
Vietnam Campaign Medal
