= Francis X. Burke =

American politician (1862 or 1866–1933)

Francis Xavier Burke (October 23, 1862 or 1866 – February 2, 1933) was an American politician who served as a Democratic member of the Michigan House of Representatives from 1913 to 1914.

== Biography ==
Burke was born on October 23, 1862 or 1866, in Ecorse Township, Michigan, to Casper and Catherine M. Burke (née Riopelle). His mother's family came from France with Antoine de la Mothe Cadillac in 1701, and his father was of German descent. He served as postmaster of River Rouge and justice for peace of Escorse Township. He and his brother H. C. Burke were founders of River Rouge Savings Bank.

Burke was elected to the Michigan House of Representatives on November 5, 1912, being sworn in on January 1, 1913, and leaving office in 1914. He died on February 2, 1933, of appendicitis.
