= Baker Boys: Inside the Surge =

2010 American TV war documentary

- Genre: War
- Written by: Derek Boonstra; Davon Ramos; Jon Steele
- Directed by: Kern Konwiser
- Starring: Baker Company Task Force 1-15 IN 3d HBCT - 3d ID
- Theme music composer: Jordan Innis
- Country of origin: United States
- Original language: English
- No. of episodes: 4

Production
- Executive producers: David Pritchard; Cal Boyington; Vincent Gonet; David Rihs
- Producers: Kip Konwiser; Afnan Steele; Jon Steele
- Editors: Davon Ramos; Derek Boonstra
- Running time: 231 minutes

Original release
- Network: HDNet
- Release: January 4 – January 25, 2010

Baker Boys: Inside the Surge, is a 2010 four-part documentary series following the soldiers of Baker Company, Task Force 1-15 Infantry, 3d Heavy Brigade Combat Team, 3rd Infantry Division, during their deployment in Operation Iraqi Freedom at Combat Outpost Carver during the troop surge of 2007.

== Overview ==
The series provides an intimate view of counter-insurgency and soldiers on the front lines during the surge of coalition troops in Iraq. Beginning in February 2008, journalist Jon Steele embedded with Baker Company. Over the course of 90 days, he conducted interviews with its soldiers, filmed their activities, and gathered footage from ground and air combat missions.

This 4-part miniseries was directed by two-time Emmy Award winner Kern Konwiser and presented in association with Gigapix Studios, PointProd, and Sandbag Productions.

== Premieres ==
Baker Boys: Inside the Surge was first aired in January 2010. Beginning on Jan. 4, HDNet aired it in four one-hour segments every Monday. The series was released for screening on April 23, 2010, at the Newport Beach Film Festival. On January 4, 2011, Baker Boys was released on DVD, initially exclusively through the Army and Air Force Exchange Service (AAFES). On Jan. 19 and 20, 2011, the National Infantry Museum's IMAX theater screened it for the Fort Benning community, home of the 1-15 Infantry.

== Awards ==
Baker Boys: Inside the Surge has won awards at every festival in which it has been played, including:

Award	Festival	Year	Note
Audience Award Winner	11th Annual Newport Beach Film Festival	2010	
Award Of Excellence	Accolade Competition	2010	
Silver Remi Winner	43rd Annual WorldFest-Houston International Film Festival	2010	
Bronze Winner	31st Annual Telly Awards	2010	
Honorable Mention	Dart Awards for Excellence in Journalism	2010	
Genius Audience Award	20th Annual Gotham Awards' Festival	2010	
Best Documentary Feature	7th Annual Ventura Film Festival	2010	
Special Jury Award, Telecast Series	55th Annual CINE film and video competition	2011	
