= Dinozé =

- Commune
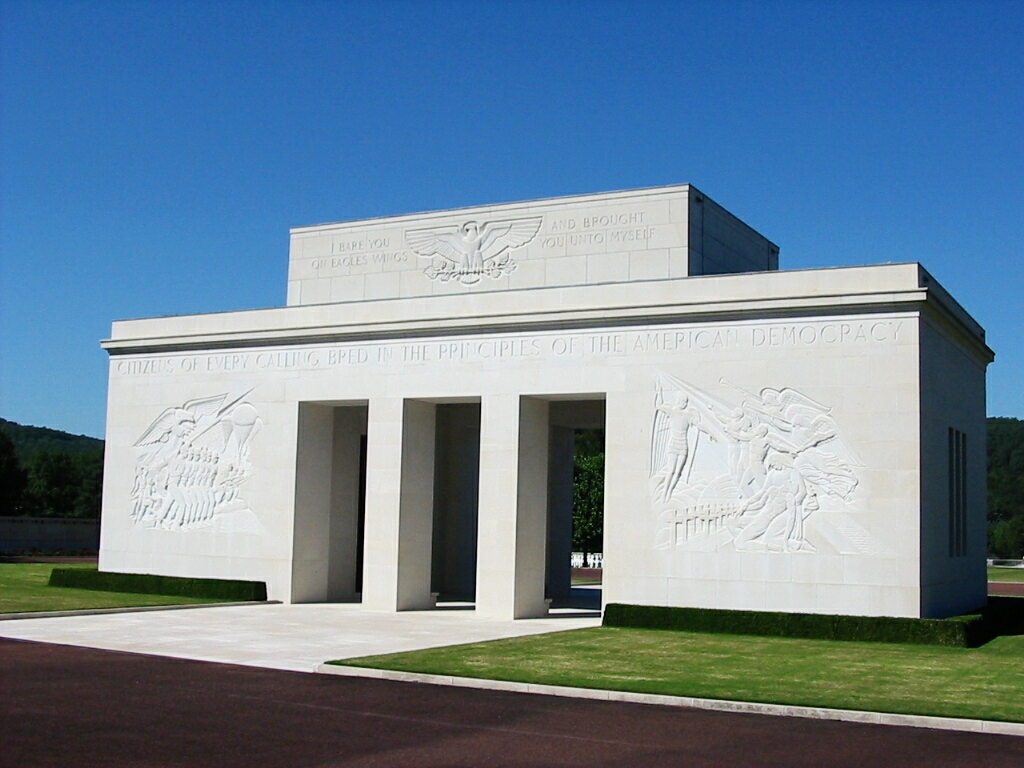
- American military memorial

- Coat of arms
- Location of Dinozé
- Location within France Location within Grand Est
- Coordinates: 48°08′28″N 6°28′38″E
- Country: France
- Region: Grand Est
- Department: Vosges
- Arrondissement: Épinal
- Canton: Épinal-1
- Intercommunality: CA Épinal

Government
  - Mayor (2021–2026): Wilfrid Grandmaire
- Area^{1}: 2.89 km^{2} (1.12 sq mi)
- Highest elevation: 477 m (1,565 ft)
- Lowest elevation: 328 m (1,076 ft)
- Population (2023): 648
  - Density: 224/km^{2} (581/sq mi)
- Time zone: UTC+01:00 (CET)
  - Summer (DST): UTC+02:00 (CEST)
- INSEE/Postal code: 88134 /88000
- ^{1} French Land Register data, which excludes lakes, ponds, glaciers > 1 km^{2} (0.386 sq mi or 247 acres) and river estuaries.

Dinozé (French pronunciation: [dinoze]) is a commune in the Vosges department in Grand Est in northeastern France. The commune is located on the left bank of the Moselle, six miles upstream of Epinal. It is dominated by green hills and the Rainjuménil woods.

The commune of Dinozé was established in March 1932. The village had been previously part of Arches.

== See also ==
- Communes of the Vosges department
