= Messerschmidt =

Messerschmidt or Messerschmitt is an occupational surname of German origin, which means cutler or knifemaker, from the Middle High German words mezzer "knife" + smit "smith". It may refer to:

- Alfons Messerschmitt (1943–2022), German sport shooter
- Daniel Gottlieb Messerschmidt (1685–1735), German physician
- David Messerschmitt (born 1945), American electrical engineer
- Erik Messerschmidt (born 1980), American cinematographer
- Franz Xaver Messerschmidt (1736–1783), Austrian sculptor
- Harold O. Messerschmidt (1923–1944), American soldier
- Jana Messerschmidt (born 1990), German karateka
- Manfred Messerschmidt (1926–2022), German historian
- Morten Messerschmidt (born 1980), Danish politician
- Nadine Messerschmidt (born 1993), German sport shooter
- Pius Ferdinand Messerschmitt (1858–1915), German painter
- Rasmus Messerschmidt (born 1992), Danish badminton player
- Uwe Messerschmidt (born 1962), German cyclist
- Willy Messerschmitt (1898–1978), German aircraft designer

== See also ==
- Messerschmitt, a German aircraft manufacturer
