= John Butler Tytus =

- Born: John Butler Tytus Jr. December 6, 1875; Middletown, Ohio, U.S.
- Died: June 2, 1944 (aged 68)
- Education: Yale University

John Butler Tytus Jr. (December 6, 1875 – June 2, 1944) was the inventor of the first practical wide-strip continuous rolling process for manufacturing steel. This process greatly reduced the cost of manufacturing steel, and was first implemented in a new Armco plant in 1924. By 1940, twenty-six plants had been built. He was a Yale University graduate but learned the steel business from the ground up. His home in Middletown, Ohio, the John B. Tytus House, was declared a National Historic Landmark in 1976.

== Biography ==
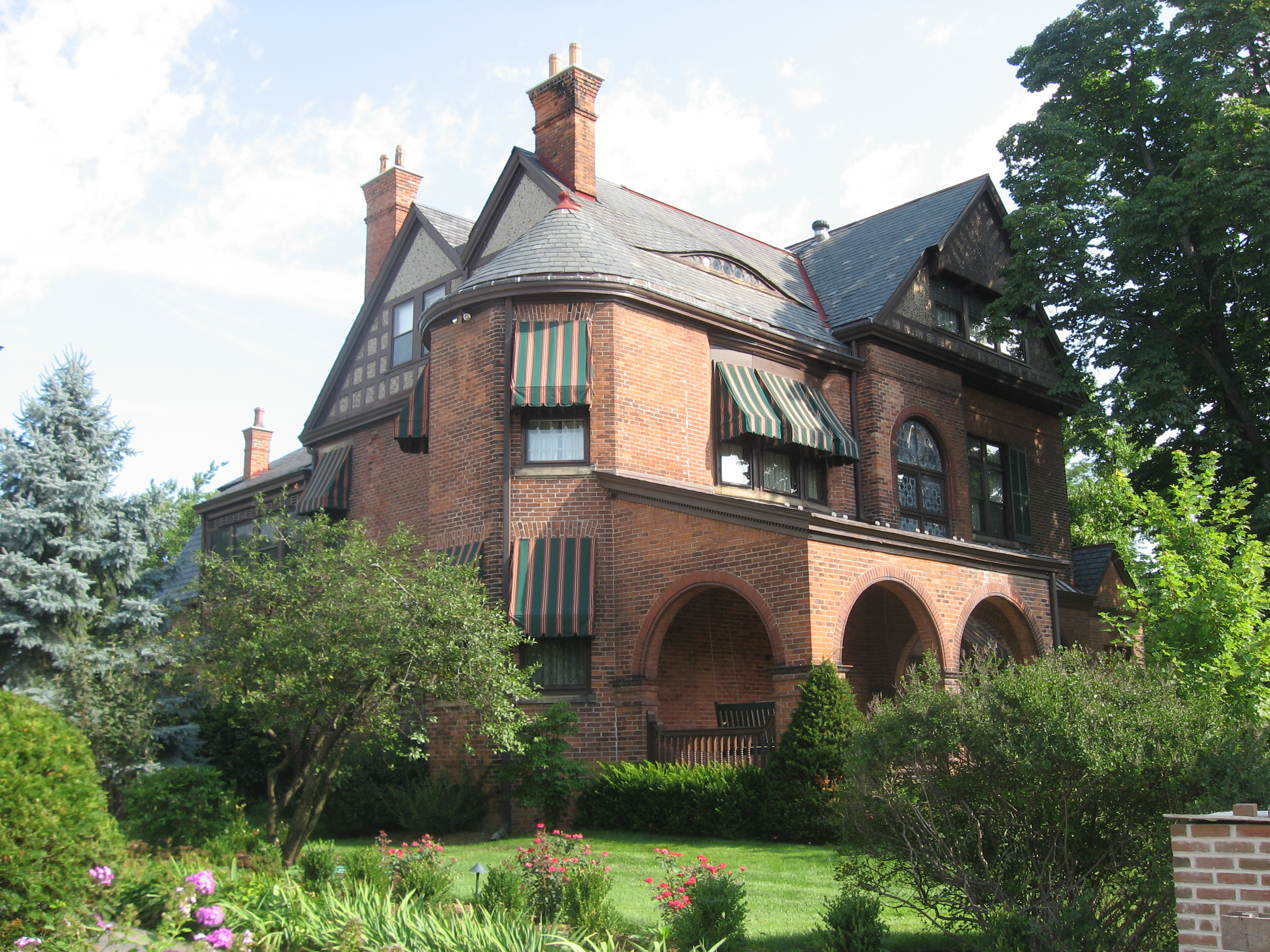
Tytus' house in Middletown

John B. Tytus was born in Middletown, Ohio, on December 6, 1875. His father owned a paper mill, which Tytus found fascinating as child. He attended the common schools until age fourteen. He then attended Westminster prep school at Dobbs Ferry, New York, which prepared him for admission to Yale University. He graduated from Yale in 1897 with a bachelor's degree in English literature and returned to Middletown to work in the family paper mill. Soon afterward, his father died and his family sold the mill. He went to work with a bridge builder at Dayton, Ohio.

In 1904 he left the bridge builder to work for a steel mill in his hometown as a spare hand. He quickly learned about steel rolling and earned the respect of his coworkers. He always remembered the way the Fourdrinier machines produced paper rolls, and began to consider ways in which the process of steel rolling could be made more efficient. After eighteen months, he became the assistant of the sheet mill superintendent, Charlie Hook. During this time and afterwards, Tytus continued to research and think about improving steel rolling. In 1906 he was promoted to superintendent of the new mill in Zanesville, Ohio. The following year, he married Marjorie Denny. At the end of 1909, he was chosen to plan and activate Armco's East Works plant at Middletown as chief of operations.

In 1919 he had readied blueprints for a new plant incorporating techniques for continuous steel rolling, but the opportunity to put these plans into practice did not arise until 1921. He presented his plans and Armco made the difficult decision to implement them. The continuous rolling steel mill he designed and built began operation in Ashland in 1924 and became a model for the industry. In 1927 Tytus was made vice-president of Armco, and in 1935 he received the Gary Memorial Award from the American Iron and Steel Institute. He died of a heart attack on June 2, 1944.

In 2012 Tytus was inducted into the American Metal Market Steel Hall of Fame, Class of 2012 for his invention of the first workable wide-strip continuous rolling process for making steel.
