= Butler County Warbirds =

- Location within Ohio
- Established: 2000
- Founders: Sandra Arany; Timothy Epperhart; Jean Lail; Roger Palmer; William Palmer
- Type: Nonprofit
- Coordinates: 39.5335°N 84.3850°W
- Website: www.bcwarbirds.com

The Butler County Warbirds is a non-profit organization located at the Middletown Regional Airport in Middletown, Ohio focused on military aviation history.

== History ==
The Butler County Warbirds was founded in 2000 by Sandra Arany, Timothy Epperhart, Jean Lail, Roger Palmer and William Palmer. Originally based at the Butler County Regional Airport, after 11 years, the group moved to and opened a museum in the 1938 City Hangar at the Middletown Regional Airport in Middletown, Ohio. The organization's facility is located in the National Aviation Heritage Area and is adjacent to the site of the Aeronca Aircraft factory. Butler County Warbirds is also part of the Aviation Trail.

The organization began raising funds to purchase a North American AT-6 Texan in October 2022. Plans call for the profits from rides sold in the airplane to go to an aviation scholarship for women.

== Exhibits ==
Their facility inside the 1938 City Hangar includes a 2,100 sq ft (200 m^{2}) artifact display which houses over 2,800 artifacts from the American Civil War to present day, with a bulk of the collection being from World War II. The display includes an interior recreation of a Nissen hut complete with an officer's bar.

== Collection ==
- Aeronca L-3E Defender
- Fairchild PT-19 Cornell
- Fairchild XUC-86A
- Grumman American AA-5
- Aeronca L-16 Grasshopper
- Stearman N2S-1

== Programs ==
The organization offers rides in four of its aircraft. It also provides a Vintage Cadet Experience, in which participants take part in a recreation of World War II flight training. It offers photo packages with it's aircraft.

The group also organizes or participates in many local events. They put on two free annual community events: "The Candy Bomber", which is a recreation celebrating the pilots of the Berlin Airlift who dropped candy from aircraft to the children of the city of Berlin. "Cookies with Santa", a celebration of the holiday season with Santa and his elves passing out gifts, cookies and hot chocolate the kids.

== See also ==
- Tri-State Warbird Museum
