= Eric G. Gibson =

United States WWII soldier (1919–1944)

Eric Gunnar Gibson
- Born: October 3, 1919; Nysund, Sweden
- Died: January 28, 1944 (aged 24) near Isolabella, Cisterna di Latina Italy
- Burial place: Nora Cemetery, Rice Lake, Wisconsin
- Military career
- Allegiance: United States of America
- Branch: United States Army
- Service years: 1941–1944
- Rank: Technician Fifth Grade
- Units: 30th Infantry Regiment, 3rd Infantry Division
- Conflicts: World War II
- Awards: Medal of Honor

Eric Gunnar Gibson (October 3, 1919 – January 28, 1944) was a United States Army soldier and a recipient of the United States military's highest decoration—the Medal of Honor—for his actions in World War II.

== Biography ==
Born in Sweden, Gibson immigrated to the United States and joined the Army from Chicago, Illinois in February 1941. By January 28, 1944, he was a technician fifth grade serving as a cook in the 30th Infantry Regiment, 3rd Infantry Division. On that day, in Cisterna di Latina area near Isolabella, Italy, he was placed in command of a squad during an advance down a streambed. Gibson led his men from the front, repeatedly advancing ahead of the squad and three times attacking German positions alone. He was killed while charging a fourth German position. For these actions, he was posthumously awarded the Medal of Honor eight months later, on September 11, 1944.

Gibson, aged 24 at his death, was buried in Nora Cemetery, Rice Lake, Wisconsin. His parents had moved to Rice Lake while Gibson was serving in Europe.

== Medal of Honor citation ==
Technician Fifth Grade Gibson's official Medal of Honor citation reads:

For conspicuous gallantry and intrepidity at risk of life above and beyond the call of duty. On January 28, 1944, near Isolabella, Italy, Tech. 5th Grade Gibson, company cook, led a squad of replacements through their initial baptism of fire, destroyed four enemy positions, killed 5 and captured 2 German soldiers, and secured the left flank of his company during an attack on a strongpoint. Placing himself 50 yards in front of his new men, Gibson advanced down the wide stream ditch known as the Fosso Femminamorta, keeping pace with the advance of his company. An enemy soldier allowed Tech. 5th Grade Gibson to come within 20 yards of his concealed position and then opened fire on him with a machine pistol. Despite the stream of automatic fire which barely missed him, Gibson charged the position, firing his submachine gun every few steps. Reaching the position, Gibson fired pointblank at his opponent, killing him. An artillery concentration fell in and around the ditch; the concussion from one shell knocked him flat. As he got to his feet Gibson was fired on by two soldiers armed with a machine pistol and a rifle from a position only 75 yards distant. Gibson immediately raced toward the foe. Halfway to the position a machinegun opened fire on him. Bullets came within inches of his body, yet Gibson never paused in his forward movement. He killed one and captured the other soldier. Shortly after, when he was fired upon by a heavy machinegun 200 yards down the ditch, Gibson crawled back to his squad and ordered it to lay down a base of fire while he flanked the emplacement. Despite all warning, Gibson crawled 125 yards through an artillery concentration and the cross fire of 2 machineguns which showered dirt over his body, threw 2 hand grenades into the emplacement and charged it with his submachine gun, killing 2 of the enemy and capturing a third. Before leading his men around a bend in the stream ditch, Gibson went forward alone to reconnoiter. Hearing an exchange of machine pistol and submachine gun fire, Gibson's squad went forward to find that its leader had run 35 yards toward an outpost, killed the machine pistol man, and had himself been killed while firing at the Germans.

== Awards and decorations ==

1st row	Medal of Honor		
2nd row	Purple Heart	Army Good Conduct Medal	American Defense Service Medal
3rd row	American Campaign Medal	European–African–Middle Eastern Campaign Medal with 1 campaign star	World War II Victory Medal

== See also ==
- List of Medal of Honor recipients for World War II
