= Patrick L. Kessler =

- Born: March 17, 1922; Middletown, Ohio, U.S.
- Died: May 25, 1944 (aged 22); Ponte Rotto, Italy
- Burial place: Woodside Cemetery, Middletown, Ohio
- Military career
- Allegiance: United States of America
- Branch: United States Army
- Service years: 1942 - 1944
- Rank: Private First Class
- Units: 30th Infantry Regiment, 3rd Infantry Division
- Conflicts: World War II †
- Awards: Medal of Honor

Patrick L. Kessler (March 17, 1922 – May 25, 1944) was a United States Army soldier and a recipient of the United States military's highest decoration—the Medal of Honor—for his actions in World War II.

== Biography ==
Kessler joined the Army from his birthplace of Middletown, Ohio in September 1942, and by May 23, 1944, was serving as a private first class in Company K, 30th Infantry Regiment, 3rd Infantry Division. On that day, near Ponte Rotto, Italy, he single-handedly charged two German positions, a machine gun nest and a strongpoint, and captured sixteen German soldiers, including two snipers. Kessler was killed in action two days later and, on January 4, 1945, posthumously awarded the Medal of Honor for his actions near Ponte Rotto.

Kessler, aged 22 at his death, was buried at Woodside Cemetery in his hometown of Middletown, Ohio.

== Medal of Honor citation ==
Private First Class Kessler's official Medal of Honor citation reads:

For conspicuous gallantry and intrepidity at risk of life above and beyond the call of duty. Pfc. Kessler, acting without orders, raced 50 yards (46 m) through a hail of machinegun fire, which had killed 5 of his comrades and halted the advance of his company, in order to form an assault group to destroy the machinegun. Ordering 3 men to act as a base of fire, he left the cover of a ditch and snaked his way to a point within 50 yards (46 m) of the enemy machinegun before he was discovered, whereupon he plunged headlong into the furious chain of automatic fire. Reaching a spot within 6 feet (1.8 m) of the emplacement he stood over it and killed both the gunner and his assistant, jumped into the gun position, overpowered and captured a third German after a short struggle. The remaining member of the crew escaped, but Pfc. Kessler wounded him as he ran. While taking his prisoner to the rear, this soldier saw 2 of his comrades killed as they assaulted an enemy strongpoint, fire from which had already killed 10 men in the company. Turning his prisoner over to another man, Pfc. Kessler crawled 35 yards (32 m) to the side of 1 of the casualties, relieved him of his BAR and ammunition and continued on toward the strongpoint, 125 yards (114 m) distant. Although 2 machineguns concentrated their fire directly on him and shells exploded within 10 yards (9.1 m), bowling him over, Pfc. Kessler crawled 75 yards (69 m), passing through an antipersonnel minefield to a point within 50 yards (46 m) of the enemy and engaged the machineguns in a duel. When an artillery shell burst within a few feet of him, he left the cover of a ditch and advanced upon the position in a slow walk, firing his BAR from the hip. Although the enemy poured heavy machinegun and small arms fire at him, Pfc. Kessler succeeded in reaching the edge of their position, killed the gunners, and captured 13 Germans. Then, despite continuous shelling, he started to the rear. After going 25 yards (23 m), Pfc. Kessler was fired upon by 2 snipers only 100 yards (91 m) away. Several of his prisoners took advantage of this opportunity and attempted to escape; however, Pfc. Kessler hit the ground, fired on either flank of his prisoners, forcing them to cover, and then engaged the 2 snipers in a fire fight, and captured them. With this last threat removed, Company K continued its advance, capturing its objective without further opposition. Pfc. Kessler was killed in a subsequent action.

== Awards and decorations ==

Badge	Combat Infantryman Badge		
1st row	Medal of Honor		
2nd row	Bronze Star Medal	Purple Heart	Army Good Conduct Medal
3rd row	American Campaign Medal	European–African–Middle Eastern Campaign Medal with one campaign star	World War II Victory Medal

== See also ==
- List of Medal of Honor recipients
- List of Medal of Honor recipients for World War II
