= John B. Tytus House =

Historic house in Ohio, United States

- U.S. National Register of Historic Places
- U.S. National Historic Landmark
- U.S. Historic district – Contributing property
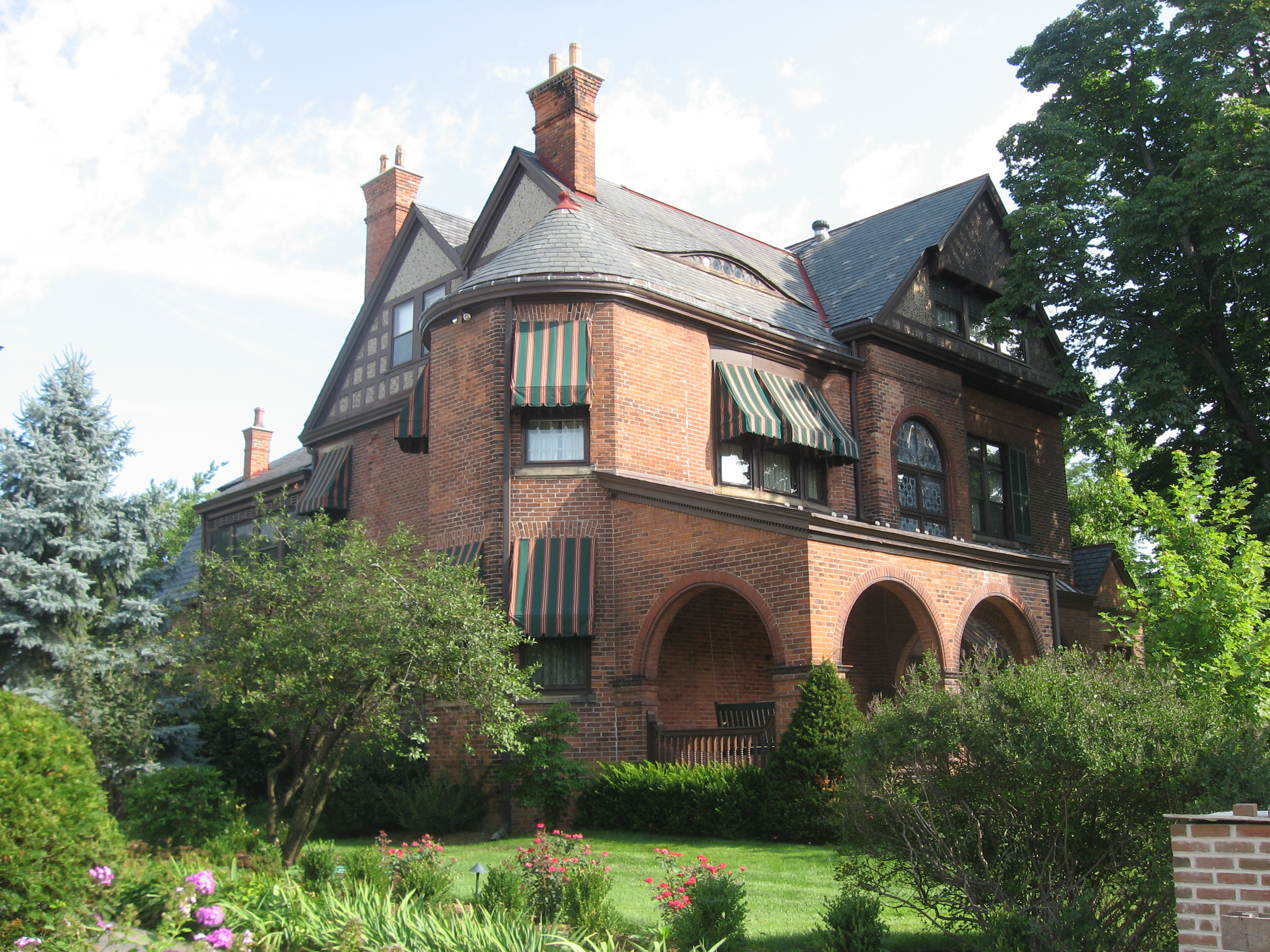
- Front and southern side of the house

- Location within Ohio Location within the United States
- Location: 300 South Main Street, Middletown, Ohio, United States
- Coordinates: 39°30′46.4″N 84°24′32″W
- Area: 1 acre (0.40 ha)
- Architectural style: Romanesque and Tudorbethan architecture
- Part of: South Main Street District (ID78002015)
- NRHP reference No.: 75001335

Significant dates
- Added to NRHP: May 27, 1975
- Designated NHL: May 11, 1976
- Designated CP: March 21, 1978

The John B. Tytus House is a historic house at 300 South Main Street in Middletown, Ohio, United States. Built in 1865, it was the home of John Butler Tytus (1875–1944), who invented a practical hot wide-strip continuous steel-rolling process that transformed the American steelmaking industry. The house was designated a National Historic Landmark in 1976 due to the efforts of Jeri and Pat Rossi, who bought the house in 1970. The house was the residence of the Rossi family until 2011.

== Description and history ==
The John B. Tytus House is located in Middletown's South Main Street District, on the west side of South Main Street between Yankee Road and 4th Avenue. It is a three-story masonry structure, built out of red brick. It is L-shaped, with a stylistically eclectic set of architectural features that includes rounded arches in the Romanesque style, half-timbered gable ends in the Tudor Revival style, and an eyebrow dormer. The interior is richly decorated with carved woodwork, and has an original chandelier in the dining room.

The house was built in 1865 by John Butler Tytus Sr., owner of a local papermill, and was the lifelong home of his son, John Butler Tytus; it remained in the Tytus family until 1970 when Pat and Jeri Rossi bought the house part and parcel and embarked on renovations for the next 41 years. The younger Tytus was educated at Yale University in the humanities before entering his father's business. After his father died, he eventually landed a job at a steel factory owned by Armco, where he developed skills as an engineer and learned the manufacturing process well. Observing that efficiencies of manufacturing could be realized by being able to continuous feed hot steel through a rolling process, he set about to create such a process in 1921. By 1924 his process was sufficiently developed that the company built a new plant implementing it. The plant was an immediate success, and the process was soon widely adopted by other steelmakers. Tytus's process made possible the rolling of steel in sizes and quantities significantly larger than previous labor-intensive processes, at a significantly higher rate of production.

== See also ==
- List of National Historic Landmarks in Ohio
