= Middletown Regional Airport =

Public use airport in Middletown, Ohio

Middletown Regional Airport Hook Field
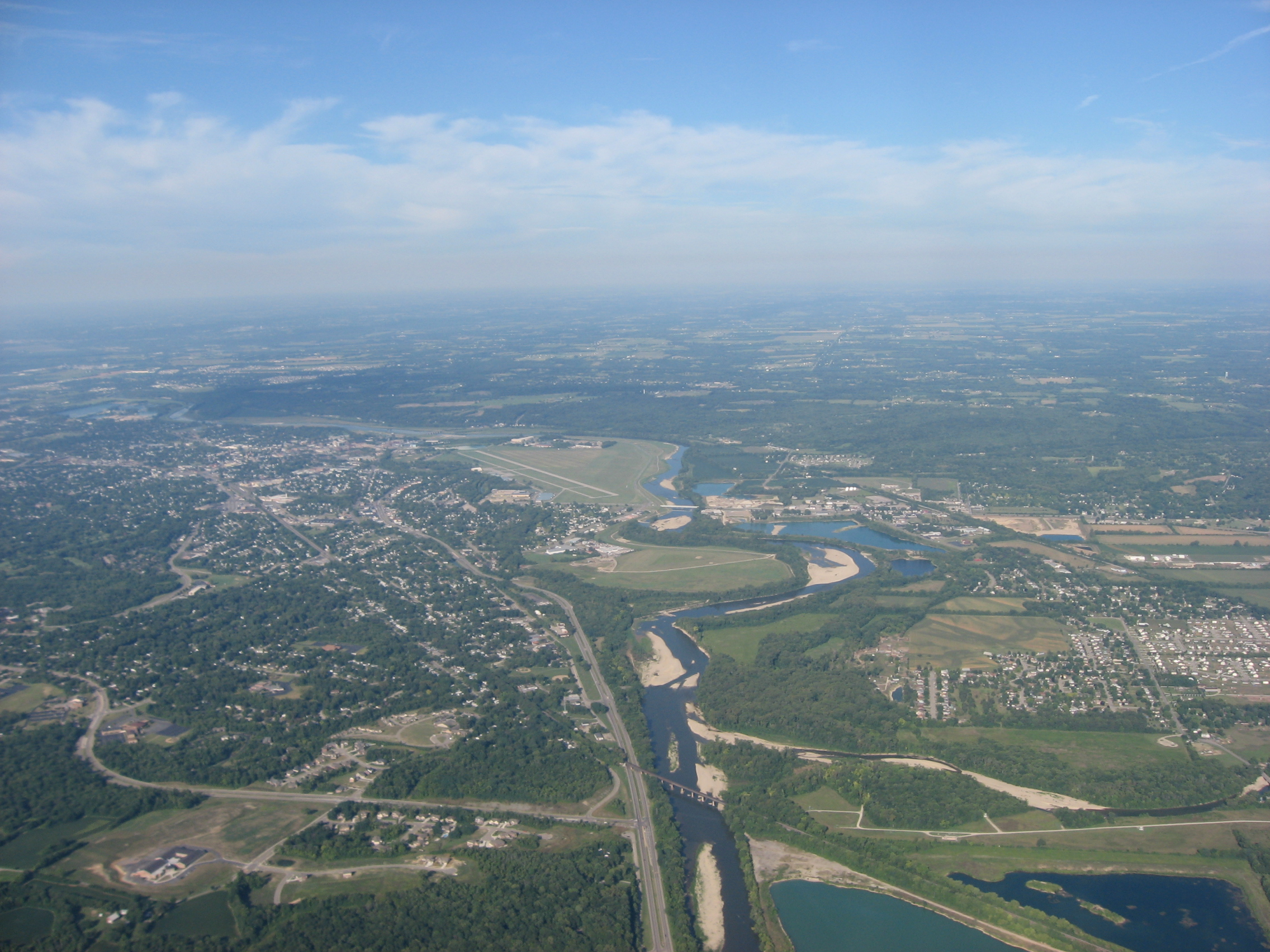
- Aerial view of airport from the east
- IATA: MWO; ICAO: KMWO; FAA LID: MWO

Summary
- Airport type: Public
- Owner: City of Middletown
- Serves: Middletown, Ohio
- Time zone: UTC−05:00 (-5)
  - Summer (DST): UTC−04:00 (-4)
- Elevation AMSL: 650 ft (200 m)
- Coordinates: 39°31′54″N 084°23′47″W
- Public transit access: BCRTA
- Website: www.HookField.com

Map
- Location of airport in Ohio MWO (the United States)

Runways
Direction	Length		Surface
Direction	ft	m	Surface
5/23	6,100	1,859	Asphalt
8/26	3,040	927	Turf

Statistics (2022)
- Aircraft operations: 40,150
- Based aircraft: 81
- Source: Federal Aviation Administration

Middletown Regional Airport, also known as Hook Field, (IATA: MWO, ICAO: KMWO, FAA LID: MWO) is a city-owned public-use airport located two nautical miles (3.7 km) north of the central business district of Middletown, a city in Butler County, Ohio, United States. The airport was renamed in October 2008; it was previously known as Hook Field Municipal Airport.

In late August 2008 the airport gained some national prominence when the Republican vice presidential nominee Sarah Palin flew into Hook to later attend a Dayton campaign rally where she was announced as Senator John McCain's running mate.

The airport is home to the Ohio Challenge Hot Air Balloon Festival, an annual event for over 20 years. There is also a nonprofit museum at the airport hosted by Butler County Warbirds, Inc.

== History ==
The airport was formed in 1925 when local businessmen formed Middletown Airport Park from a number of farms they had purchased. The following year, plans were made to acquire an additional 130 adjacent building lots for use as a civic park.

Aeronca moved to the airport in 1939–1940 from Lunken Airport after the company's factory at the latter was damaged by a flood.

A fishing pond nearby was closed in 1946 to make room for a runway extension. The extension was planned to allow aircraft from Superior Airlines of Youngstown and a corporate aircraft of American Rolling Mill Company to land at the airport.

The airport was renamed Hook Field in May 1949 after Armco chairman Charles R. Hook.

Lighting to enable night landings at the airport was installed in 1952.

A 5,100 ft (1,600 m) paved runway was added in 1961.

The airport was hit by a tornado in April 1980, damaging a number of aircraft.

The original portion of the Aeronca plant was demolished in 2005 and 2006.

It was again renamed Middletown Regional Airport in 2008.

By June 2025, construction on a 30,000 sq ft (2,800 m^{2}) aviation technical high school for Butler Tech was underway at the airport.

== Facilities and aircraft ==
Middletown Regional Airport covers an area of 550 acres (220 ha) at an elevation of 650 feet (198 m) above mean sea level. It has two runways: 5/23 is 6,100 by 100 feet (1,859 x 30 m) with an asphalt pavement; 8/26 is 3,040 by 297 feet (927 x 91 m) with a turf surface. It has the longest runway of any non-towered airport in southwest Ohio.

The airport is home to facilities managed by Butler Tech, which provides technical training for adults in the area. The school boasts a 25,000-square-foot facility that includes a 10,000-square-foot hangar.

The airport has a fixed-base operator that offers fuel; services such as general maintenance, catering, hangars, and courtesy cars; and amenities such as conference rooms, a crew lounge, snooze rooms, showers, and more.

For the 12-month period ending October 12, 2022, the airport had 40,150 aircraft operations, an average of 110 per day: 91% general aviation, 9% air taxi, and <% military. At that time there were 81 aircraft based at this airport: 77 single-engine and 2 multi-engine airplanes as well as 2 helicopters.

== Accidents and incidents ==
- On August 31, 2007, a Ercoupe 415C was substantially damaged during a hard landing at the Middletown Regional Airport. The pilot reported that he was practicing landings in preparation for a sport pilot practical test. The pilot stated that as he entered the landing flare, the airplane was right of the runway centerline, at a "very slow" airspeed. He "put [the] nose down to pick up airspeed and added a little (too little) power." The airplane landed on the nose wheel and bounced. The pilot added power but the airplane hit a second time. The airplane subsequently came to a stop and he taxied to the ramp.
- On November 21, 2008, a Piper Aerostar 6 was damaged while on approach to the Middletown Regional Airport. The pilot stated that after an uneventful flight, he entered the traffic pattern at the destination airport. He extended the landing gear as the airplane was crossing mid-field on downwind for runway 23. The pilot said he focused on maintaining airspeed and establishing the proper crosswind landing attitude. As a result, he failed to confirm the landing gear position lights in order to verify that the gear was down and locked. After landing, the left main landing gear collapsed, followed by the right main landing gear. The airplane skidded to the left and came to rest in the grass area adjacent to the runway. The pilot noted the cockpit landing gear lever provided resistance, although it was not fully in the down position. The probable cause of the accident was found to be the pilot's failure to verify that the landing gear was down and locked prior to landing.
- On June 1, 2014, a woman walked into a skydiving aircraft's spinning propeller. She later died from her injuries. The probable cause of the accident was found to be the skydiving operator employee’s failure to see and avoid the rotating propeller blades when she walked toward the cockpit while the airplane’s engines were running.

== See also ==
- List of airports in Ohio
