= Alton W. Knappenberger =

WWII Medal of Honor Recipient

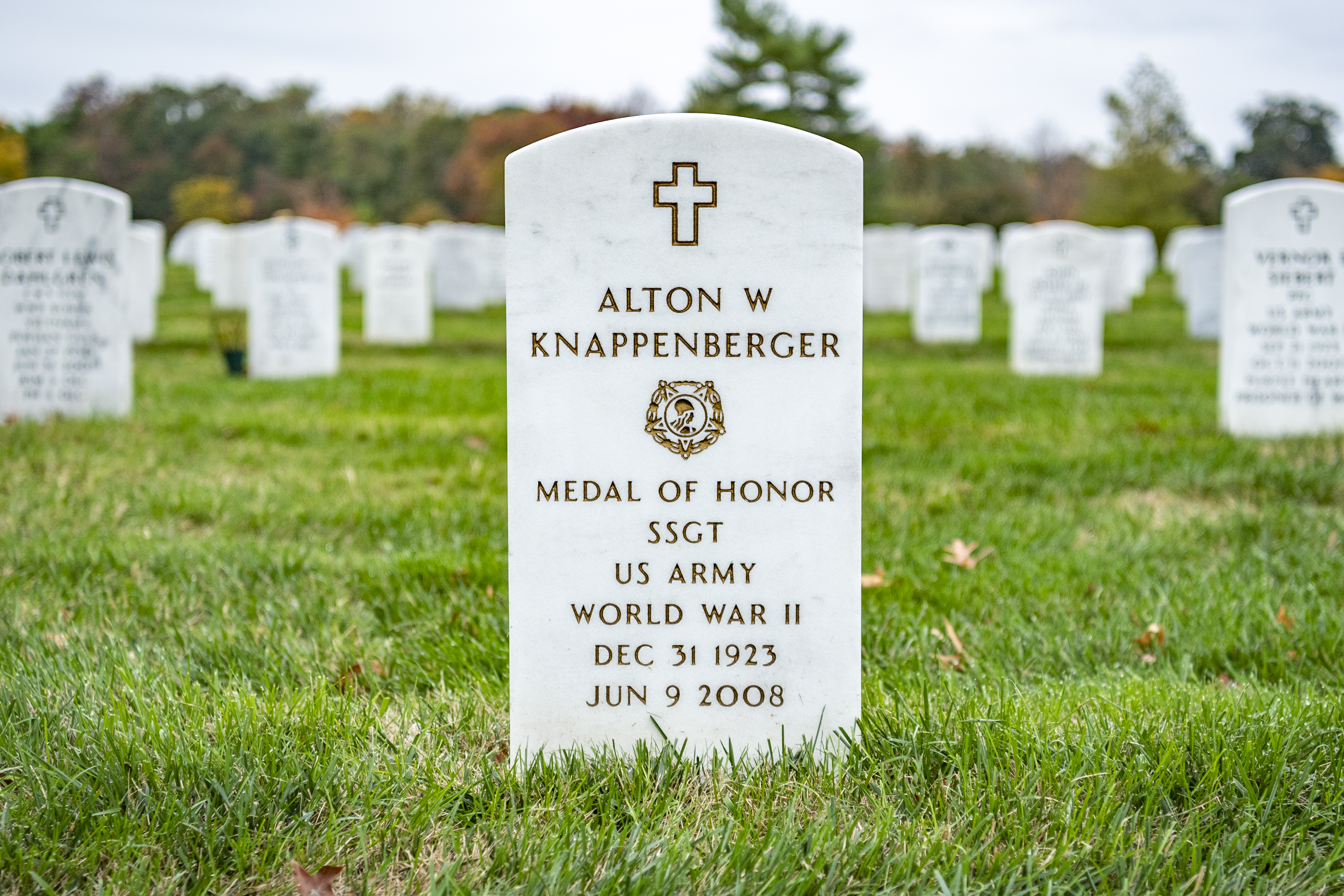
- Grave at Arlington National Cemetery
- Born: December 31, 1923; Coopersburg, Pennsylvania, U.S.
- Died: June 9, 2008 (aged 84); Pottstown, Pennsylvania, U.S.
- Military career
- Allegiance: United States of America
- Branch: United States Army
- Rank: Staff Sergeant
- Units: 30th Infantry Regiment, 3rd Infantry Division
- Conflicts: World War II; *Battle of Cisterna
- Awards: Medal of Honor

Alton Warren Knappenberger (December 31, 1923 – June 9, 2008) was a United States Army soldier and a recipient of the United States military's highest decoration—the Medal of Honor—for his actions in World War II.

Knappenberger joined the Army from Spring Mount, Pennsylvania, in March 1943, and by February 1, 1944, was serving as a private first class in the 30th Infantry Regiment, 3rd Infantry Division. On that day, during the Battle of Cisterna in Italy, Knappenberger held an exposed position alone and harassed the attacking Germans with his automatic rifle until he ran out of ammunition. For his actions during the battle, he was issued the Medal of Honor three months later, on May 26, 1944.

== Medal of Honor citation ==
Private First Class Knappenberger's official Medal of Honor citation reads:

For conspicuous gallantry and intrepidity at the risk of his life above and beyond the call of duty in action involving actual conflict with the enemy, on February 1, 1944, near Cisterna di Littoria, Italy. When a heavy German counterattack was launched against his battalion, Pfc. Knappenberger crawled to an exposed knoll and went into position with his automatic rifle. An enemy machinegun 85 yards away opened fire, and bullets struck within 6 inches of him. Rising to a kneeling position, Pfc. Knappenberger opened fire on the hostile crew, knocked out the gun, killed 2 members of the crew, and wounded the third. While he fired at this hostile position, 2 Germans crawled to a point within 20 yards of the knoll and threw potato-masher grenades at him, but Pfc. Knappenberger killed them both with 1 burst from his automatic rifle. Later, a second machinegun opened fire upon his exposed position from a distance of 100 yards, and this weapon also was silenced by his well-aimed shots. Shortly thereafter, an enemy 20mm. antiaircraft gun directed fire at him, and again Pfc. Knappenberger returned fire to wound 1 member of the hostile crew. Under tank and artillery shellfire, with shells bursting within 15 yards of him, he held his precarious position and fired at all enemy infantrymen armed with machine pistols and machine-guns which he could locate. When his ammunition supply became exhausted, he crawled 15 yards forward through steady machinegun fire, removed rifle clips from the belt of a casualty, returned to his position and resumed firing to repel an assaulting German platoon armed with automatic weapons. Finally, his ammunition supply being completely exhausted, he rejoined his company. Pfc. Knappenberger's intrepid action disrupted the enemy attack for over 2 hours.

== Awards and decorations ==

Badge	Combat Infantryman Badge		
1st row	Medal of Honor	Bronze Star Medal	Army Good Conduct Medal
2nd row	American Campaign Medal	European–African–Middle Eastern Campaign Medal with one campaign star	World War II Victory Medal

== See also ==
- List of Medal of Honor recipients
- List of Medal of Honor recipients for World War II
- https://www.knappenberger.net/alton-warren-knappenberger/
