= Lloyd C. Hawks =

Lloyd Cortez Hawks
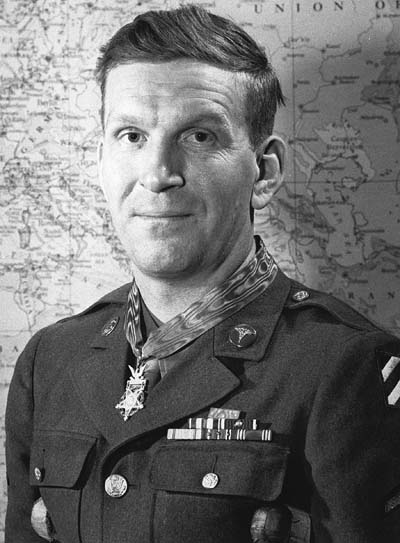
- Lloyd Hawks
- Born: January 13, 1911; Becker, Minnesota, US
- Died: October 26, 1953 (aged 42)
- Burial place: Greenwood Cemetery, Park Rapids, Minnesota
- Military career
- Allegiance: United States
- Branch: United States Army
- Service years: 1942–1953
- Rank: Sergeant First Class
- Units: 30th Infantry Regiment, 3rd Infantry Division
- Conflicts: World War II; Korean War
- Awards: Medal of Honor; Silver Star (3); Bronze Star (2); Purple Heart (3)

Lloyd Cortez Hawks (January 13, 1911 – October 26, 1953) was a United States Army soldier and a recipient of the United States military's highest decoration—the Medal of Honor—for his actions in World War II.

== Biography ==
Hawks joined the Army from Park Rapids, Minnesota in 1942, and by January 30, 1944, was serving as a private first class in the Medical Detachment of the 30th Infantry Regiment, 3rd Infantry Division. On that day, near Carano, Italy, he crawled through intense enemy fire to aid two wounded men. He dragged one man to safety but was severely wounded after returning for the second man. Despite these wounds, he was able to drag the second man to safety also. Hawks recovered from his injuries and, on January 15, 1945, was awarded the Medal of Honor.

Hawks remained in the army after World War II, and later served in the Korean War, reaching the rank of Sergeant First Class. He died from a heart attack at age 42 and was buried in Greenwood Cemetery, Park Rapids, Minnesota.

== Medal of Honor citation ==
Hawks' official Medal of Honor citation reads:

For gallantry and intrepidity at risk of life above and beyond the call of duty. On January 30, 1944, at 3 p.m., near Carano, Italy, Pfc. Hawks braved an enemy counterattack in order to rescue 2 wounded men who, unable to move, were lying in an exposed position within 30 yards of the enemy. Two riflemen, attempting the rescue, had been forced to return to their fighting holes by extremely severe enemy machinegun fire, after crawling only 10 yards toward the casualties. An aid man, whom the enemy could plainly identify as such, had been critically wounded in a similar attempt. Pfc. Hawks, nevertheless, crawled 50 yards through a veritable hail of machinegun bullets and flying mortar fragments to a small ditch, administered first aid to his fellow aid man who had sought cover therein, and continued toward the 2 wounded men 50 yards distant. An enemy machinegun bullet penetrated his helmet, knocking it from his head, momentarily stunning him. Thirteen bullets passed through his helmet as it lay on the ground within 6 inches of his body. Pfc. Hawks, crawled to the casualties, administered first aid to the more seriously wounded man and dragged him to a covered position 25 yards distant. Despite continuous automatic fire from positions only 30 yards away and shells which exploded within 25 yards, Pfc. Hawks returned to the second man and administered first aid to him. As he raised himself to obtain bandages from his medical kit his right hip was shattered by a burst of machinegun fire and a second burst splintered his left forearm. Displaying dogged determination and extreme self-control, Pfc. Hawks, despite severe pain and his dangling left arm, completed the task of bandaging the remaining casualty and with superhuman effort dragged him to the same depression to which he had brought the first man. Finding insufficient cover for 3 men at this point, Pfc. Hawks crawled 75 yards in an effort to regain his company, reaching the ditch in which his fellow aid man was lying.

== Awards and decorations ==

Badge	Combat Medical Badge		
1st row	Medal of Honor		Silver Star with two oak leaf clusters
2nd row	Bronze Star Medal with one oak leaf cluster	Purple Heart with one oak leaf cluster	Army Good Conduct Medal
3rd row	American Defense Service Medal	American Campaign Medal	European–African–Middle Eastern Campaign Medal with three campaign stars
3rd row	World War II Victory Medal	Army of Occupation Medal with 'Japan' clasp	National Defense Service Medal

War Cross of Military Valor

(Italy)

== See also ==
- List of Medal of Honor recipients
- List of Medal of Honor recipients for World War II
