= Towne Mall Galleria =

Defunct mall in Ohio

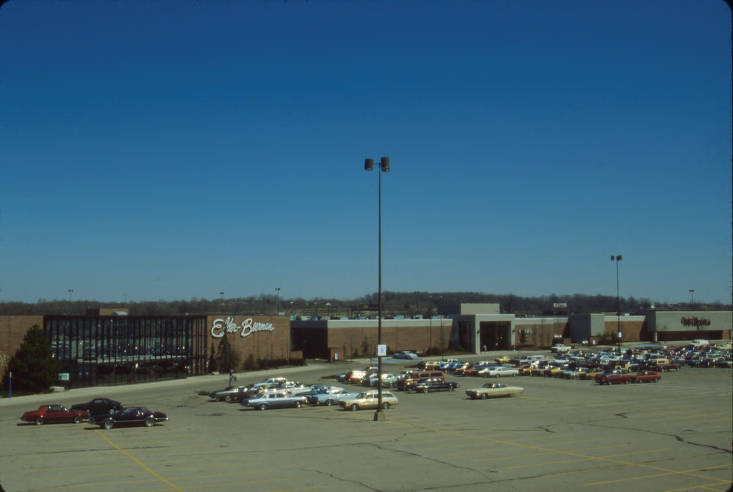
- Location: Middletown, Ohio, United States
- Coordinates: 39°29′47″N 84°19′53″W
- Opened: February 9, 1977; 49 years ago
- Closed: c. late 2021
- Previous names: Towne Mall
- Developer: Jacobs Visconsi and Jacob
- Owner: City of Middletown
- Num. of anchor tenants: 3
- Floor area: 500,000 square feet (46,000 m^{2})
- Floors: 1

Towne Mall Galleria was a 500,000 square feet (46,000 m^{2}) shopping Mall in Middletown, Ohio. It had 3 anchor stores, Elder-Beerman, McAlpin's (now Dillard's), and Sears. The mall was opened in 1977.

== History ==
Towne Mall Galleria was first called Towne Mall at its opening on February 9, 1977. Towne Mall opened with Elder-Beerman, McAlpin's, and Sears. It also had space for 55 additional stores. Towne Mall Galleria experienced a decline in occupancy during the 2000s and 2010s as several national retailers closed stores. Sears closed at the mall in 2018 as part of the company's nationwide store closure program. The mall later faced financial difficulties and redevelopment plans were proposed for the property, including mixed-use redevelopment concepts for the former mall site.

== Closure and redevelopment ==
In 2024, the City of Middletown, Ohio purchased the former Towne Mall Galleria property for future redevelopment planning. The former mall is slated for demolition as part of a redevelopment project.
