= Goodwen =

American rock band

- Origin: Middletown, Ohio, United States
- Genre: Hardcore Indie rock Progressive
- Years active: 2003–2006 [Music dates to 2000]
- Members: Tyler Elam Jordan Elam Cody Madonna Armond Luckey Dustin Schamaun
- Past members: Julie Heidorn
- Website: Official website

Goodwen was formed officially in March 2003. Originally created as a ska band, Goodwen's music later incorporated elements of hardcore punk, indie rock, and progressive rock.

The band, composed of seven members, has relentlessly toured the Midwest. Goodwen currently has one full album, En Memoria Vestrum, with plans to release a second in the future. They also have two demo CDs available. The song "Question Marks" has also been featured in the compilation from Future Destination Records, Reasons for Living.

== Background ==
Growing up in the household of the signed banjo artist Todd Elam, Tyler and Jordan Elam, (guitar and drums), along with long-time friend Dustin Smith began creating music as early as 2000.

Dustin & Tyler- “Well in the beginning.. the idea was to start a ska band.. for fun. We wrote one ska song in our first week of existence..

and that was pretty much the last time we ever did that. None of us were listening to much ska at the time.. and it wasn't really what we wanted to play. So over time, we started pushing our influences further into the mix. It's kinda like putting all of your favorite foods into a blender and hoping it will taste good. Eventually we evolved into the band we are today. We still try not to think in a musical box.. our taste in music changes so often that I wouldn’t be surprised if we wind up playing Jazz within the next few years. Who knows? But anyway.. we've always hated being called a ska band.. so please don't do it. Don't tell your friends we're a ska band

either."

Gradually as they began to expand their musical skills, more projects were developed involving more musicians using a variety of different instruments. Cody Madonna, a longtime friend of Jordan, suggested the idea of beginning a Ska band. With this development came the addition of Armond Luckey and his amazing trumpet ability, Dustin Schamaun with a deep appreciation for the underlying tones of jazz saxophone, and Julie Heidorn on trombone.

GOODWEN - Is a six member group from Middletown, Ohio that plays "progressive horn rock". The musical style is broad-based due to the diverse tastes of the group. The sound can move from heavy to soft. There are those who mistake Goodwen for a Ska band because they have a trumpet and sax. Most assuredly, they are not.~FaithFest.net."

Goodwen has stated in their Cincy CDs interview that, though the band has horns and was originally thought to be a ska band, Goodwen does not consider themselves to be a ska band, nor do they wish to be thought of as a ska band.

== Members ==
Current:

- Dustin Smith-vocals
- Tyler Elam-Guitar/backing vocals
- Jordan Elam-drums/backing vocals
- Armond Luckey-Trumpet
- Dustin Schamaun-Tenor Saxophone
- Cody Madonna-Bass guitar

Past

- Julie Heidorn-Trombone (2003–2005)

== Touring ==
Over the years, Goodwen has shared stages with many bands such as: Blindside, The Elms, Ace Troubleshooter, Roper, Dead Poetic, Cartel, Showbread and others. Touring from Wisconsin to West Virginia, the band has performed over two hundred shows.

Often the band toured with their long-time friends The Red Racer, a prominently Indie rock band from Terre Haute, Indiana.

Goodwen has also made several performances at Ichthus Christian rock festival with attendance in the tens of thousands.

== Discography ==
=== 2003 Demo ===
1. More Than Sunday
2. The You I used to Know
3. It Doesn't Change
4. A Better Way

=== Paper Bag Demo ===
1. Rust to None
2. One Nation
3. The Truth We Know Nothing Of

=== En Memoria Vestrum ===
1. The End of the End is Only the Beginning
2. "Question Marks"
3. The Long Road I Hope to Take Again
4. In Order to Prevent Further Confusion
5. A Light in our Darkest Hour
6. A Glance at the Present From the Past

=== Reasons for Living ===
Future Destinations Compilation

- -Question Marks (19)

Reasons for Living

== Videography ==
DVD

- Our Band Can Beat Up Your Band, We Talked About It The Whole Way Home

Online Video Sample

- Goodwen Video 1

== Controversy-a New Reality ==
In late 2005 Goodwen was contacted by an anonymous solo performer dubbed A New Reality, who claimed that Goodwen had stolen his music without consent. The performer has no formal proof other than a recording of the song "A Glance at the Present from the Past" performed differently. There have since been no further accusations.

== Future ==
In early 2006, Cody Madonna declared that he would be taking a year-long certification course in Orlando, Florida to become a licensed Harley Davidson mechanic. Unable to perform without a bass guitar player, Goodwen decided to take a break. Though the official final show of Goodwen was March 3, 2006 at 4th and Main in Franklin, Ohio, the band has since performed one reunion show at The Garage in Springboro Ohio From the message boards, with the return of Cody scheduled for the summer of 2007, Goodwen has plans to write and record new material. Members have also claimed that they expect a new album release mid to late summer of 2007, which will contain several songs already written in the Goodwen Archives as well as songs currently being written.

=== Distributors ===
- Cincy Cds-Promoters: En Memoria Vestrum
- Future Destinations Records- Producers: Reason for Living

== Media/News/Interviews ==
Cox News Goodwen Article (Rocking at the Alter)

Concert Listing

Cincy CD's Interview

Goodwen News Video Footage (QuickTime)
