= 30th Infantry Regiment (United States) =

30th Regiment 30th Infantry Regiment
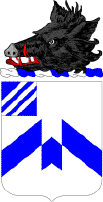
- Coat of Arms
- Founded: 1901-present
- Country: United States
- Branch: United States Army
- Type: Infantry
- Size: Regiment
- Motto: Our Country Not Ourselves
- Engagements: Philippine–American War; World War I World War II; War on terror

Commanders
- Notable commanders: John M. Jenkins; Irving J. Phillipson; Lionel C. McGarr

Insignia
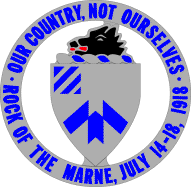
- Distinctive insignia

The 30th Infantry Regiment is a United States Army infantry regiment. Two battalions are currently active under the United States Army Regimental System; there is no active regimental headquarters, with regimental designation being used only for historical tradition.

== General history ==
=== Previous units designated "30th Infantry Regiment" ===
A unit designated the 30th Infantry Regiment was first constituted in 1813. President James Madison formed the 30th Regiment to combat English forces during the War of 1812. However, the regiment spent much of the war in training, and did not see much action. After the war ended, the 30th Regiment was disbanded.

When the Civil War began, the 30th Regiment was recreated and reassigned as the 12th Infantry Regiment. The regiment made its home at Fort Hamilton in New York, and shortly thereafter traveled to Washington, District of Columbia. Until 1862, the regiment was designated as a reserve brigade in the Army of the Potomac. After the end of the Civil War, the 12th Brigade was disbanded. In 1901, however, the Philippine Insurrection raged. The 1st Battalion was re-formed, once more under the 30th Regiment, and sent to the Philippines, where they spent most of their time in the Mindiano Province.

=== Present 30th Infantry Regiment ===
The present 30th Infantry was constituted on 2 February 1901 in the Regular Army, and was organized from 12 February–19 August 1901 at Fort Logan, Colorado, the Presidio of San Francisco, California, and in the Philippines. After U.S. entry into World War I, the regiment was assigned on 21 November 1917 to the 3rd Division.

==== Interwar period ====
The 30th Infantry Regiment arrived at the port of New York on 20 August 1919 on the troopship USAT America and was transferred on 26 August 1919 to Camp Pike, Arkansas. It was again transferred on 21 September 1921 to Camp Lewis (later Fort Lewis), Washington, with the rest of the 3rd Division. In 1921-22, most of the units of the 3rd Division were relocated from Camp Lewis throughout the western United States and Alaska for their permanent stations; the 30th Infantry sailed on 26 August 1922 for San Francisco, California, aboard the troopship USAT Buford, arriving on 30 August 1922 at the Presidio. The regiment's initial wartime mission in accordance with established war plans was to conduct a mobile defense of possible amphibious landing areas in support of the Harbor Defenses of San Francisco. On 31 January 1932, the regiment sailed on the troopship USAT St. Mihiel to the Territory of Hawaii to conduct an amphibious assault landing exercise from 12–16 February 1932 against the Hawaiian Division at Makua, Oahu. The regiment sailed for Fort Mason, California, on 20 February 1932 on the St. Mihiel and arrived there 26 February 1932, returning to the Presidio on the same date. From 1935 to 1938, the regiment was commanded by irving J. Phillipson, and it participated in the opening ceremonies for the Golden Gate Bridge in June 1937. It was transferred 5 January 1940 to Fort Ord, California. It was relieved on 12 January 1940 from the 3rd Division, and returned to the Presidio of San Francisco on 15 May 1940, where it was reassigned to the 3rd Division. Transferred 31 March 1941 to Fort Lewis.

- Relieved 6 April 1951 from assignment to the 3rd Infantry Division
- Assigned 2 December 1954 to the 3rd Infantry Division
- Relieved 1 July 1957 from assignment to the 3rd Infantry Division and reorganized as a parent regiment under the Combat Arms Regimental System
- Withdrawn 16 June 1989 from the Combat Arms Regimental System, reorganized under the U.S. Army Regimental System, and transferred to the United States Army Training and Doctrine Command
- Withdrawn 26 May 1992 from the United States Army Training and Doctrine Command

== 1st Battalion ==
HHC, 1st Battalion, 30th Infantry Regiment, was reconstituted on 2 February 1901 in the Regular Army as Company A, 30th Infantry. It organized on 16 March 1901 at the Presidio of San Francisco. Thereafter, the 30th Infantry was assigned on 21 November 1917 to the 3d Division; relieved on 12 January 1940 from assignment to the 3d Division; reassigned on 15 May 1940 to the 3d Division (later redesignated as the 3d Infantry Division); relieved on 6 April 1951 from assignment to the 3d Infantry Division; and reassigned on 2 December 1954 to the 3d Infantry Division.

The unit was reorganized and redesignated on 1 July 1957 as Headquarters and Headquarters Company, 1st Battle Group, 30th Infantry, and remained assigned to the 3d Infantry Division. The unit was reorganized and redesignated on 10 July 1963 as the 1st Battalion, 30th Infantry. It inactivated on 16 June 1989 in Germany and was relieved from assignment to the 3d Infantry Division.

The battalion was reassigned on 16 August 1992 to the 3d Infantry Division and activated in Germany. It inactivated there on 15 January 1994. It reactivated on 16 February 1996 at Fort Benning.

In 2006 the 1st Battalion, 30th Infantry Regiment was moved from the 3d BCT to the 2d BCT as part of the modularity program.

=== Iraq ===
The 1st Battalion, 30th Infantry Regiment deployed with the 3d Brigade, 3d Infantry Division to Kuwait in January 2003 during the buildup of forces before the invasion of Iraq. When the invasion started on 19 March, 1-30 was one of the first battalions to cross the border, eventually working its way to Tallil, where it fought its first engagement. The day after taking Tallil Airfield, a portion of the battalion's scout platoon was ambushed on a bridge outside of An Nasaria, wounding two of the scouts. One of the scouts and the battalion S3 both were later awarded Silver Stars for their actions on the bridge that day. While on Tallil Airfield, the battalion conducted "Operation Dirty Deeds," which consisted of looking for WMDs inside the airfield. After Tallil, 1-30 was ordered to secure the lines of communication and man checkpoints for a couple of days while the rest of the 3d Brigade continued combat operations in the vicinity.

A few days later, Company B attacked As Samawah while its 1st Platoon continued to hold a defensive position near Nasiriyah. When the Fedayeen were defeated in As Samawah and 1st Platoon rejoined the company, 1-30 continued its movement north with the rest of 3d Brigade. At the same time, Company C was ordered to march over 35 km to support the taking of OBJ Vikings, a bridge outside the city of Ash Shinafiya. Company C took with them the Mortar Platoon, Section B from the scout platoon and the forward aid station. While Company C was holding the objective, three tanks, one of the scouts' vehicles, and an M113 engaged in an extended firefight on the opposite side of the bridge during a patrol. The engagement ended with 35 or more Iraqi soldiers killed, and not one American casualty. This firefight was documented by Time Magazine's Alex Perry. He and his photographer were in the M113 during the firefight. 1-30 next saw action at Karbala, where it secured the Karbala Gap in order to allow the safe passage of 3rd Brigade in its movement towards Baghdad. 1-30 held Karbala Gap for two days until relieved by elements from the 101st Airborne Division (Air Assault). During those two days, Company B of 1-30, most notably 1st and 3d Platoons, inflicted heavy losses on Iraqi Republican Guard units on the outskirts of the city. The Scout Platoon and Troop D, 10th Cavalry, the 3d Brigade's reconnaissance troop also inflicted heavy losses on the Medina Republican Guard Division with artillery fire and by spotting rounds for the Bradley Fighting Vehicles as they fired into the city.

After Karbala, 1-30 rejoined 3d Brigade and continued its march on Baghdad. On 6 April, the battalion reached the city and, with 1st Platoon of Company B, in the lead, fought several engagements with defending Republican Guard units. By 10 April, the battalion pushed its way into Baghdad and set up its headquarters at a water-treatment facility in the northwestern sector of the city. It participated in combat patrols and humanitarian relief missions until relieved in June 2003.

1st Battalion, 30th Infantry moved back to Kuwait in June 2003 and flew back to Fort Benning, Georgia at the end of July. The unit again saw action during Operation Iraqi Freedom III.

Welcome sign to the fort of the 30th Infantry

The 1st Battalion, 30th Infantry Regiment deployed from Fort Benning on 8 January 2005. The deployment began in Kuwait, where the battalion prepared its equipment and conducted final training exercises prior moving north to Iraq. The 1st Battalion, 30th Infantry Regiment then road marched by land and air into FOB Normandy, Iraq on 21 January 2005. Company B was attached to the 3d Brigade, 42d Infantry Division (New York National Guard) Headquarters at FOB Warhorse, to serve as a quick reaction force. In Iraq 1st Battalion, 30th Infantry Regiment was organized as Task Force 1-30, which included Battery B, 1st Battalion, 10th Field Artillery Regiment and Company B, 2d Battalion, 34th Armor Regiment. The next 11 months Task Force 1–30 conducted several operations throughout the province of Diyalah.

In June 2005, Company B, 1-30th Infantry, was attached to 2nd Battalion, 69th Armor Regiment, and moved to Ar Ramadi, in the Anbar Province. As part of 2-69th Armor for the following seven months, Company B, 1-30th Infantry participated in over 200 combat missions and was responsible for over 500 enemy KIA. Its most notable actions occurred in two separate battles at ECP 5 in eastern Ramadi. The first engagement involved 1st Platoon, Company B, and a platoon from a Pennsylvania Army National Guard unit. On 15 September 2005, hundreds of enemy combatants launched a coordinated attack across Ramadi. In the east, the focal point became ECP 5. 1st Platoon, Company B, serving as 2-69's quick reaction force, quickly responded to the attack on the ECP and killed over 65 enemy personnel and saved the badly outnumbered guardsmen. One month later, another large group of enemy combatants again attacked ECP 5. 3rd Platoon, Company B, responded and had nearly identical results as 1st Platoon. Company B suffered two KIA and over a dozen wounded in Ramadi. In January 2006, Company B rejoined the rest of the battalion in Kuwait.

In January 2006, Task Force 1-30 was reorganized back to 1st Battalion, 30th Infantry Regiment at Fort Benning.

During the months of January and February 2005, 1st Battalion, 30th Infantry Regiment prepared its soldiers and equipment for future operations in Iraq. In Kuwait the battalion conducted several weapons ranges, added armor on vehicles, and tested equipment. The month of January was finished by the ground assault convoy, into Iraq. Over 800 soldiers, 100 vehicles, and several containers of equipment all traveled over 300 miles (480 km) into the heart of Iraq.

In February 2005 1st Battalion, 30th Infantry Regiment consolidated on FOB Normandy, located near the city of Muqdadiyah. They were met by 2d Battalion, 2d Infantry Regiment, which had successfully completed operations in Iraq during OIF II. In March 2005, 1st Battalion, 30th Infantry Regiment organized into Task Force 1–30 and conducted relief in place operations and transfer of authority with 2nd Battalion, 2nd Infantry which set the stage for future operations during OIF III. In addition, Task Force 1–30 was introduced to the 205th Iraq National Guard/2d Battalion, 2d Infantry Regiment, occupying FOB Normandy, who became partners to help complete the mission.

Between March and December 2005, Task Force 1–30 conducted several operations. These operations ranged from offensive coalition operations to civil military affairs operations intended to rebuild and promote democracy in the local Iraqi population. With every operation the task force partnered with Iraqis to complete the mission. In March, Task Force 1–30 conducted its first major operation in the city of Mansuriyat-Al-Jabal, known as Operation Spring Cleaning. The operation resulted in the capture of eight HVIs and a large weapons cache. In April 2005, Task Force 1–30 conducted Operation Morning Rain into Mukhisa – Abu Karmah, which resulted in the capture of several enemy fighters and capture several of weapon caches.

In July 2005, Task Force 1–30 with Iraqi Army and Iraqi police conducted Operation Longest Yard which also ended with the capture of several enemy fighters and capture of several weapons caches. The mission statement from the task force commander states, "TF 1–30 trains and develops Iraqi Security Forces, conducts Civil Military Operations, and neutralizes Anti Iraqi Forces in order to contribute to Iraqi self-reliance in area or operation BATTLE. On order, TF 1–30 conducts out-of-sector combat operations to destroy enemy forces in order to prevent the enemy from disrupting progress toward Iraqi self-reliance."

In January 2006, Task Force 1–30 was redeployed from Iraq to Fort Benning in the United States.

After redeploying to the U.S., 1-30 Infantry Regiment was re-designated as the 3-1 Cavalry Regiment.

The 1st Battalion, 30th Infantry Regiment was then reinstated on 6 September 2006, at Fort Stewart in a re-flagging ceremony. The regiment took over the place of the 3d Battalion, 15th Infantry Regiment as part of the reorganization to modular units of actions for the 3d Infantry Division.

The 1st Battalion, 30th Infantry Regiment participated in the "Surge" ordered by President George Bush in early 2007 to reinforce Coalition forces in and around Baghdad, Iraq due to the increase of violence and attacks from Al Qaida and insurgents. 1-30 IN, under the command of LTC Kenneth Adgie, deployed to Iraq, to FOB Falcon south of Baghdad in May 2007 and built several patrol bases in Arab Jabour, the countryside east of FOB Falcon. As many as 14 previous attempts to infiltrate this area were unsuccessful, due to numerous IEDs (improvised explosive devices) and enemy activity. 1-30 Infantry's mission was to clear this area of Al Qaida and insurgents, and help prevent the flow of weapons into Baghdad, as well as re-establish rapport and good relations with the local population. From June 2007 to August 2008, 1st Battalion was instrumental in driving enemy forces out of the region south of Baghdad in large operations such as Marne Torch and Marne Thunderbolt, and succeeded in helping establish the "Sons of Iraq", a police force consisting of local citizens to help keep order and also helped establish the basic infrastructure. In mid 2008, 1-30 Infantry sent at least 2 platoons of soldiers to Sadr City to participate in the siege of Sadr City to quell fighting there. 1-30 Infantry redeployed to Fort Stewart; GA in August 2008.† 1-30 Infantry was then commanded by LTC Dan Cormier in late 2008, and began preparing for deployment to Northern Iraq in 2009. 1-30th Infantry served from December 2009 until October 2010 in Iraq, primarily in the ethnic hotbed of Kirkuk and conducted combined check points with the Iraqi army and Kurdish Peshmerga. LTC Cormier re-deployed the unit in October 2010 and relinquished command of the battalion to LTC Mike Jason on 26 January 2011.

=== Enduring Freedom ===
In the summer of 2011, the 1st Battalion 30th Infantry Regiment became the first 3ID unit on Fort Stewart to receive and train on the Army's newest M1A2 SEP tanks and M3 Bradley Fighting Vehicles. The battalion conducted training exercises and a Level II gunnery through October 2011, making it the first 3ID Battalion to reach a high state of readiness. In November 2011 the battalion was ordered to prepare for an immediate deployment to Afghanistan.

The battalion immediately reorganized to a light infantry organization. The Cobra Tank Company remained relatively unchanged and began training on new MATV vehicles and would serve as the "anti-tank" wheeled company. Soldiers from the HHC Scout platoon, and the remaining companies reorganized into three balanced rifle companies. Working with 5th Special Forces Group, the battalion entered a fast-paced training plan culminating in a single battalion exercise at the National Training Center. During this exercise, half of the battalion staff was already in Afghanistan on the Torch Party.

Nearly 48 hours after returning to Ft. Stewart from the Mojave Desert, the unit began deploying to Afghanistan. A Company, with attachments from C and F Companies was attached to Marine and Army special operations in Helmand. B Company with C and F Company attachments was also attached to Marine SOF in Herat. The rest of the battalion became Special Operations Task Force North, or Task Force Balkh, in Mazar-e Sharif, Afghanistan. Here the task force was task organized with US Army SOF, Navy SEALs, and other attachments to conduct village stability operations (VSO) while assigned to Combined Joint Special Operations Forces- Afghanistan (CJSOTF-A). 1st Battalion, 30th Infantry was the first mechanized unit in US history to serve as a special operations task force and the first ground combat unit of the 3d Infantry Division to deploy to Afghanistan.

During this time, the unit adopted the unofficial motto of "Hold the Line!" which echoed back to the unit's stand on the Marne River in World War I, later on the Arno River in World War II, the Tigris in Iraq, and lately the Helmand River in Afghanistan.

In the spring of 2012, TF 1-30th served as the Combined Forces Special Operations Component Command- Afghanistan (CFSOCC-A), conducting the first accelerated Afghan Local Police program in the remote province of Takhar, on the border with Tajikistan. With partnered Afghan Commando forces, the Task Force conducted over 45 direct action air assaults, clearing white space in support of village stability operations, the Commander ISAF's counter insurgency main effort. Scores of high-value targets and enemy forces were captured or removed from the battlefield.

In Helmand and Herat, A and B Companies were often in daily contact with enemy forces. HHC mortars and medics were scattered throughout the country supporting numerous village stability sites; they were consistently praised for the actions while in contact. C Company platoons, task organized with F Company logisticians, provided ground supplies to over 40 separate remote outposts throughout Afghanistan and drove over 47,000 miles during the deployment. In June 2012, the battalion executive officer was killed in an accident.

1st Battalion 30th Infantry redeployed to Fort Stewart in late October 2012. The battalion took leave and returned to reorganize again as a combined arms battalion. For their actions in Afghanistan, the unit was nominated for the Meritorius Unit Award.

LTC Michael D. Jason relinquished command of the battalion to LTC Dan Teeter on 25 January 2013.

== 2nd Battalion ==
In 1901, however, the Philippine Insurrection raged. The 2nd Battalion was re-formed, once more under the 30th Regiment, and sent to the Philippines, was they spent most of their time in the Mindanao Province.

In 1918, the 2nd Battalion saw action during World War I under the 3rd Division (redesignated 3d Infantry Division on 1 August 1942). The 2nd Battalion saw action at the Chateau Thierry-Marne Counteroffensive, where the 30th Regiment successfully held off 25 German counterattacks. After the Marne Counteroffensive, the 2d Battalion saw action in the Somme Defensive, the battle of Chateau Thierry, the Aisne Defensive, the Champagne-Marne Defensive, the St. Mihiel Offensive (1st Army Sector), the Battle of Meuse–Argonne, and the Aisne-Marne Offensive. After the war ended, the 2nd Battalion served as a part of the Army of Occupation of Germany.

In 1919, the 3rd Infantry Division moved back to the US, and set up at Fort Lewis. The 30th Infantry, in turn, was stationed there, where they remained until the start of World War II in late 1941. The regiment moved to Fort Ord, California, where they practiced amphibious tactics for the battles in North Africa. The 30th took part in Operation Torch, the liberation of French Northern Africa, and helped liberate the city of Casablanca. The 30th stayed near Tunisia until 1943, during which they prepared for the invasion of Sicily.

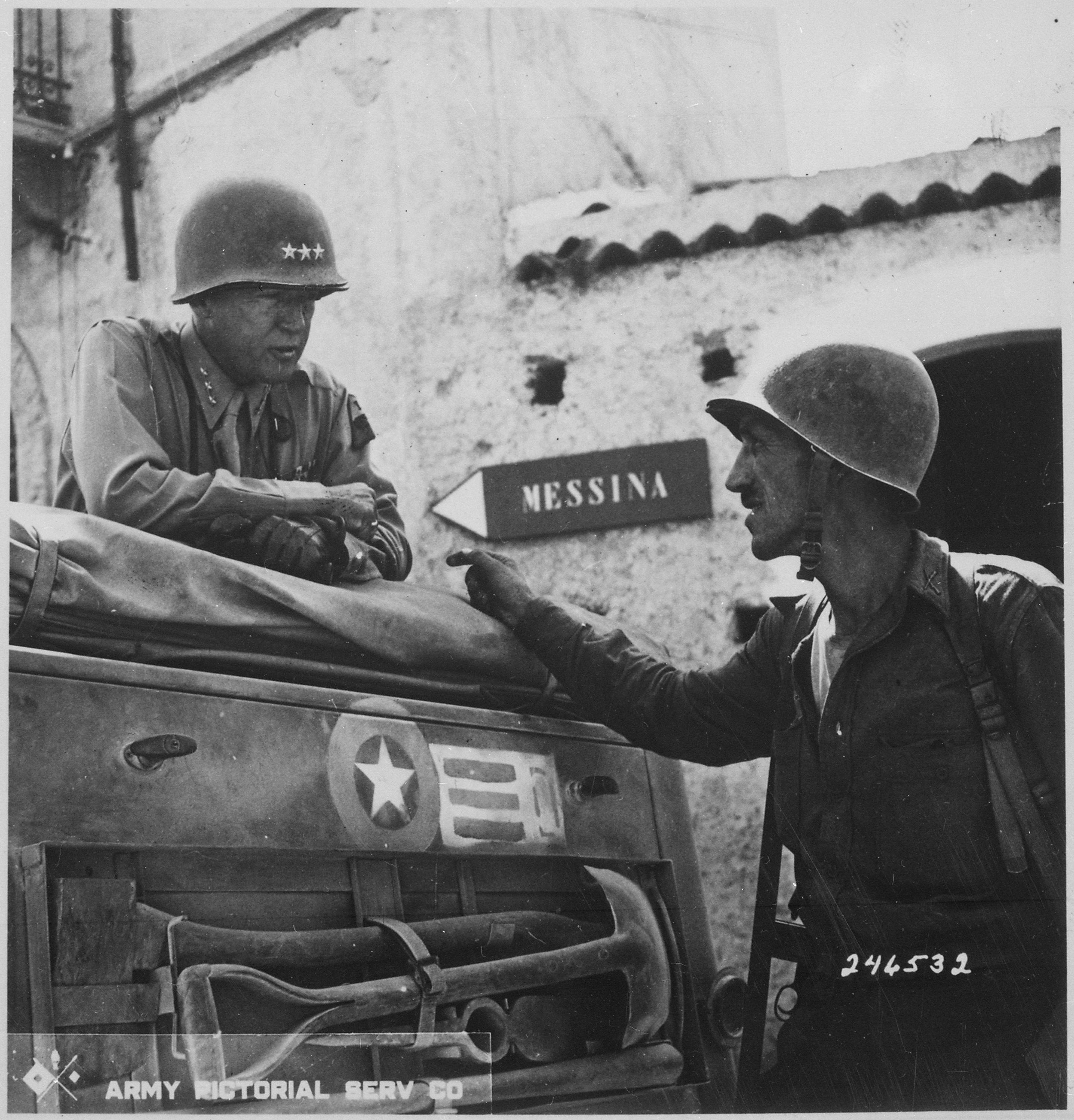
Lieutenant Colonel Lyle W. Bernard, commanding the 2nd Battalion, 30th Infantry Regiment, in conversation with Lieutenant General George S. Patton, commanding the U.S. Seventh Army, near Brolo, Sicily, July 1943.

In July 1943, the 30th Infantry and US 3rd Infantry Division was designated as "Joss Force" for the Invasion of Sicily Operation Husky On 10 July 1943 the US 3rd Infantry Division moved on shore captured and secured the City of Licata. Within three hours of landing, the US 3rd Infantry Division captured and secured. Within two days of landing, they had captured and secured the City of Agrigento. Four days later, the US 3rd Infantry Division captured the City of Palermo, traversing 100 miles of the roughest terrain on Sicily. They arrived in Palermo on 16 July 1943. The 30th moved into the lead for the US 3rd Infantry Division, moving eastward toward the city of Messina.

During the Battle of San Agata, General Patton specifically chose the 2nd Battalion, 30th Infantry to move to the right flank of the 29th Panzer Grenadier Division. The objective was for the 2nd Battalion, 30th Infantry Regiment to make a sea-borne landing at Brolo and cut off the 29th Panzer Grenadier Division from escaping Messina. The 2nd Battalion failed in their first attempt to cut the 29th off. However, General Patton ordered the battalion to re-engage the enemy. The second time, the battalion successfully maneuvered around the 29th Division. The 2nd Battalion, 30th Infantry successfully engaged an entire division for as long as possible, nearly an hour and a half. Although the majority of the 29th Panzer Grenadier Division successfully retrograded, the 2nd Battalion received the Presidential Unit Citation award.

The 2nd Battalion then continued operations throughout the "boot" of Italy, including operations in Salerno, Acerno, Volturara, Avellino, and Mount Rotundo. On 22 January 1944, the 30th Regiment conducted amphibious operations at Anzio. This marked the 2nd Battalion's fifth amphibious operation and was also its most costly battle. On 4 June 1944, the regiment entered Rome.

On 28 August 1944, the 30th made its final amphibious landing at Cavalaire, a town in Southern France. It spent the majority of September through December 1944 fighting in the Vosges Mountains and began its assault on the Siegfried Line in Austria on 15 March 1945. On 8 May 1945, the war in Europe ended, and the 2nd Battalion began stability operations in Western Europe.

The 2nd Battalion, 30th Infantry was relieved on 6 April 1951 from assignment to the 3d Infantry Division and subsequently reassigned on 2 December 1954 to the 3d Infantry Division. It was inactivated again on 1 July 1957 at Fort Benning, Georgia, and relieved from assignment to the 3d Infantry Division.

When the Army reorganized under the Pentomic concept, the former Company B, 30th Infantry Regiment was reorganized and redesignated on 3 January 1958 as Headquarters and Headquarters Company, 2nd Battle Group, 30th Infantry, with its organic elements concurrently constituted. The battle group was formally activated on 22 January 1958 at Fort Sill, Oklahoma. (Note: The lineages of the pre-1958 2d Battalion and today's 2d Battalion are separate. The lineage of the present HHC, 2-30th Infantry perpetuates the lineage of Company B, 1st Battalion, 30th Infantry.)

It was reorganized and redesignated 1 April 1963 as the 2nd Battalion, 30th Infantry, and assigned to the 3d Infantry Division. It was again inactivated on 16 June 1989 in Germany and relieved from assignment to the 3d Infantry Division.

On 16 January 2005, the unit was assigned to the 3rd Brigade Combat Team, 10th Mountain Division, and activated at Fort Polk, Louisiana. It was redesignated on 1 October 2005 as the 2d Battalion, 30th Infantry Regiment.

=== Afghanistan and Iraq ===
In November 2006, the 2-30th Infantry deployed with other elements of the 4th Brigade Combat Team, 10th Mountain Division to Afghanistan as part of Operation Enduring Freedom. It served there with Task Force Warrior until returning to Fort Polk in 2007.

In the fall of 2007, soldiers of 2nd Battalion, 30th Infantry Regiment deployed to East Baghdad, Iraq and continued their mission until early 2009. During that time, the battalion fought along the eastern boundary of Sadr City, eventually participating in the Siege of Sadr City in mid-2008. The U.S. military claimed that between 3 May and 9 May, it had killed at least 76 militiamen. In preparations for operations in Afghanistan, 2nd Battalion, 30th Infantry Regiment deployed to Camp Guernsey Army Airfield, Wyoming, in February 2010 to conduct month-long training. 2nd Battalion, 30th Infantry Regiment deployed to Afghanistan in the fall of 2010, returning in October 2011. They then deployed again to Afghanistan in July 2013 and returned in early 2014.

== Company E ==
The separate Company E (LRP), 30th Infantry was activated on 25 August 1966 at Fort Rucker, AL, to assist in providing training to aviators at the Aviation Center during the Vietnam War. A message from the Department of the Army dated 31 January 1969 dictated that the LRP designation be dropped, and on 1 July 1978 the company was inactivated, with remaining personnel being assigned to Company C (Pathfinder), 509th Infantry, also stationed at Fort Rucker.

=== Campaign participation credit ===
Philippine Insurrection

- Mindoro 1901

World War I

- Aisne
- Champagne-Marne
- Aisne-Marne
- St. Mihiel
- Meuse-Argonne
- Champagne 1918

World War II

- Algeria-French Morocco (with arrowhead)
- Tunisia
- Sicily (with arrowhead)
- Naples-Foggia
- Anzio (with arrowhead)
- Rome-Arno
- Southern France (with arrowhead)
- Rhineland
- Ardennes-Alsace
- Central Europe

=== Awards & decorations ===
- Presidential Unit Citation (Army), Streamer embroidered SICILY
- Presidential Unit Citation (Army), Streamer embroidered MOUNT ROTUNDO
- Presidential Unit Citation (Army), Streamer embroidered BESANCON, FRANCE
- Presidential Unit Citation (Army), Streamer embroidered COLMAR
- French Croix de Guerre with Palm, World War I, Streamer embroidered CHAMPAGNE-MARNE
- French Croix de Guerre with Palm, World War II, Streamer embroidered COLMAR
- French Croix de Guerre, World War II, Fourragere
- Valorous Unit Award (Army), Operation Iraqi Freedom, Baghdad Iraq December 2007 – January 2009
- Valorous Unit Award (Army), Operation Enduring Freedom, (less Company A) 1 April 2011 to 1 Sept. 2011, to include the following attached or assigned units: Company F, 94th Support Battalion (1 Aug. 2011 to 1 Sept. 2011)

== Campaign participation credit ==
- Philippine Insurrection: Mindoro 1901
- World War I: Aisne; Champagne-Marne; Aisne-Marne; St. Mihiel; Meuse-Argonne; Champagne 1918
- World War II: Algeria-French Morocco (with arrowhead); Tunisia; Sicily (with arrowhead); Naples-Foggia; Anzio (with arrowhead); Rome-Arno; Southern France (with arrowhead); Rhineland; Ardennes-Alsace; Central Europe
- War on terror

== Decorations ==
- Presidential Unit Citation for Sicily
- Presidential Unit Citation for Mount Rotundo
- Presidential Unit Citation for Besançon, France
- Presidential Unit Citation for the Colmar Pocket
- Presidential Unit Citation for Iraq 2003
- Superior Unit Award for 1996
- French Croix de Guerre with Palm, World War I for Champagne-Marne
- French Croix de guerre with Palm, World War II for the Colmar Pocket
- French Croix de guerre, World War II, Fourragere
- Valorous Unit Citation for Logar and Wardak Province, Afghanistan, 1 April 2011- 1 September 2011.

The following soldiers were awarded the Medal of Honor while serving with the 30th Infantry Regiment. All earned their medals during World War II at the date and place given.

- Captain Maurice Britt, Company L, 10 November 1943, north of Mignano, Italy
- Technician Fifth Grade Eric G. Gibson, Company I, 28 January 1944, near Isola Bella, Italy
- Private First Class Lloyd C. Hawks, Company G, 30 January 1944, near Carano, Italy
- Private First Class Alton W. Knappenberger, Company C, 1 February 1944, near Cisterna di Littoria, Italy
- Sergeant John C. Squires, Company A, 23–24 April 1944, near Padiglione, Italy
- Private First Class Patrick L. Kessler, Company K, 23 May 1944, Ponte Rotto, Italy
- Private First Class John W. Dutko, Company A, 23 May 1944, near Ponte Rotto, Italy
- Sergeant Harold O. Messerschmidt, Company L, 17 September 1944, Radden, France
- Staff Sergeant Lucian Adams, Company I, 28 October 1944, near Saint-Dié, France
- Private Wilburn K. Ross, Company G, 30 October 1944, near Saint-Jacques, France
- First Lieutenant Charles P. Murray, Jr., Company C, 16 December 1944, near Kaysersberg, France
- Technical Sergeant Russell E. Dunham, Company I, 8 January 1945, near Kaysersberg, France
