= South Middletown, Ohio =

- Former CDP
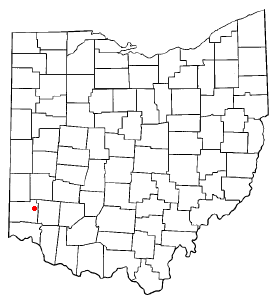
- Location of South Middletown, Ohio
- Coordinates: 39°28′55″N 84°24′46″W
- Country: United States
- State: Ohio
- County: Butler

Area
  - Total: 0.12 sq mi (0.3 km^{2})
  - Land: 0.12 sq mi (0.3 km^{2})
  - Water: 0 sq mi (0.0 km^{2})
- Elevation: 636 ft (194 m)

Population (2000)
  - Total: 264
  - Density: 2,472/sq mi (954.5/km^{2})
- Time zone: UTC-5 (Eastern (EST))
  - Summer (DST): UTC-4 (EDT)
- FIPS code: 39-73510
- GNIS feature ID: 1867468

South Middletown is a former census-designated place (CDP) in Lemon Township, Butler County, Ohio, United States. The population was 264 at the 2000 census. The area of South Middletown is now within the city limits of Middletown.

== Geography ==
South Middletown is located at 39°28′55″N 84°24′46″W (39.481858, -84.412822).

According to the United States Census Bureau, the CDP had a total area of 0.1 square miles (0.26 km^{2}), all land.

== Demographics ==
As of the census of 2000, there were 264 people, 96 households, and 62 families residing in the CDP. The population density was 2,472.2 inhabitants per square mile (954.5/km^{2}). There were 107 housing units at an average density of 1,002.0 per square mile (386.9/km^{2}). The racial makeup of the CDP was 98.11% White, 0.38% African American, and 1.52% from two or more races. Hispanic or Latino of any race were 0.76% of the population.

There were 96 households, out of which 30.2% had children under the age of 18 living with them, 51.0% were married couples living together, 9.4% had a female householder with no husband present, and 34.4% were non-families. 25.0% of all households were made up of individuals, and 10.4% had someone living alone who was 65 years of age or older. The average household size was 2.75 and the average family size was 3.38.

In the CDP the population was spread out, with 31.8% under the age of 18, 10.2% from 18 to 24, 29.5% from 25 to 44, 18.6% from 45 to 64, and 9.8% who were 65 years of age or older. The median age was 31 years. For every 100 females, there were 84.6 males. For every 100 females age 18 and over, there were 83.7 males.

The median income for a household in the CDP was $45,750, and the median income for a family was $45,750. Males had a median income of $32,500 versus $24,333 for females. The per capita income for the CDP was $19,620. None of the families and 5.7% of the population were living below the poverty line.
