= Charles P. Murray Jr. =

United States Army officer

Charles Patrick Murray Jr.
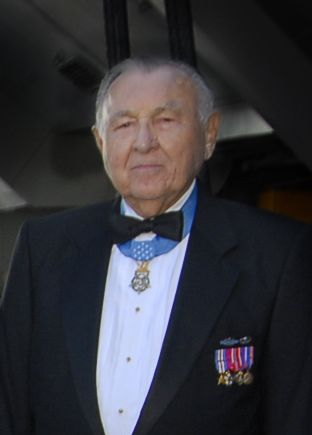
- Murray in 2008, attending the Change of Command Ceremony for then Lieutenant Colonel Ken Adgie, at Fort Stewart, GA
- Born: September 26, 1921; Baltimore, Maryland, U.S.
- Died: August 12, 2011 (aged 89); Columbia, South Carolina, U.S.
- Burial place: Arlington National Cemetery
- Military career
- Allegiance: United States of America
- Branch: United States Army
- Service years: 1942–1973
- Rank: Colonel
- Units: 1st Battalion, 30th Infantry Regiment
- Commands: 3rd US Infantry Regiment (The Old Guard)
- Conflicts: World War II; Korean War; Vietnam War
- Awards: Medal of Honor; Silver Star (3); Legion of Merit; Bronze Star with Valor device (2); Purple Heart

Charles Patrick Murray Jr. (September 26, 1921 – August 12, 2011) was a United States Army officer and a recipient of the United States military's highest decoration—the Medal of Honor—for his actions in World War II.

== Early life ==
Born on September 26, 1921, in Baltimore, Maryland, Murray moved to Wilmington, North Carolina, at age one. After graduating from Wilmington's New Hanover High School in 1938, he attended the University of North Carolina. He was drafted into the U.S. Army in 1942, after his third year of college.

== World War II ==
Arriving in northeastern France in October 1944, Murray was assigned as a replacement platoon leader to Company C of the 30th Infantry Regiment, 3rd Infantry Division. The division had landed in Saint-Tropez on the southern coast of France months earlier and was pushing northward towards Germany. On December 8 of that year, Murray became company commander.

Early on December 16, Company C crossed the Weiss River in the northern Vosges Mountains and established a defensive position atop Hill 512, just south of the village of Kaysersberg. Later that morning, Murray, by then a first lieutenant, led a platoon-sized group on a reconnaissance mission to the southeast, towards Ammerschwihr. Descending the vineyard-covered hill along a winding footpath, the group noticed German soldiers in a sunken road, about 150 yards (140 m) away, firing on an American hilltop position. Creeping forward to a point from which he could see the German unit, about 200 men strong, Murray made a radio call for artillery support. When the artillery landed slightly off target, he attempted to call for a range correction but the radio went dead. Not wanting to send his patrol against the much larger German force, he retrieved rifle grenades from his men and returned to his vantage point to begin a single-handed attack on the position. Although his fire alerted the Germans to his location, he continued to shoot grenades and later an automatic rifle into the German unit. As the soldiers attempted to withdraw, he disabled a truck which was carrying out three mortars. Members of his patrol brought up their own mortar, and Murray directed its fire until the Germans had scattered towards Ammerschwihr.

Continuing on the footpath, he and his men captured ten German soldiers. An eleventh soldier approached him with his helmet off and his arms raised. When Murray turned to shout orders, the soldier tossed a grenade; the explosion knocked Murray to the ground and sent eight pieces of shrapnel into his left leg. After getting back to his feet, he stopped his men from killing the prisoner. Only after organizing the patrol into a defensive position did he turn over command of the company and find an aid station.

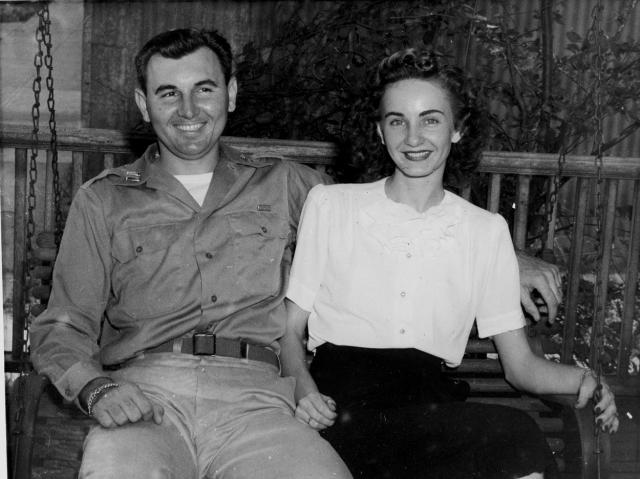
Murray with his wife Anne after returning from Europe in September 1945

After receiving medical treatment, Murray rejoined his unit on December 28, 1944. He learned that he had been recommended for the Medal of Honor in March of the next year and, per Army policy, was soon removed from combat. He remained with his division and was in Salzburg, Austria, on May 7, 1945, when a ceasefire was declared. The next day, Germany's surrender was finalized and the war in Europe was over.

Murray was issued the Medal of Honor on August 1, 1945, eight months after the fight near Kaysersberg. It was formally presented to him during a ceremony at the Salzburg airport on July 5, 1945, when he received the nation's highest honor for valor from Army Lt. Gen. Geoffrey Keyes, II Corp commanding general, with the entire 3rd Infantry Division in attendance.

He arrived home in Wilmington in September to a hero's welcome, although later returned to Europe and served four years of occupation duty. During this time, he was stationed in Salzburg and became the head U.S. intelligence officer in that city.

In addition to the Medal of Honor, Murray received three Silver Stars, two Bronze Stars with 'V' for Valor devices, a Purple Heart, and the Combat Infantryman Badge for his World War II service.

== Later life ==
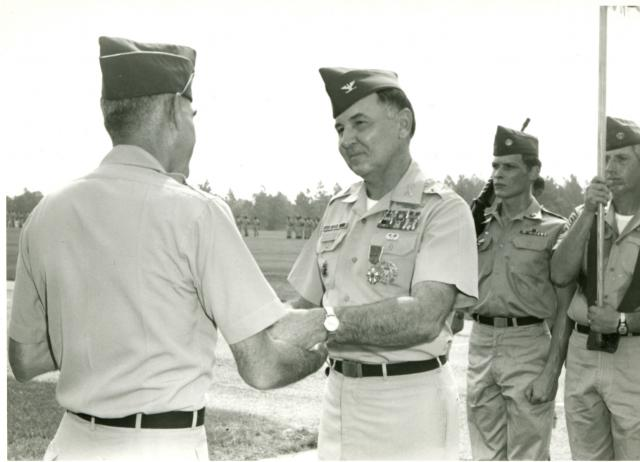
Murray being congratulated at his military retirement ceremony at Fort Jackson on July 30, 1973

Murray remained in the Army after World War II, serving with the 82nd Airborne Division and participating in the Korean and Vietnam Wars. He eventually rose to the rank of colonel and commanded the 3rd US Infantry Regiment (The Old Guard), a ceremonial unit tasked with guarding the Tomb of the Unknowns, among other duties. In 1970, he transferred to Fort Jackson in Columbia, South Carolina, from where he retired in 1973.

As a civilian, Murray worked for the South Carolina Department of Corrections until his final retirement. He and his wife, Anne, lived in Columbia, South Carolina until his death from congestive heart failure on August 12, 2011. Murray Middle School in Wilmington is named in his honor.

== Medal of Honor citation ==
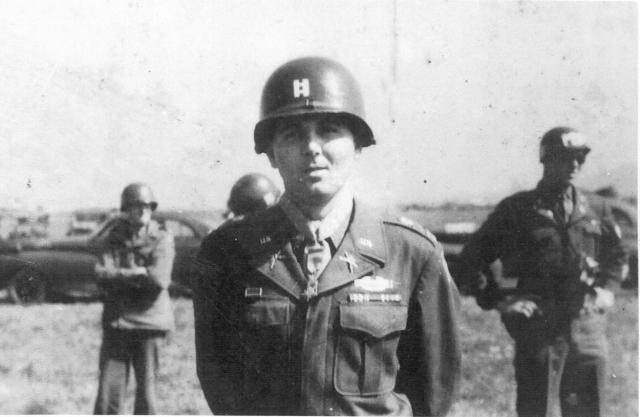
Murray after being presented with the Medal of Honor on July 5, 1945

Murray's official Medal of Honor citation reads:

For commanding Company C, 30th Infantry, displaying supreme courage and heroic initiative near Kaysersberg, France, on 16 December 1944, while leading a reinforced platoon into enemy territory. Descending into a valley beneath hilltop positions held by our troops, he observed a force of 200 Germans pouring deadly mortar, bazooka, machinegun, and small arms fire into an American battalion occupying the crest of the ridge. The enemy's position in a sunken road, though hidden from the ridge, was open to a flank attack by 1st Lt. Murray's patrol but he hesitated to commit so small a force to battle with the superior and strongly disposed enemy. Crawling out ahead of his troops to a vantage point, he called by radio for artillery fire. His shells bracketed the German force, but when he was about to correct the range his radio went dead. He returned to his patrol, secured grenades and a rifle to launch them and went back to his self-appointed outpost. His first shots disclosed his position; the enemy directed heavy fire against him as he methodically fired his missiles into the narrow defile. Again he returned to his patrol. With an automatic rifle and ammunition, he once more moved to his exposed position. Burst after burst he fired into the enemy, killing 20, wounding many others, and completely disorganizing its ranks, which began to withdraw. He prevented the removal of 3 German mortars by knocking out a truck. By that time a mortar had been brought to his support. 1st Lt. Murray directed fire of this weapon, causing further casualties and confusion in the German ranks. Calling on his patrol to follow, he then moved out toward his original objective, possession of a bridge and construction of a roadblock. He captured 10 Germans in foxholes. An eleventh, while pretending to surrender, threw a grenade which knocked him to the ground, inflicting 8 wounds. Though suffering and bleeding profusely, he refused to return to the rear until he had chosen the spot for the block and had seen his men correctly deployed. By his single-handed attack on an overwhelming force and by his intrepid and heroic fighting, 1st Lt. Murray stopped a counterattack, established an advance position against formidable odds, and provided an inspiring example for the men of his command.

== Awards and decorations ==

Badge	Combat Infantryman Badge with Star denoting 2nd award		
1st row	Medal of Honor		
2nd row	Silver Star with 2 Oak leaf clusters	Legion of Merit with 2 Oak leaf clusters	Bronze Star Medal with "V" Device and 1 Oak leaf cluster
3rd row	Purple Heart	Air Medal	Army Commendation Medal
4th row	American Campaign Medal	European-African-Middle Eastern Campaign Medal with 3 Campaign stars	World War II Victory Medal
5th row	Army of Occupation Medal with 'Germany' Clasp	National Defense Service Medal with 1 Oak leaf cluster	Vietnam Service Medal with 2 Campaign stars
6th row	Croix de Guerre with Silver Star	Republic of Vietnam Gallantry Cross with Bronze Star	Vietnam Campaign Medal
Badge	Parachutist Badge		
Unit awards	Presidential Unit Citation with 1 Oak leaf cluster		Republic of Vietnam Gallantry Cross with Palm

== Burial at Arlington National Cemetery on 9 Sep 2011 ==
https://archive.today/20130415134640/http://www.patriotguard.org/Forums/tabid/61/postid/1626878/view/topic/Default.aspx

Following his death in 2011, Murray was laid to rest in Arlington National Cemetery. His grave is in Section 60.

== See also ==
- List of Medal of Honor recipients
