= South Main Street District (Middletown, Ohio) =

Historic district in Ohio, United States

- U.S. National Register of Historic Places
- U.S. Historic district
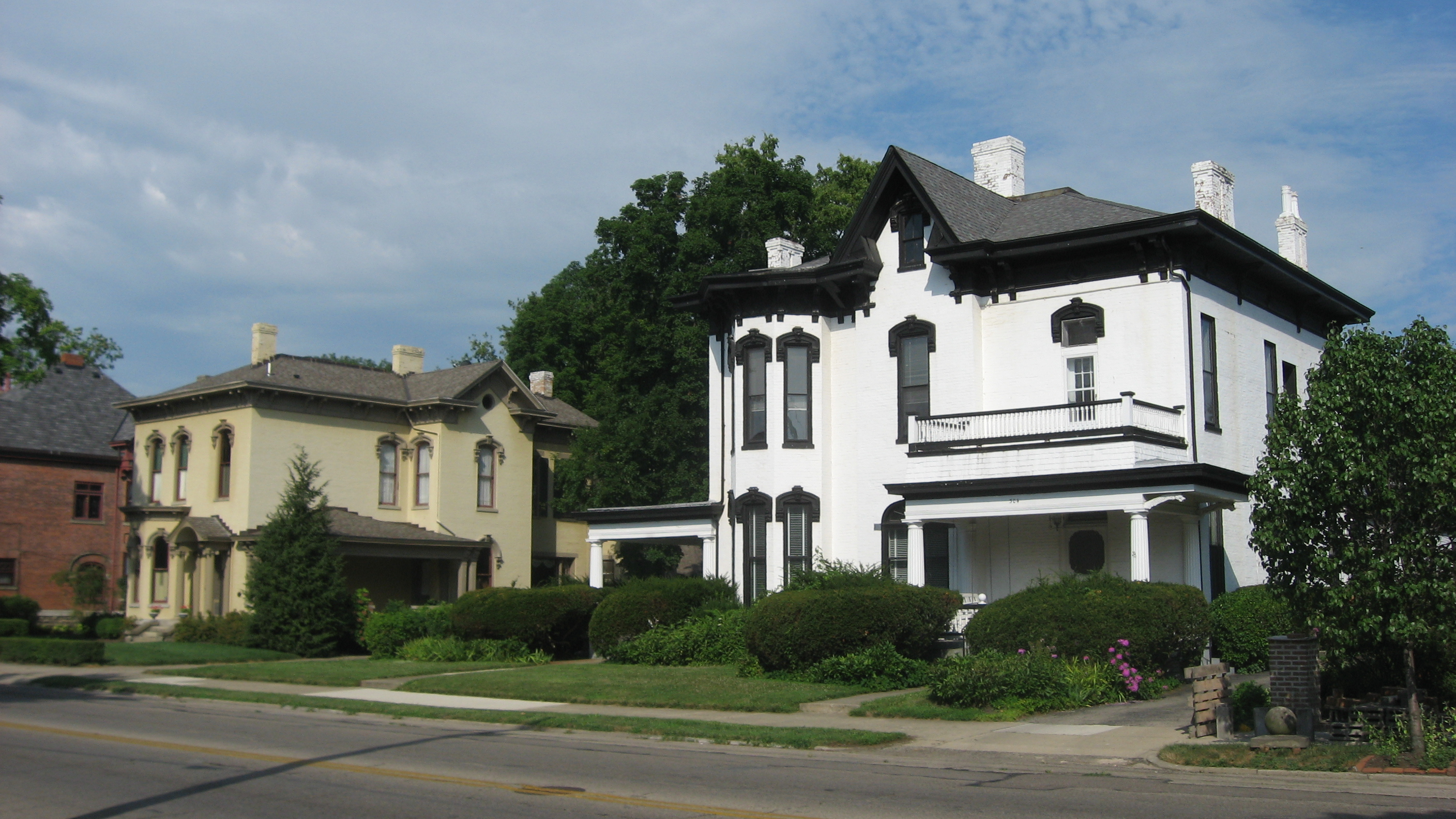
- Houses in the 300 block of South Main

- Location within Ohio Location within the United States
- Location: S. Main St., Middletown, Ohio
- Coordinates: 39°30′45″N 84°24′33″W
- Area: 40.5 acres (16.4 ha)
- Architectural style: Greek Revival, Italianate, Queen Anne
- NRHP reference No.: 78002015
- Added to NRHP: March 21, 1978

South Main Street District is a historic district in Middletown, Ohio.

It contains 76 contributing buildings, including single-dwelling, professional, and specialty store uses.

The district was listed in the National Register of Historic Places in 1974. It includes the John B. Tytus House, which is a National Historic Landmark.
