= Harold O. Messerschmidt =

United States Army soldier

- Born: October 20, 1923; Grier City, Pennsylvania, US
- Died: September 17, 1944 (aged 20) near Raddon-et-Chapendu, France
- Burial place: Christ Church Cemetery, Barnesville, Pennsylvania
- Military career
- Allegiance: United States
- Branch: United States Army
- Service years: 1943–1944
- Rank: Sergeant
- Units: 30th Infantry Regiment, 3rd Infantry Division
- Conflicts: World War II
- Awards: Medal of Honor

Harold O. Messerschmidt (October 20, 1923 – September 17, 1944) was a United States Army soldier and a recipient of the United States military's highest decoration—the Medal of Honor—for his actions in World War II.

Messerschmidt joined the Army from Chester, Pennsylvania in May 1943, and by September 17, 1944, was serving as a Sergeant in Company L, 30th Infantry Regiment, 3rd Infantry Division. During a German attack on that day, near Raddon-et-Chapendu, France, he led and encouraged his men until everyone in his unit had been killed or wounded. Ignoring his own wounds, he continued to fight the enemy force alone in hand to hand combat until he was killed. He was posthumously awarded the Medal of Honor ten months later, on July 17, 1946.

Messerschmidt, aged 20 at his death, was buried in Christ Lutheran Church Cemetery, Barnesville, Pennsylvania.

== Medal of Honor citation ==
Sergeant Messerschmidt's official Medal of Honor citation reads:

He displayed conspicuous gallantry and intrepidity above and beyond the call of duty. Braving machinegun, machine pistol, and rifle fire, he moved fearlessly and calmly from man to man along his 40-yard squad front, encouraging each to hold against the overwhelming assault of a fanatical foe surging up the hillside. Knocked to the ground by a burst from an enemy automatic weapon, he immediately jumped to his feet, and ignoring his grave wounds, fired his submachine gun at the enemy that was now upon them, killing 5 and wounding many others before his ammunition was spent. Virtually surrounded by a frenzied foe and all of his squad now casualties, he elected to fight alone, using his empty submachine gun as a bludgeon against his assailants. Spotting 1 of the enemy about to kill a wounded comrade, he felled the German with a blow of his weapon. Seeing friendly reinforcements running up the hill, he continued furiously to wield his empty gun against the foe in a new attack, and it was thus that he made the supreme sacrifice. Sgt. Messerschmidt's sustained heroism in hand-to-hand combat with superior enemy forces was in keeping with the highest traditions of the military service.

== Awards and decorations ==

Badge	Combat Infantryman Badge		
1st row	Medal of Honor		
2nd row	Bronze Star Medal	Purple Heart	Army Good Conduct Medal
3rd row	American Campaign Medal	European–African–Middle Eastern Campaign Medal with 1 campaign star	World War II Victory Medal
