= Middletown, Ohio =

City in Ohio, US

- City
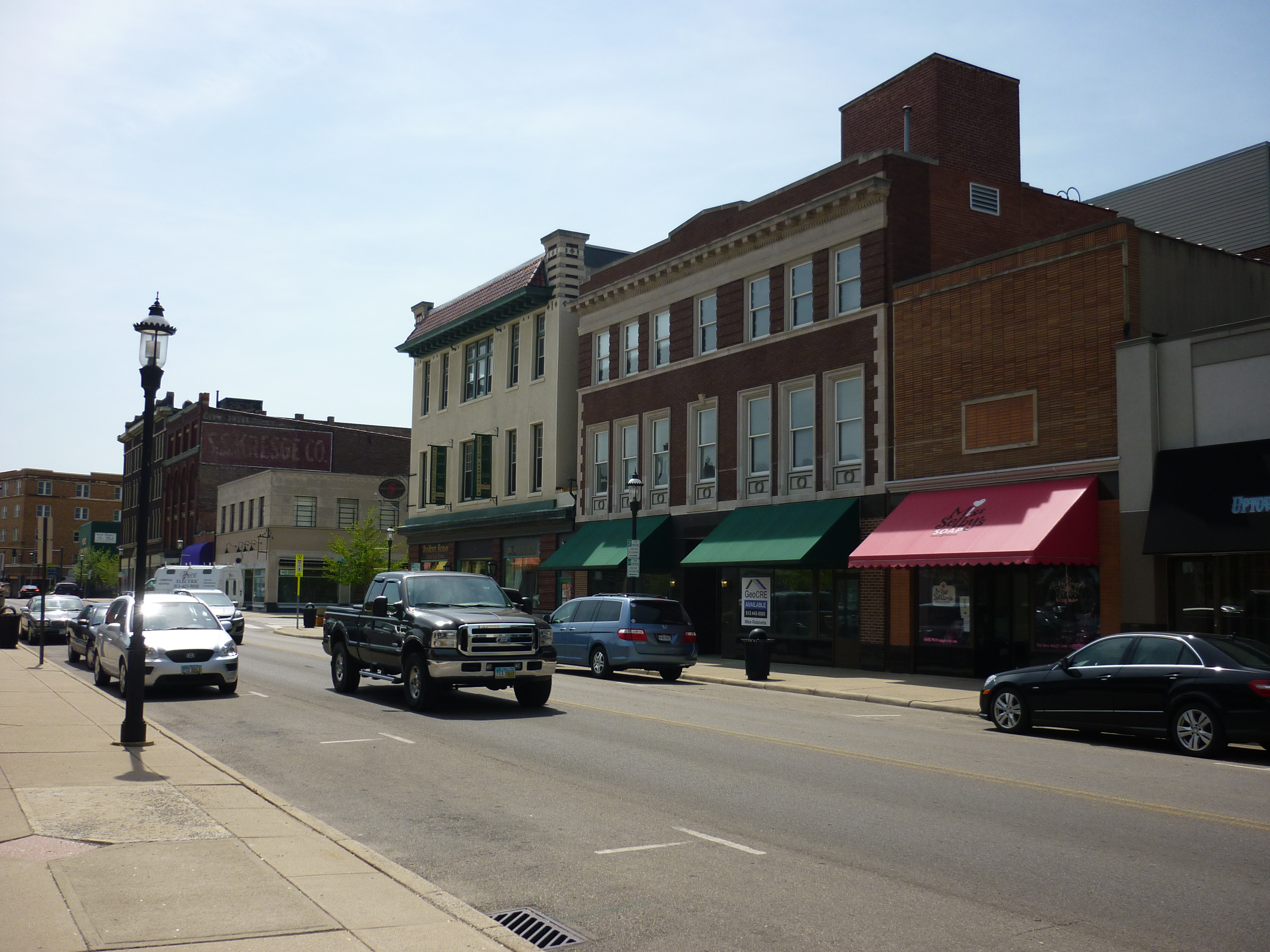
- Downtown Middletown

- Flag Seal Logo
- Motto(s): "Bright past, even brighter future"
- Interactive map of Middletown, Ohio
- Location within Ohio Location within the United States
- Coordinates: 39°30′12″N 84°21′57″W
- Country: United States
- State: Ohio
- Counties: Butler, Warren
- Incorporated: February 11, 1833

Government
  - Mayor: Elizabeth Slamka

Area
  - Total: 26.46 sq mi (68.54 km^{2})
  - Land: 26.14 sq mi (67.70 km^{2})
  - Water: 0.32 sq mi (0.84 km^{2})
- Elevation: 742 ft (226 m)

Population (2020)
  - Total: 50,987
  - Density: 1,950.6/sq mi (753.13/km^{2})
- Time zone: UTC-5 (Eastern (EST))
  - Summer (DST): UTC-4 (EDT)
- ZIP Codes: 45042-45044
- Area code: 513
- FIPS code: 39-49840
- GNIS feature ID: 1085814
- Website: cityofmiddletown.org

Middletown is a city in Butler and Warren counties in the U.S. state of Ohio. The population was 50,987 at the 2020 census. It is part of the Cincinnati metropolitan area in southwest Ohio, 29 miles (47 km) northeast of Cincinnati and 20 miles (32 km) southwest of Dayton.

Incorporated in 1833 and designated a city in 1886, Middletown was formed from parts of Lemon, Turtlecreek, and Franklin townships. It was home to AK Steel Holding Corporation, formerly known as Armco and founded in 1900, whose steel factory in Middletown still operates as part of Cleveland-Cliffs. The city also features Hook Field Municipal Airport, now serving only general aviation, and a regional campus of Miami University. In 1957, Middletown was named an All-America City.

== History ==
Middletown is mostly part of the 1788 Symmes Purchase of 311,682 acres (487.003 sq mi; 1,261.33 km^{2}) purchased by Judge John Cleves Symmes of New Jersey in 1788 from the Continental Congress as part of the Land Ordinance of 1785.

Stephen Vail Jr. purchased land on the eastern bank of the Great Miami River from Symmes and platted 52 lots for the village in 1802. The purchase was complicated when it was discovered that Symmes did not own all the land thought to have been sold to Vail, and eventually, after Vail's death, the Ohio Supreme Court permitted the transactions to go through.

In 1825, construction of the Miami and Erie Canal occurred, linking Middletown to Toledo, Ohio on Lake Erie and Cincinnati, Ohio on the Ohio River. A 20 miles (32 km) branch called the Warren County Canal operated to Lebanon, Ohio from 1830 to 1852 when flooding on Shaker Run destroyed the branch. The Great Flood of 1913 destroyed most of the Miami and Erie in the area. The canal was paved over and became the Verity Parkway. In 1982, Middletown opened the Canal Museum to commemorate the events.

Middletown was served by the Baltimore and Ohio Railroad, Cleveland, Cincinnati, Chicago and St. Louis Railway, Erie Railroad and Pennsylvania Railroad.

Middletown was principally known for its agriculture and paper mills but became most famous as a steel town when George Verity, founder of American Rolling Mill Company (ARMCO), opened a sheet steel rolling process plant in 1900.

In 1977, Towne Mall Galleria opened.

=== Etymology ===
The city's name is believed to have been given by its founder, Stephen Vail, but questions remain unanswered as to why. One local historian stated that the city received its name because Vail had come from Middletown, New Jersey. Another writer believed that the city was named Middletown because it was the midway point of navigation on the Great Miami River, which was then considered a navigable stream. Another theory is credited to the city being roughly halfway between Dayton and Cincinnati. Vail centered the city in Fractional Section 28 of Town 2, Range 4 North. One of the first settlers in Middletown was Daniel Doty, who migrated there from New Jersey in the late 18th century.

== Geography ==
According to the United States Census Bureau, the city has a total area of 26.43 square miles (68.45 km^{2}), of which 26.19 square miles (67.83 km^{2}) is land and 0.24 square miles (0.62 km^{2}) is water.

Middletown adjoins the Great Miami River. Middletown also borders the cities of Franklin, Monroe, Trenton, and Liberty and Madison Townships.

== Demographics ==
Historical population
Census	Pop.	Note	%±
1820	314		—
1840	809		—
1850	1,087		34.4%
1860	2,070		90.4%
1870	3,046		47.1%
1880	4,538		49.0%
1890	7,681		69.3%
1900	9,215		20.0%
1910	13,152		42.7%
1920	23,584		79.3%
1930	29,992		27.2%
1940	31,220		4.1%
1950	33,695		7.9%
1960	42,115		25.0%
1970	48,767		15.8%
1980	43,719		−10.4%
1990	46,758		7.0%
2000	51,605		10.4%
2010	48,694		−5.6%
2020	50,987		4.7%

=== Racial and ethnic composition ===
Middletown city, Ohio – Racial and ethnic composition Note: the US Census treats Hispanic/Latino as an ethnic category. This table excludes Latinos from the racial categories and assigns them to a separate category. Hispanics/Latinos may be of any race.
Race / Ethnicity (NH = Non-Hispanic)	Pop 2000	Pop 2010	Pop 2020	% 2000	% 2010	% 2020
White alone (NH)	44,658	39,678	36,781	86.54%	81.48%	72.14%
Black or African American alone (NH)	5,447	5,556	6,295	10.56%	11.41%	12.35%
Native American or Alaska Native alone (NH)	109	97	94	0.21%	0.20%	0.18%
Asian alone (NH)	186	228	469	0.36%	0.47%	0.92%
Native Hawaiian or Pacific Islander alone (NH)	13	20	46	0.03%	0.04%	0.09%
Other race alone (NH)	55	87	250	0.11%	0.18%	0.49%
Mixed race or Multiracial (NH)	677	1,190	2,927	1.31%	2.44%	5.74%
Hispanic or Latino (any race)	460	1,838	4,125	0.89%	3.77%	8.09%
Total	51,605	48,694	50,987	100.00%	100.00%	100.00%

=== 2020 census ===
As of the 2020 census, Middletown had a population of 50,987. The median age was 38.0 years, with 23.2% of residents under the age of 18 and 16.7% of residents 65 years of age or older. For every 100 females there were 93.6 males, and for every 100 females age 18 and over there were 90.8 males age 18 and over.

There were 21,164 households in Middletown, of which 27.8% had children under the age of 18 living in them. Of all households, 34.6% were married-couple households, 21.9% were households with a male householder and no spouse or partner present, and 32.9% were households with a female householder and no spouse or partner present. About 32.4% of all households were made up of individuals and 12.5% had someone living alone who was 65 years of age or older.

There were 23,007 housing units, of which 8.0% were vacant. The homeowner vacancy rate was 1.8% and the rental vacancy rate was 6.9%.

99.6% of residents lived in urban areas, while 0.4% lived in rural areas.

Racial composition as of the 2020 census
Race	Number	Percent
White	37,590	73.7%
Black or African American	6,495	12.7%
American Indian and Alaska Native	163	0.3%
Asian	475	0.9%
Native Hawaiian and Other Pacific Islander	46	0.1%
Some other race	2,150	4.2%
Two or more races	4,068	8.0%

=== 2010 census ===
As of the census of 2010, there were 48,694 people, 20,238 households, and 12,505 families living in the city. The population density was 1,859.3 inhabitants per square mile (717.9/km^{2}). There were 23,296 housing units at an average density of 889.5 per square mile (343.4/km^{2}). The racial makeup of the city was 83.3% White, 11.7% African American, 0.2% Native American, 0.5% Asian, 1.6% from other races, and 2.7% from two or more races. Hispanic or Latino of any race were 3.8% of the population.

There were 20,238 households, of which 31.0% had children under the age of 18 living with them, 37.9% were married couples living together, 18.1% had a female householder with no husband present, 5.8% had a male householder with no wife present, and 38.2% were non-families. 31.5% of all households were made up of individuals, and 11.9% had someone living alone who was 65 years of age or older. The average household size was 2.38 and the average family size was 2.97.

The median age in the city was 38.3 years. 24.3% of residents were under the age of 18; 9% were between the ages of 18 and 24; 24.7% were from 25 to 44; 27.1% were from 45 to 64; and 14.9% were 65 years of age or older. The gender makeup of the city was 47.5% male and 52.5% female.

=== 2000 census ===
As of the census of 2000, there were 51,605 people, 21,469 households, and 13,933 families living in the city. The population density was 2,011.4 inhabitants per square mile (776.6/km^{2}). There were 23,144 housing units at an average density of 902.1 per square mile (348.3/km^{2}). The racial makeup of the city was 86.98% White, 10.59% African American, 0.25% Native American, 0.37% Asian, 0.03% Pacific Islander, 0.36% from other races, and 1.42% from two or more races. Hispanic or Latino of any race were 0.89% of the population.

There were 21,469 households, out of which 29.9% had children under the age of 18 living with them, 45.9% were married couples living together, 14.6% had a female householder with no husband present, and 35.1% were non-families. 29.6% of all households were made up of individuals, and 11.4% had someone living alone who was 65 years of age or older. The average household size was 2.38 and the average family size was 2.94.

In the city, the population was spread out, with 25.0% under the age of 18, 9.3% from 18 to 24, 29.2% from 25 to 44, 21.6% from 45 to 64, and 14.9% who were 65 years of age or older. The median age was 36 years. For every 100 females, there were 91.4 males. For every 100 females age 18 and over, there were 87.3 males.

The median income for a household in the city was $36,215, and the median income for a family was $43,867. Males had a median income of $35,705 versus $23,865 for females. The per capita income for the city was $19,773. About 9.2% of families and 12.6% of the population were below the poverty line, including 18.4% of those under age 18 and 9.4% of those age 65 or over.

== Arts and culture ==
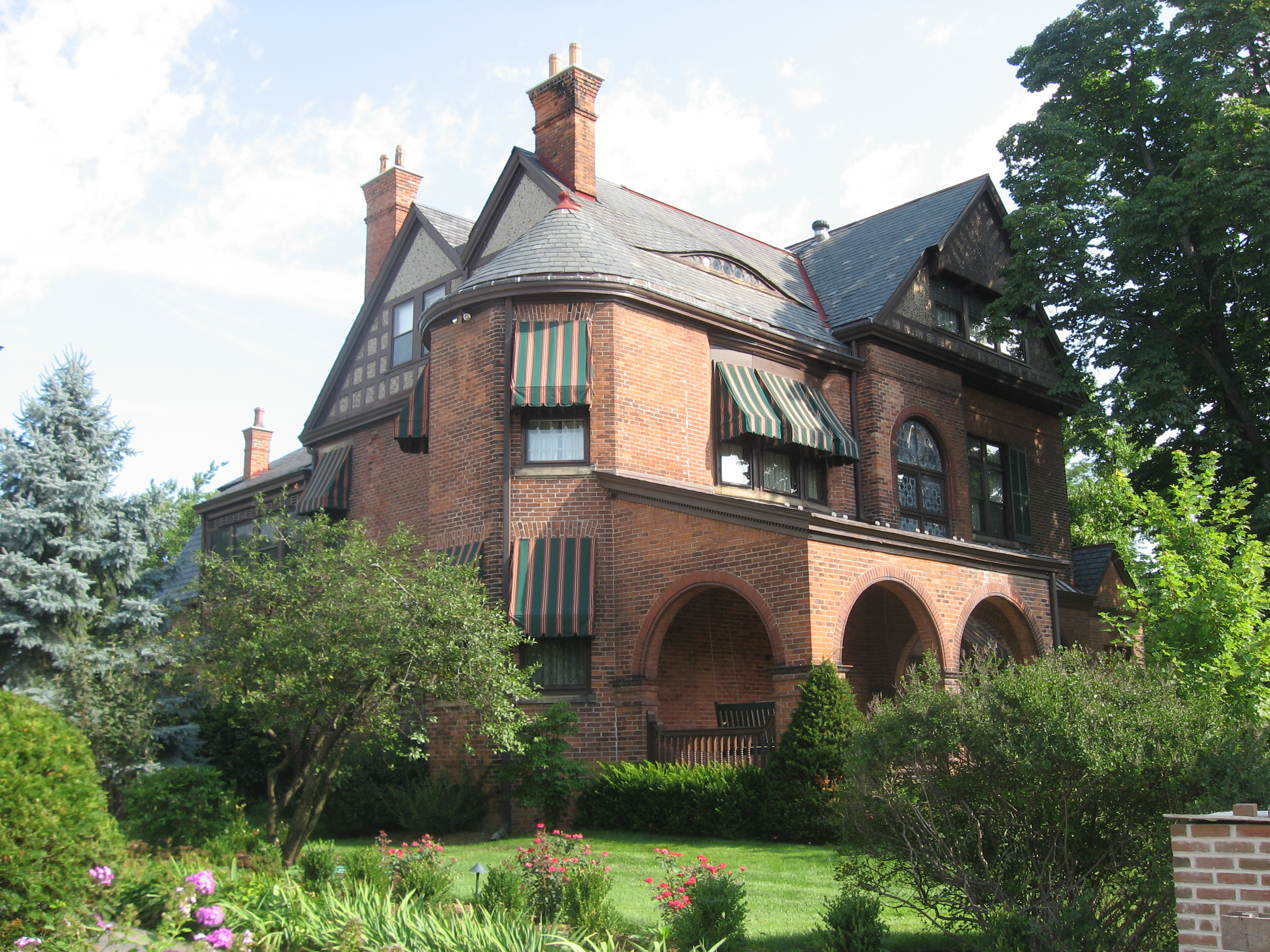
John B. Tytus House

Sites in Middletown included on the National Register of Historic Places include the South Main Street District and the John B. Tytus House.

== Education ==
In Butler County, all sections of Middletown are in the Middletown City School District. The Middletown City district operates Middletown High School. The Warren County portion is divided among several school districts, with one of them being the Middletown City District, and the others being Franklin City School District and Lebanon City School District.

Miami University, based in Oxford, Ohio, has a regional campus in Middletown. Miami University Middletown opened in 1966 as the first satellite campus in Ohio. It has an annual enrollment of approximately 1,500 students.

== Infrastructure ==
=== Transportation ===
The Middletown Regional Airport is located two nautical miles (2.3 mi; 3.7 km) north of Middletown's central business district.

Ohio State Route 4 runs north–south through Middletown. Ohio State Route 73 and Ohio State Route 122 run east–west through the city. Ohio State Route 122 accesses Interstate 75 running to the east of Middletown.

Middletown had multiple railroad stations serving the different railroads running through the city, Baltimore and Ohio, Erie Railroad, New York Central (earlier, the Cleveland, Cincinnati, Chicago and St. Louis Railway) and Pennsylvania Railroad. The last passenger trains were the Baltimore and Ohio's Cincinnatian and Penn Central's Cincinnati-Columbus train, both ending in 1971.

Transit service was formerly provided by the privately owned Ortman-Stewart Transportation Company, which ceased operations at the end of 1972. Today, the Butler County Regional Transit Authority provides bus service in the city with connections to Hamilton, Oxford, as well as Springdale, where riders can transfer to the Southwest Ohio Regional Transit Authority serving greater Cincinnati.

== Notable people ==
- Steve Baumann, soccer player
- Todd Bell, NFL safety
- Gay Brewer, professional golfer
- James E. Campbell, 38th governor of Ohio
- Butch Carter, NBA player and coach; brother of Cris
- Cris Carter, Hall of Fame NFL player
- Melville Collins, actor, composer, pianist, and baritone
- Dan Daub, MLB pitcher
- Brooklyn Decker, fashion model
- Shaun Foist, drummer for Breaking Benjamin
- Goodwen, rock band
- William Gross, financier for Janus Capital Group and PIMCO
- Bill Hanzlik, basketball player and coach
- J. Eugene Harding, U.S. representative
- Kayla Harrison, two-time Olympic champion in judo
- Thomas Howard, former MLB player
- Howard Jones, Hall of Fame college football player and coach
- Patrick L. Kessler, Medal of Honor recipient
- Frank Lickliter, professional golfer on the PGA Tour
- Jerry Lucas, Ohio State and NBA basketball player
- Roy Lucas, American football coach
- Buz Lukens, U.S. Representative
- Jalin Marshall, professional football player
- McGuire Sisters, vocal trio
- Debra Monk, Tony and Emmy Award-winning actress
- Scott Nein, member of the Ohio Senate
- Clarence Page, columnist for the Chicago Tribune
- Susan Perkins, Miss America 1978
- Chrystee Pharris, television and film actress
- Rufus Phillips, politician and businessman
- Raven Riley, actress
- Gordon Ray Roberts, Medal of Honor recipient
- Charlie Root, MLB pitcher
- Josh Roush, Filmmaker
- Terry Rukavina, All-American Girls Professional Baseball League player
- Van Gordon Sauter, American Communications Executive
- Ed Schrock, U.S. representative
- Kyle Schwarber, MLB left fielder
- Sarah Selby, Radio, Movie, TV Actress
- Shepherd Sisters, vocal quartet
- Fannie Douglass Smith, journalist
- Paul J. Sorg, U.S. representative
- Ferdinand Van Derveer, brigadier general in the Civil War
- JD Vance, 50th and current vice president of the United States
- William Verity, Jr., 27th secretary of commerce between 1987 and 1989
- John M. Watson, Sr., trombonist and actor
- Virtue Hampton Whitted, jazz singer and bassist

== In popular culture ==
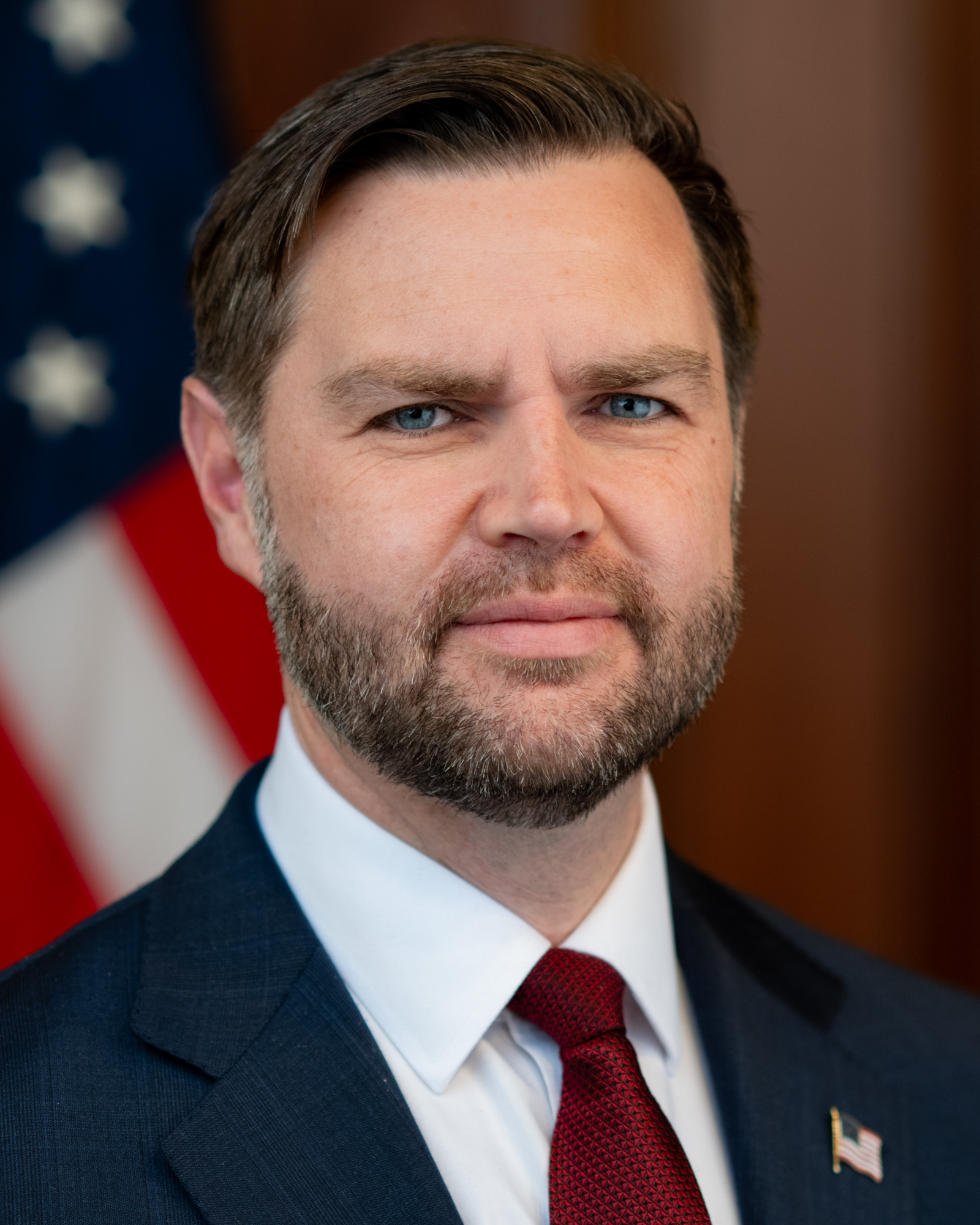
Vice President JD Vance

Vice President JD Vance describes his life in Middletown in Hillbilly Elegy: A Memoir of a Family and Culture in Crisis (2016). His family had moved there from Jackson, Kentucky, and became caught in the problems of industrial restructuring and loss of jobs.

== See also ==
- South Middletown, Ohio
