= Greek Expeditionary Force (Korea) =

Greek Expeditionary Force in Korea Εκστρατευτικόν Σώμα Ελλάδος στην Κορέα
- Shoulder patch of the GEF
- Active: 11 November 1950 – May 1958
- Country: Kingdom of Greece
- Allegiance: United Nations
- Branch: Hellenic Army; Hellenic Air Force
- Type: Reinforced Infantry battalion, later regiment Transport aircraft flight
- Part of: 15th Infantry Regiment; US 1st Cavalry Division; US 3rd Infantry Division
- Engagements: Korean War: Battle of Chosin Reservoir; First and Second Battles of Wonju; Battle of Outpost Harry
- Decorations: Commander's Cross of the Cross of Valour; 2 x Presidential Unit Citation (US); Presidential Unit Citation (ROK)

Commanders
- Notable commanders: Col. Ioannes Daskalopoulos; Lt. Col. Dionysios Arbouzis; Lt. Col. Georgios Koumanakos; Sq.Ldr. Georgios Pleionis

The Greek Expeditionary Force (GEF) in Korea (Greek: Εκστρατευτικόν Σώμα Ελλάδος; romanized: Ekstrateftikon Soma Ellados, abbreviated ΕΚΣΕ) was formed in response to the United Nations appeal for assistance in the Korean War. It comprised a reinforced Hellenic Army (HA) infantry battalion and the Royal Hellenic Air Force (RHAF) 13th flight of seven transport planes (C-47). Greece originally intended to send a brigade to Korea; upon consultation with the US, however, the expeditionary force was downgraded to a battalion attached to the US 1st Cavalry Division. The 13th Flight supported the US marine division and played an important role of evacuating the dead and the wounded. After the armistice, the RHAF unit withdrew in May 1955 and the HA unit in December 1955. Greece was the fifth largest troop contributor to U.N. Forces in Korea.

The Greek forces brought valuable combat experience from their war against communist guerrillas in Greece (see Greek Civil War) and they were also skilled in using American weapons. Having recently fought in the mountainous terrain of their homeland, they easily acclimated to the Korean topography, and the UN command was especially impressed by how quickly Greek troops were able to move.

A total of 10,255 Greek personnel were sent to Korea. 186 or 187 were killed in action and 617 wounded in action. The bodies of all Greek soldiers killed in the war have been returned to Greece.

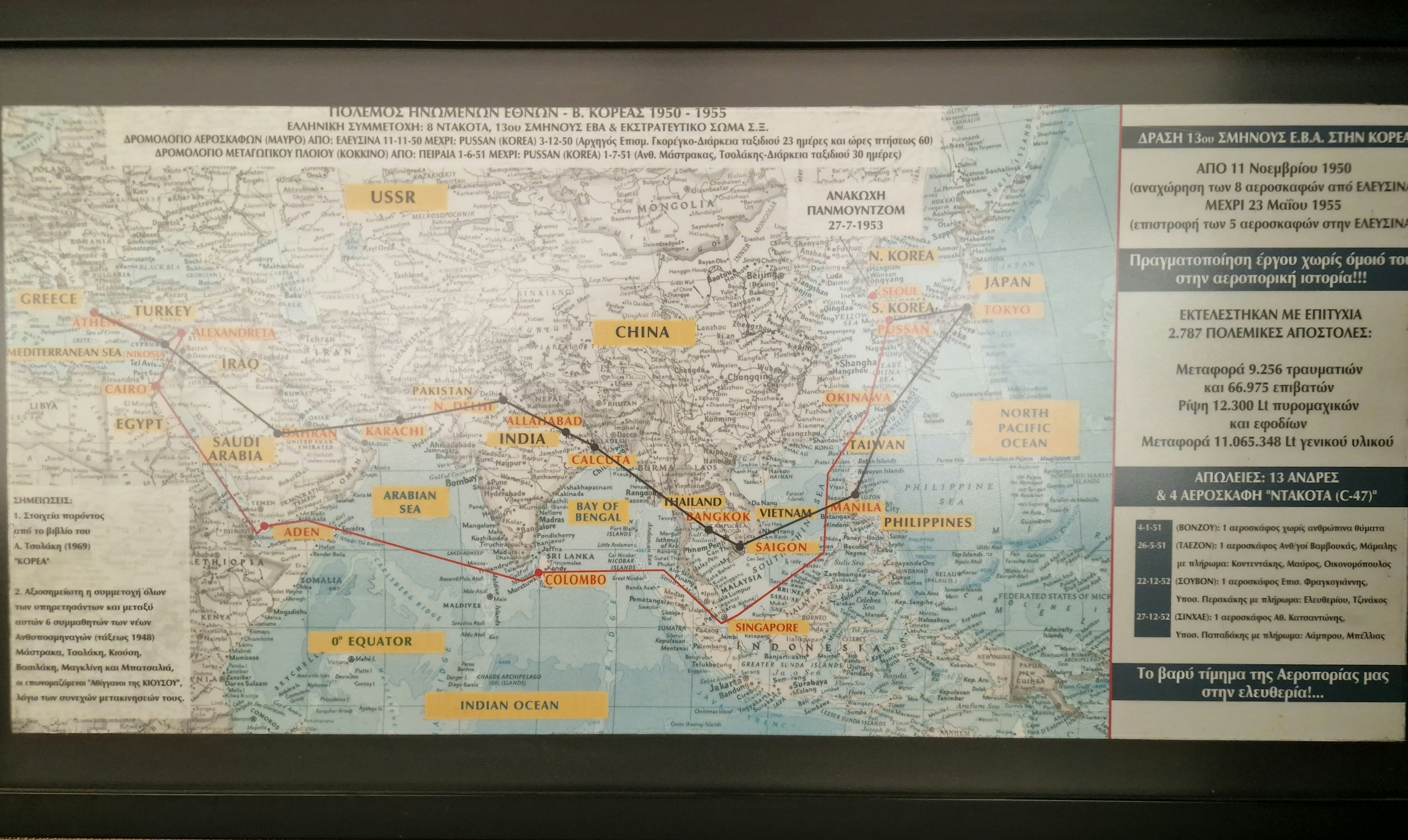
The trip of the Greek forces to Korea. The black line is the route of the Greek Airforce and the red line the route of the Greek transport ship with the ground forces.

== RHAF Transport Flight ==
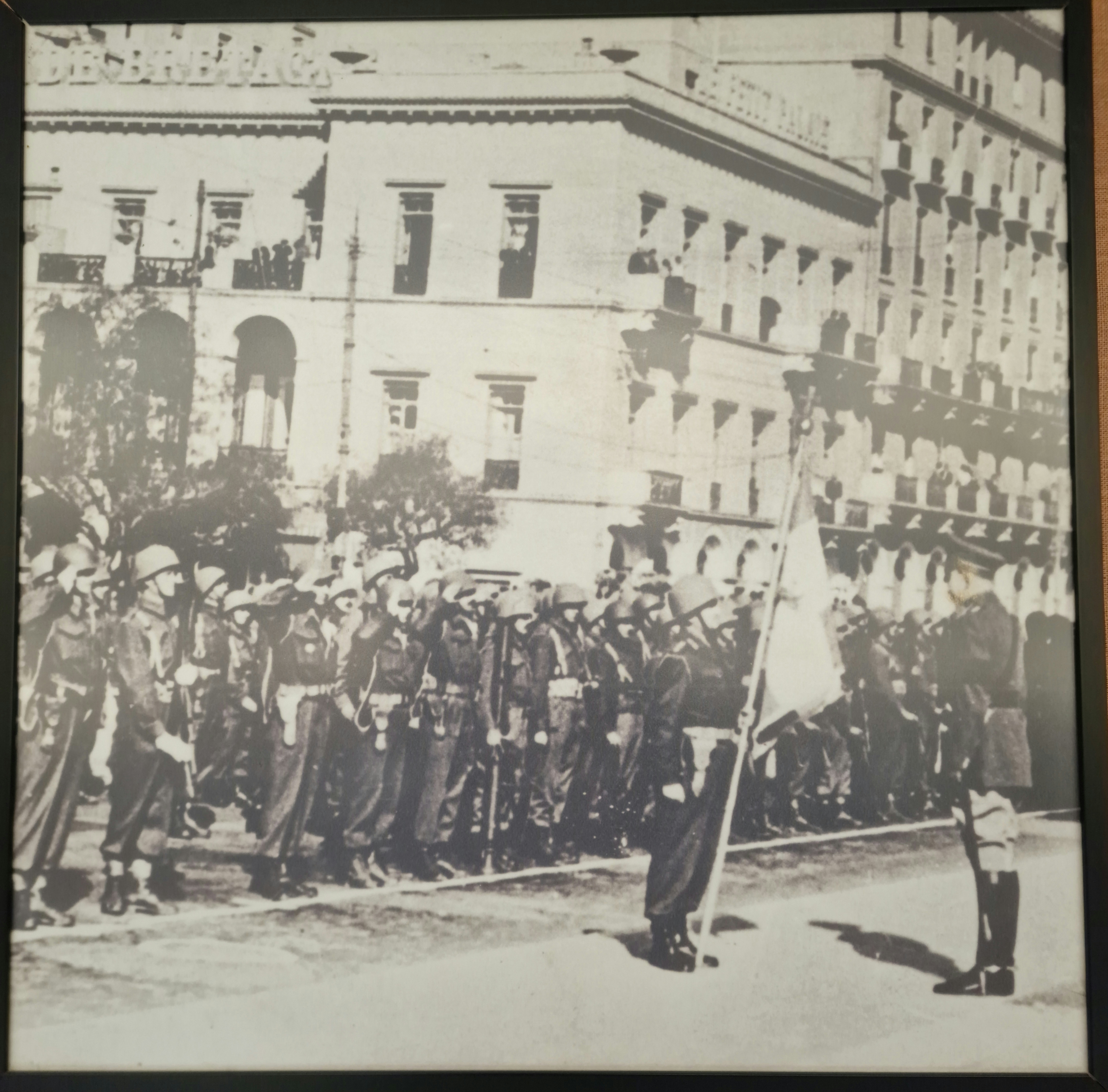
Colonel Ioannes Daskalopoulos receives the Greek war flag of the expeditionary corps from King Paul on the 14th of November 1950 at 11:00 EEST, before departing for Korea.

The seven C-47s of 13th Flight, with 67 Air Force officers and personnel, departed from Elefsis air base at 08:30 on November 11, 1950. They belonged to the 355 Transport Squadron, known for its participation in the recent civil war. The majority of the officers and NCOs of this first mission were experienced airmen, being veterans of the Mediterranean and Middle East Theatre of World War II and the Greek Civil War.

On December 1, 1950, they arrived in Japan and immediately attached to the 21st Troop Carrier Sqn. (later renamed 6461 TC Sqn.) of the 374th Wing, United States Air Force, based initially at Daegu, helping at the Battle of Chosin Reservoir.

From May 14, 1951, the flight was based at Kimpo air base where it remained until May 23, 1955. During its time in Korea, the Greek Flight carried out 2,916 missions, comprising air evacuations, the transport of personnel and prisoners, drops of supplies and ammunition, the replenishment of allied bases and the collection of operational information. In total, its planes carried 70,568 passengers, including 9,243 wounded. It logged 13,777 flight hours. Losses included 12 officers and NCOs and two C-47s.

== Sparta Battalion ==
The Greek government originally intended to send a brigade to Korea, but with quick UN victories in the autumn of 1950, the expeditionary force was downgraded to a reinforced infantry battalion. Later, the Greeks offered to send more troops, but Douglas MacArthur declined the offer since the UN forces were winning and thought that the war would be over soon. The army unit, called the Sparta Battalion, arrived in Busan on December 9, 1950, after a long voyage under Spartan Lieutenant Colonel Georgios Koumanakos, was composed of 849 men and six vehicles in an HQ company and three rifle companies; with one machine gun/mortar platoon and three rifle platoons in each. The men were all volunteers from the 1st, 8th and 9th Infantry Divisions. The unit's officers were selected based on their fluency in English.

Troops of the Greek Expeditionary Force during a military ceremony, in September 1952

From August 23, 1951, the component was expanded to 1,063 men, at which strength it remained until the December 1953 armistice. It was subsequently increased to the level of 2,163 men until April 1955. After the anti-Greek Istanbul Pogrom, in September 1955, relations with Greece's NATO ally, Turkey, deteriorated and Athens decided to recall its units stationed in Korea. As a result, only 191 men were still in the country by December 1955. A representative section of one officer and nine men remained until May 1958.

=== Battalion events timeline ===
- 1950
  - November 15: Embarkation at Piraeus.
  - December 9: Arrival at Busan.
  - December 16: Move to Suwon, attached to the US 1st Cavalry Division as the "4th Battalion (GEF), 7th Cavalry Regiment".
- 1951
  - January 16: Remnants sweeping operation at Wolaksan, Haseoksan, Munsusan and Sinseol summits.
  - January 29: Battle with 3,000 Chinese at Hill 381, west of Icheon.
  - February 8: Battle with the Chinese Army at Hill 489, north of Gonjiam-ri.
  - March 7: Attack on Hill 326, east of Yongdu-ri.
  - April 7: Advance to Geumhaksan, north of Hongchen.
  - April 27: Defence of Hongje-dong area of Seoul.
  - May 26: Advance to Imjingang via Nogosan and Gamaksan.
  - June 9: Advance to Wyoming line, north of Yeoncheon.
  - August 4: Battle with the Chinese Army near Churadong area.
  - September 26: Attack against the Chinese Army at the Big Nori Hill.
  - October 3–10: Battle with the Chinese Army at Hill 313 ("Scotch Hill"). The hill was captured on 5 October 5, with 28 KIA.
  - December 30: Deployed at Imjingang S-curved area.
- 1952
  - January: patrol duties attached to the 15th Infantry Regiment, US 3rd Infantry Division.
  - March 17: Battle over Kelly, Nori, Betty outposts.
  - May 23: The 1st company guards Kohe-do island prisoner camp.
  - July 23: Advance to Imjingang S-curved area again after improving the corps for four months.
  - August 7: Surprise attack on Hill 167 near Imjingang.
  - September 28: Battle with the Chinese Army near Nori Hill area.
  - October 29: Return to the US 9th corps, move to Cheolwon area.
  - December 14: Entice and destroy one Chinese company at Yujeong-ri.
  - December 27: 14 soldiers killed in a transport aircraft crash in Jinhae.
- 1953
  - March 11: Battle between reconnaissance squads at Hill 438.
  - May 16: Deployed at Junggasan, north eastern sides of Cheolwon.
  - June 16: Battle with the Chinese Army at Hill 420 (Outpost Harry).
  - July 16: Battle with the Chinese Army at Hill 495, south of Bukjeon-hyeon.
  - July 25: Battle with the Chinese Army at Hill 492, north of Seungam-ri.

=== Uniform of the Greek army force ===
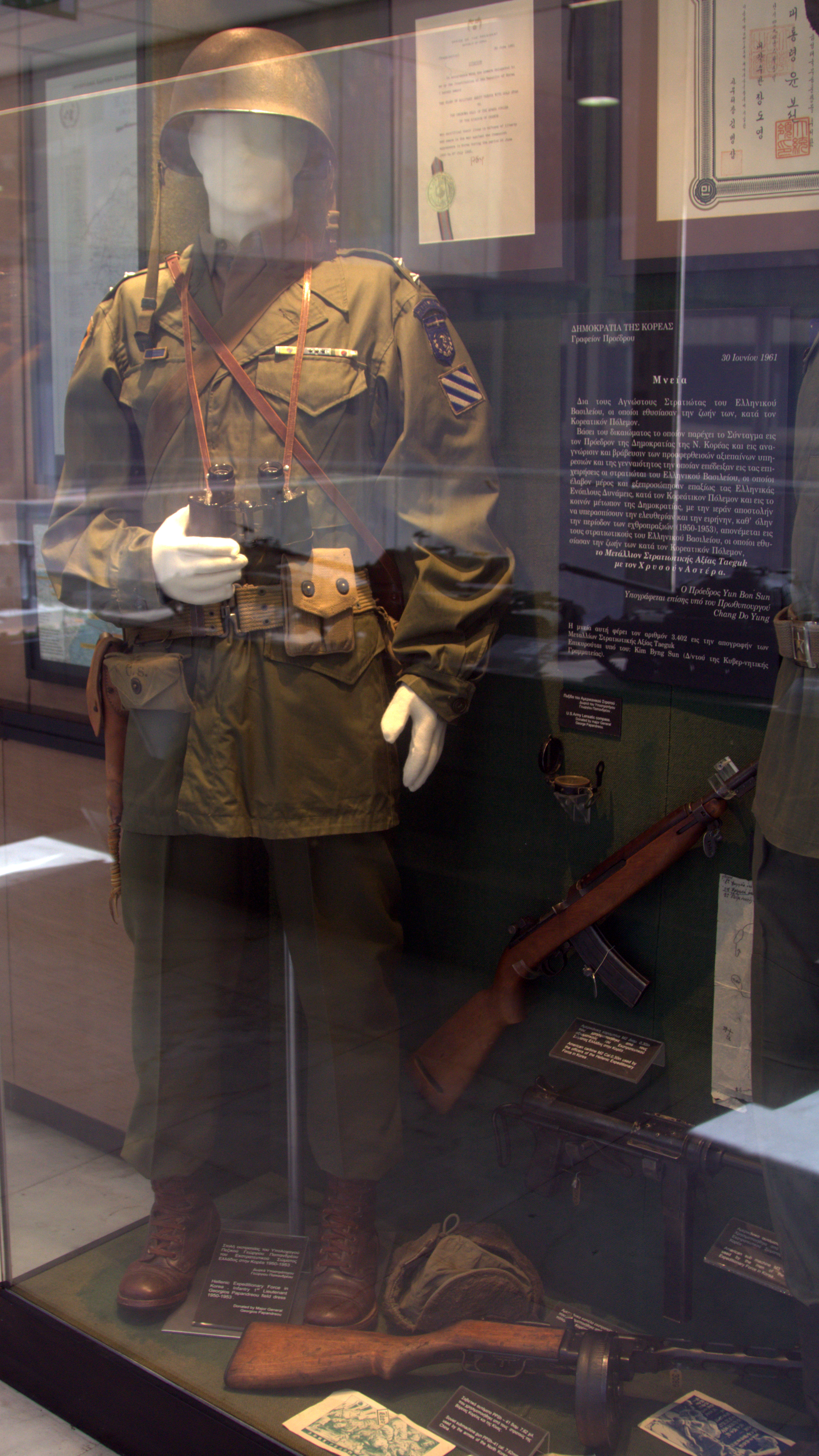
Uniform of the Greek expeditionary force uniform on display in the Athens War Museum

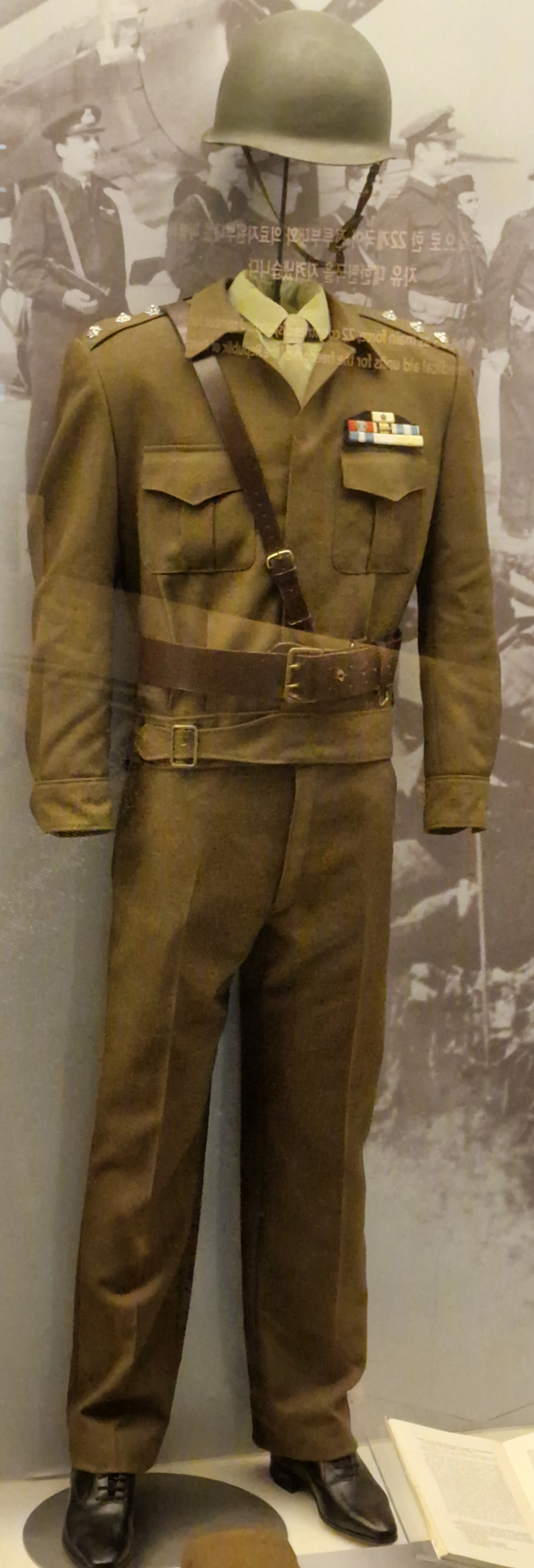
Uniform of the Greek expeditionary force on display in the War Memorial of Korea, Seoul

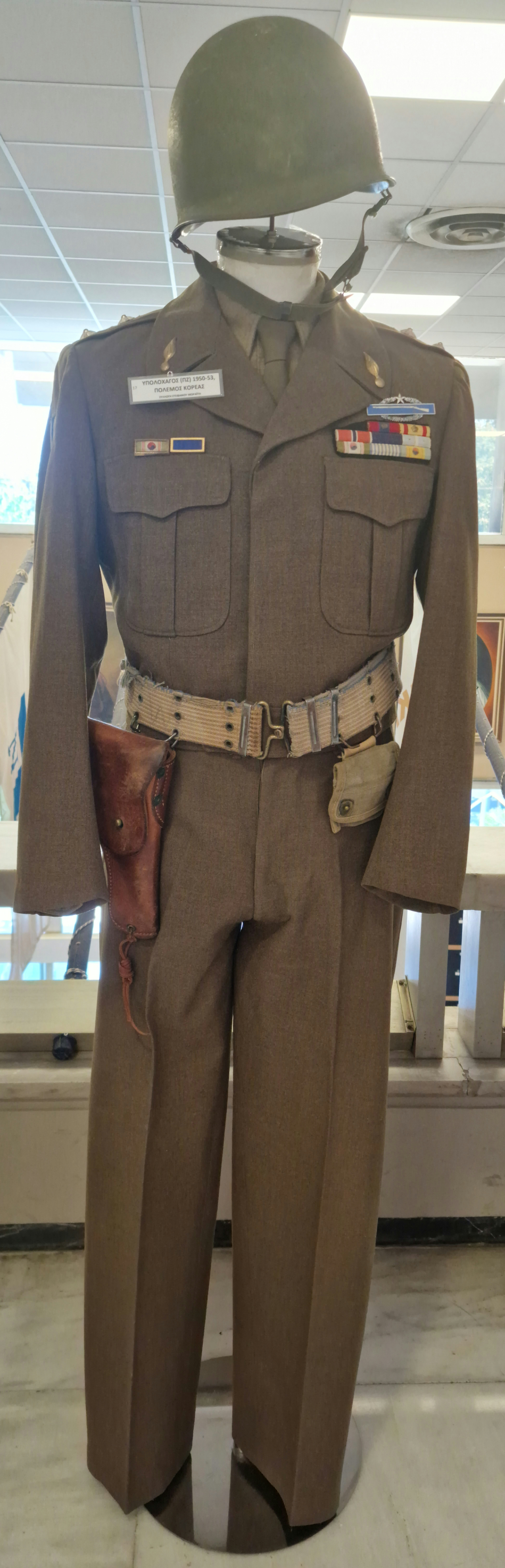
First Lieutenant uniform of the Greek expeditionary force on display in the Athens War Museum

== Awards and recognitions ==
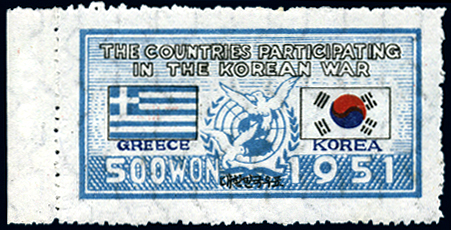
South Korean 500 won stamp of 1951 commemorating the role of the GEF during the Korean War

The 13th Flight received a US Presidential Unit Citation for its participation in the evacuation of US Marines at Hagaru-ri in December 1950. The GEF Spartan battalion received its first US Presidential Unit Citation in February 1952 for the capture of Scotch Hill.

- Republic of Korea Presidential Unit Citation (ROK)
- Presidential Unit Citation (USA)

The Greek infantry company involved in the defense of Outpost Harry received the following Presidential Unit Citation:

"DEPARTMENT OF THE ARMY Washington D. C., 10 March 1955 GENERAL ORDERS 18

DISTINGUISHED UNIT CITATION Company P Greek Expeditionary Forces Battalion (Second Award) is cited for extraordinary heroism and outstanding performance of duty in action against an armed enemy in the vicinity of Surang-Ni, Korea during the period June 17 to June 18, 1953. Assigned the defense of a vital outpost position (Harry), the company encountered a major enemy assault on the evening of June 17. After an intense concentration of enemy mortar and artillery fire, the hostile forces, which had taken up an attack position on the northeast and northwest side of the outpost, moved rapidly through their own and friendly artillery fire to gain a foothold on the northern slope of the position. Refusing to withdraw, Company P closed in and met the attackers in a furious hand-to-hand struggle in which many of the enemy were driven off. The aggressors regrouped, quickly attacked a second time, and again gained the friendly trenches. Immediately, the Greek Forces launched a series of counterattacks, simultaneously dispatching a diversionary force to the east of the outpost which successfully channeled the enemy thrusts. After two hours of close-in fighting, the aggressors were again routed and the friendly positions restored. The outstanding conduct and exemplary courage exhibited by members of Company P, Greek Expeditionary Forces Battalion, reflects great credit on themselves and are in keeping with the finest traditions of the military service and the Kingdom of Greece."

Individual Greeks received six U.S. Distinguished Service Crosses, 32 Silver Stars, 110 Bronze Stars. 19 members of 13th Flight received the US Air Force Air Medal for the Hagaru-ri evacuation operation in December 1950. The Greek battalion's war flag also received the highest Greek military decoration, the Commander's Cross of the Cross of Valour, in 1954.

== Helping Korean civilians ==
The Greeks were highly concerned with the wellbeing of the civilians and considered it a high priority. Of all the forces, they were possibly the most protective. They especially treated Korean children, many of whom were orphans, with great kindness, providing food, clothing and shelter, possibly because of the kidnapping of Greek children by Communists during the Greek civil war. They also aided other vulnerable civilians, offering whatever assistance they could. In addition, they built two villages to support the civilians, which they named Athens and Sparta. The villages were established in the area between Cheorwon and Wingzepu, approximately 20 kilometers north of Seoul.

== Religious work in South Korea ==
Greek military chaplains played a prime role in the preservation of the Korean Orthodox Church during the Korean War. This small religious body, founded by Russian Orthodox missionaries during the czarist era, had suffered persecution due to a series of historical developments -- the Japanese colonization of Korea, the rise of communism in Russia, World War II and the division of the Korean Peninsula. The Korean War added to the devastation. When Greek chaplains became aware of the Korean church, its flock had been scattered and its clergy were dead or presumed dead. The Greeks helped arrange ordination of new Korean clergy and eventually helped the church affiliate with an Orthodox bishop overseas. Today, the church has its own resident bishop and has thousands of members in South Korea.

== Memorials and Monuments ==
=== Korea ===
- In 1961 Greece installed a plaque at the United Nations Memorial Cemetery in Busan. The plaque reads “From Greece for her fallen sons in gratitude”. In addition, the names of the fallen Greeks are on the Wall of Remembrance and there is a plaque for Greece on the UN forces monument.
- At the UN veterans memorial in Busan, there is a Greek flag and a sculpture of a Greek soldier next to the flags and the soldiers of the other UN nations who helped South Korea.
- In 1974 South Korea raised a Greek War Memorial in Yeoju, with the names of the Greeks who were killed in the war engraved on it.
- At the Korea War Memorial in Seoul, there is a monument dedicated to Greece. In addition, the names of the Greeks who killed in action during the war are on the roll of honor and there is also a commemorative stele for Greece at the “Monument for the Participants” section.
- Inside the Statue of Brothers in Seoul, there is a plaque for Greece.

=== Greece ===
- On the Tomb of the Unknown Soldier in Athens the word "Korea" is engraved on the tomb in order to honor the men who were killed during the war.
- A Monument in the Athens War Museum.
- A Monument in Thessaloniki's waterfront.

=== In the Athens War Museum ===
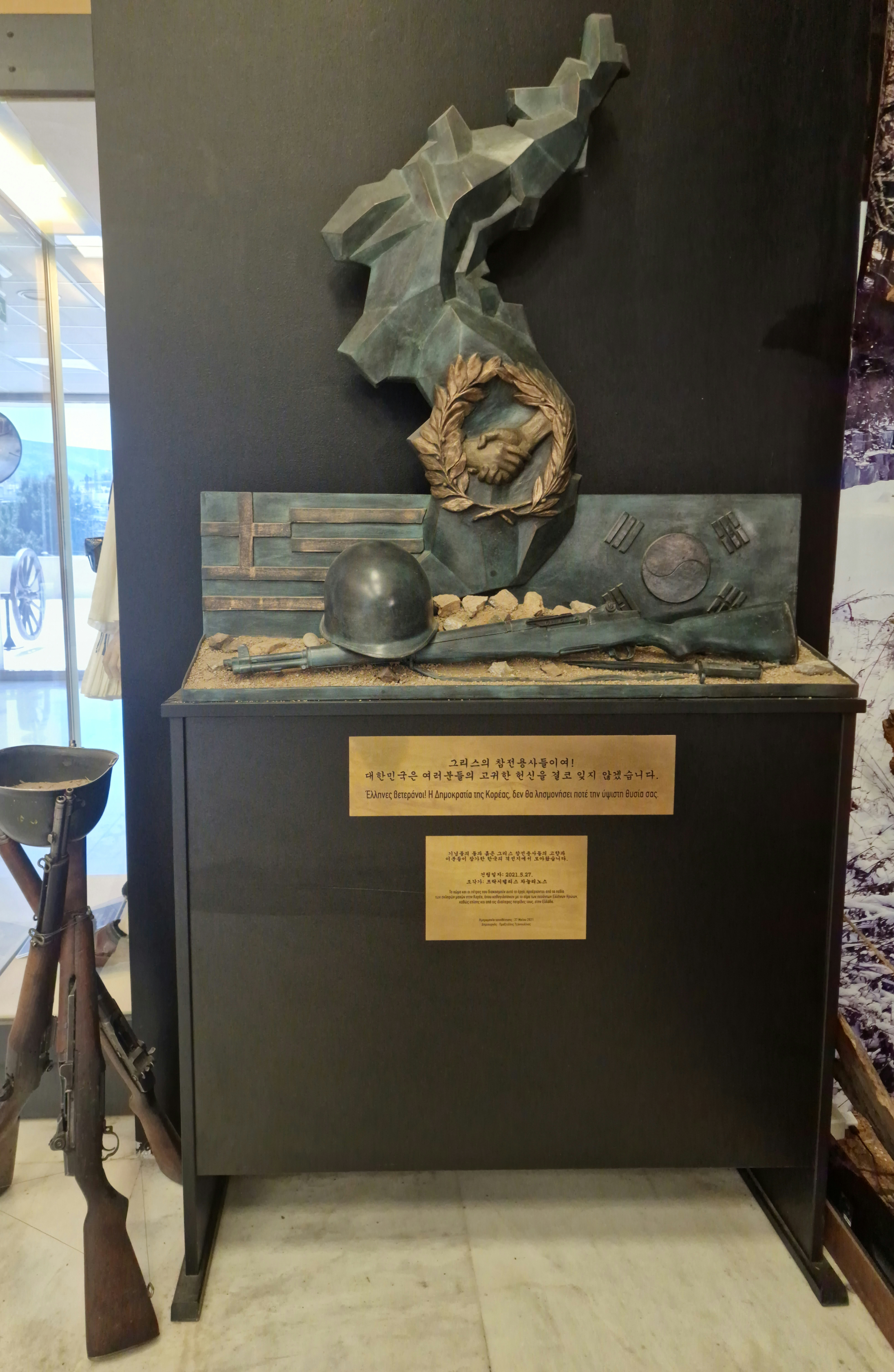
Monument dedicated to the Greek Force in the Athens War Museum

=== In the War Memorial of Korea at Seoul ===
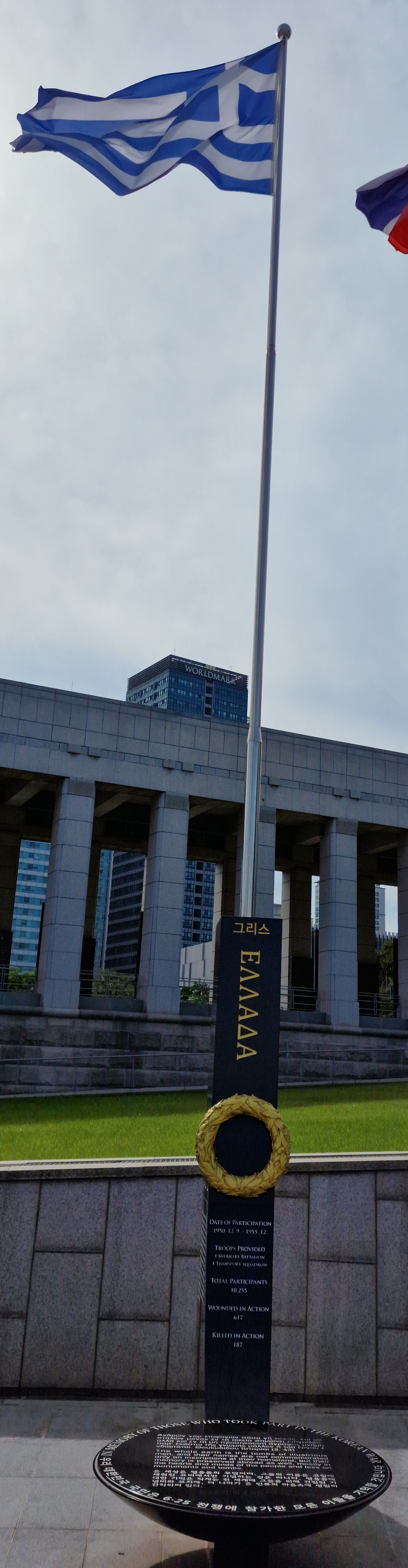
Greece monument at the War Memorial of Korea

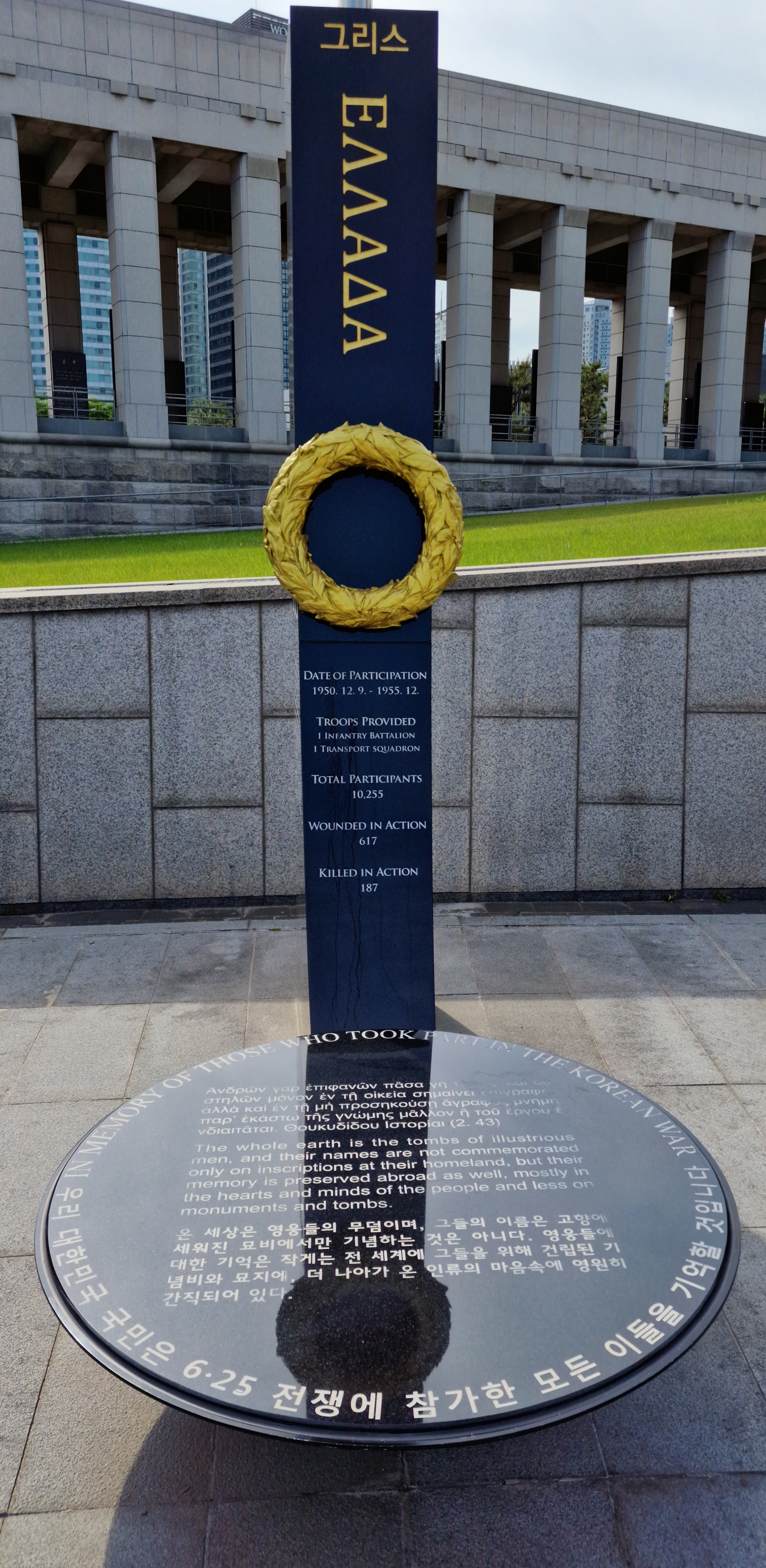
Part of Greece's monument at the War Memorial of Korea

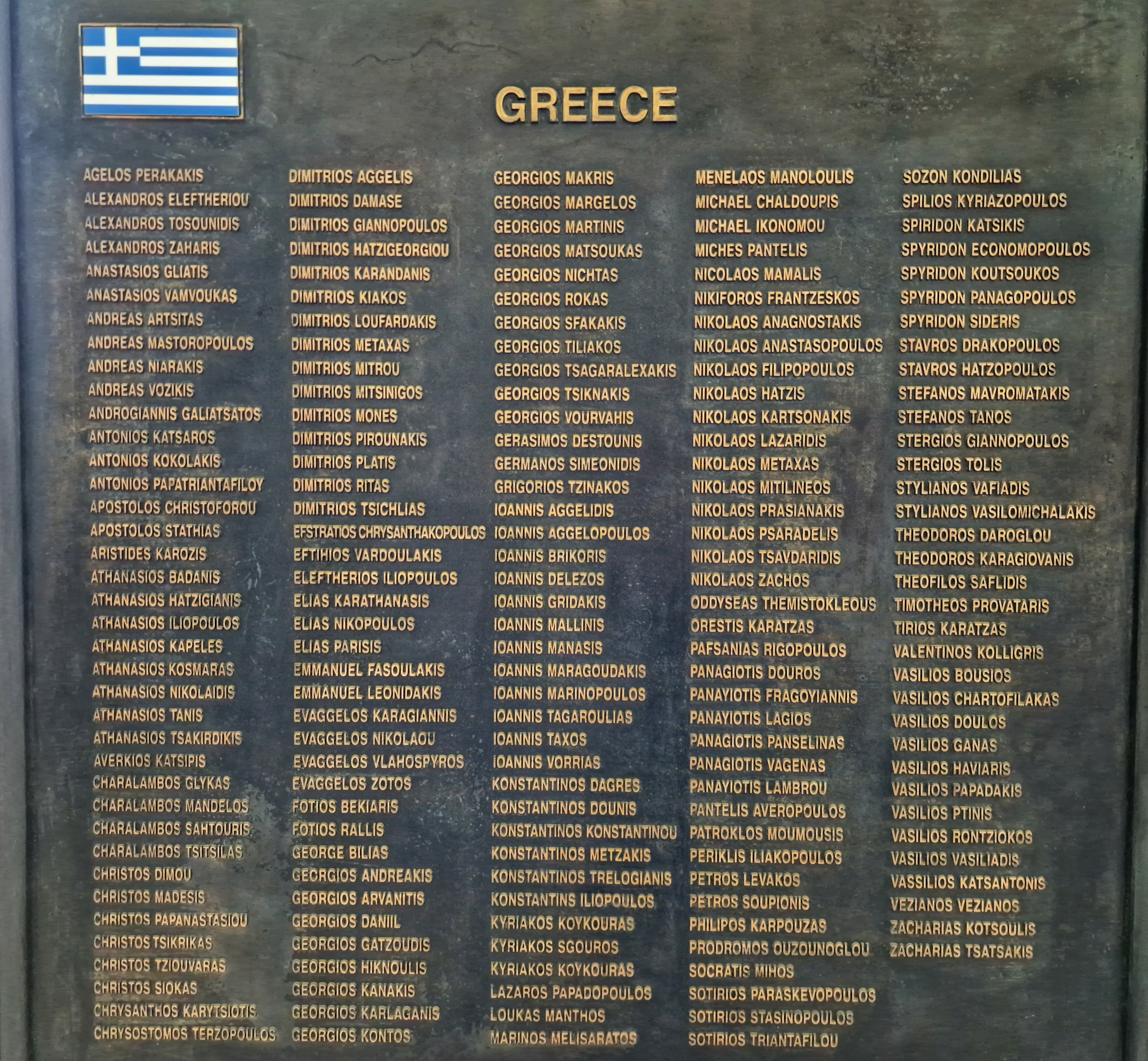
Names of the Greeks who were killed in action, at the War Memorial of Korea

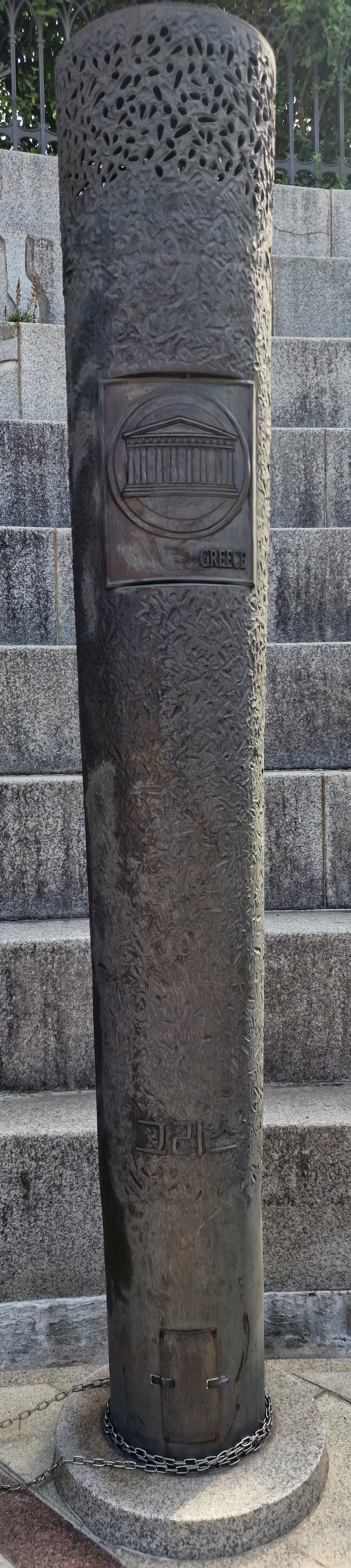
Greece stele at the War Memorial of Korea

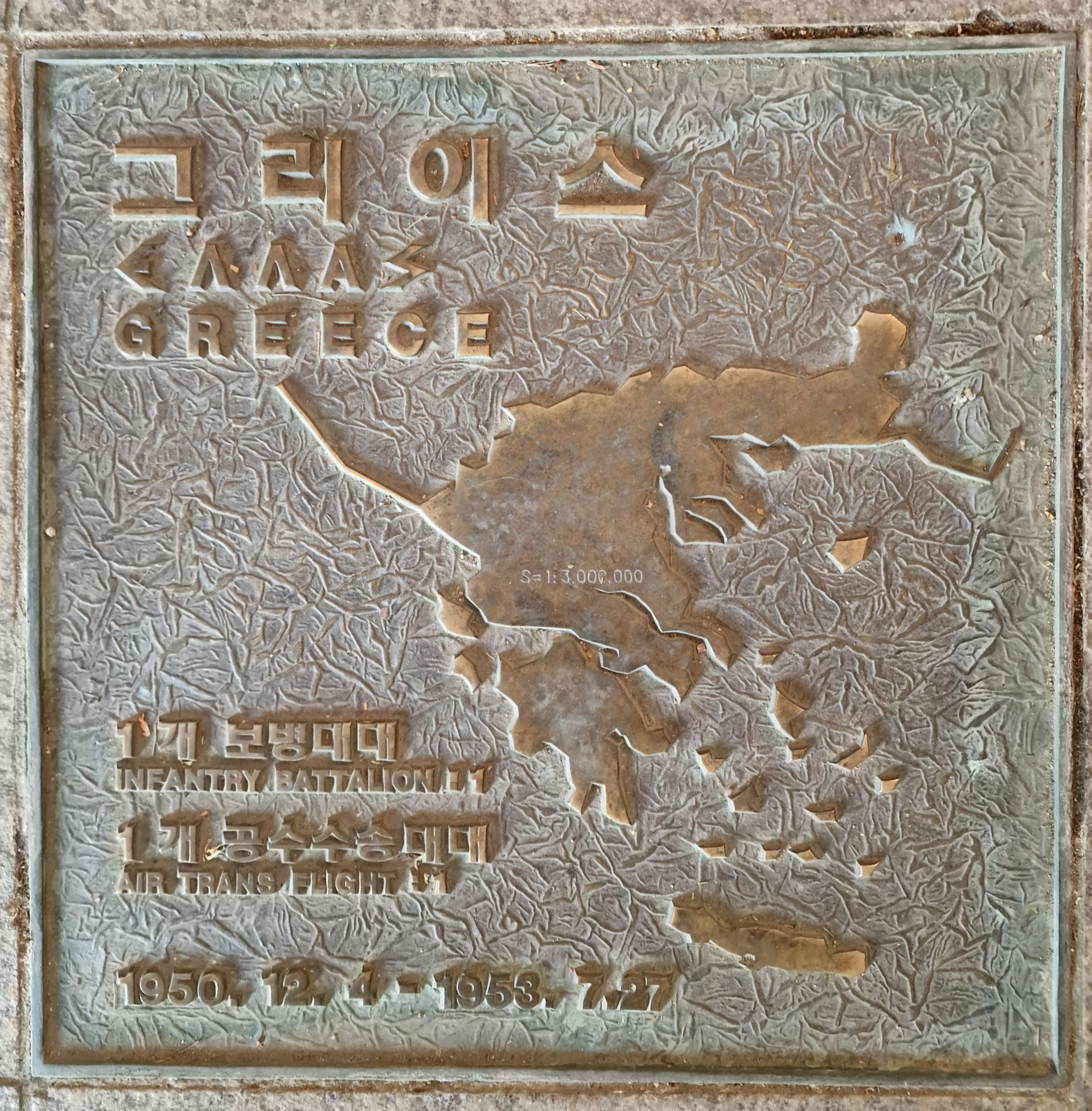
Greece plaque inside the Statue of Brothers

=== In the UN Memorial Cemetery at Busan ===
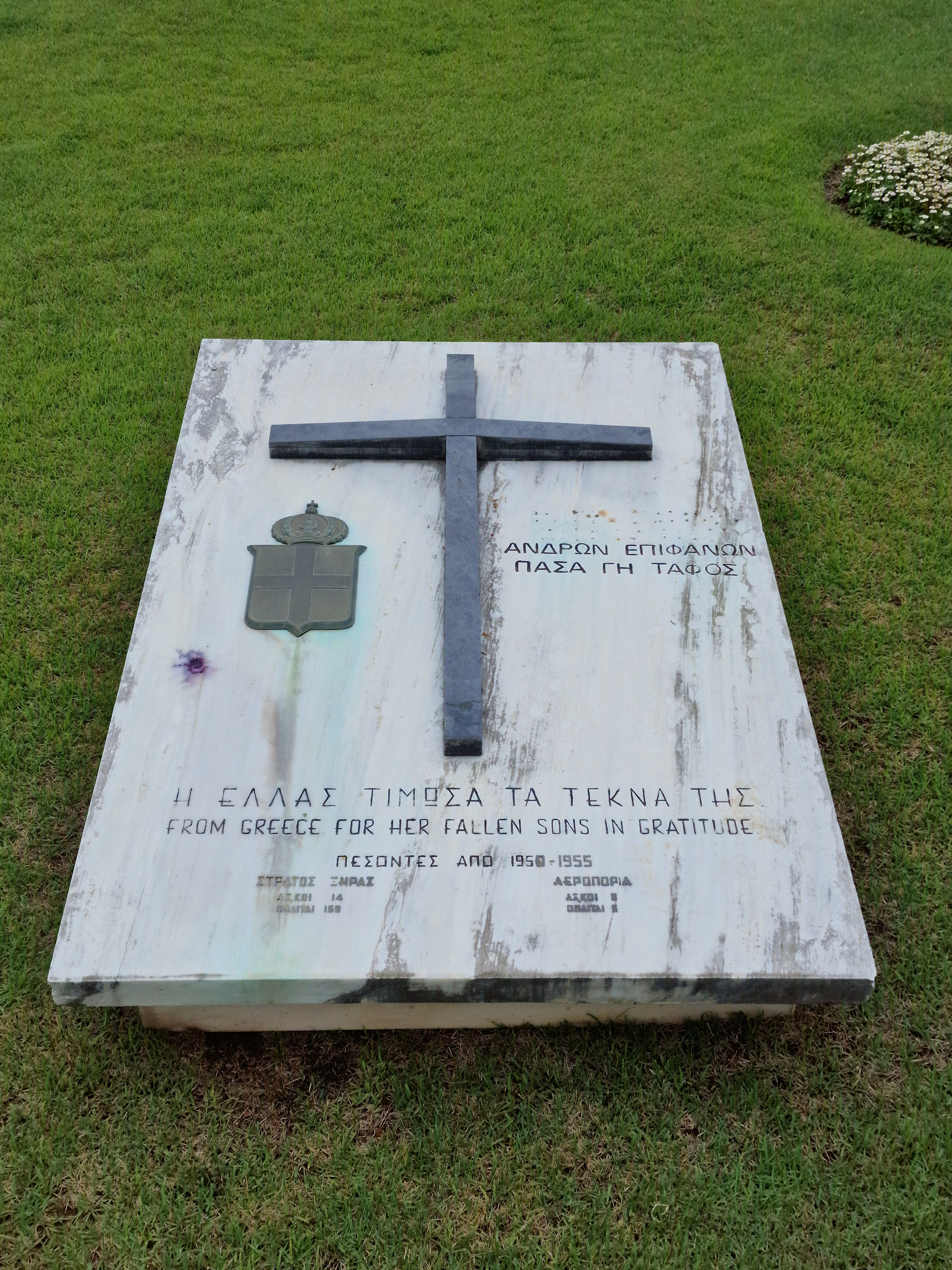
Greece memorial in the United Nations Memorial Cemetery

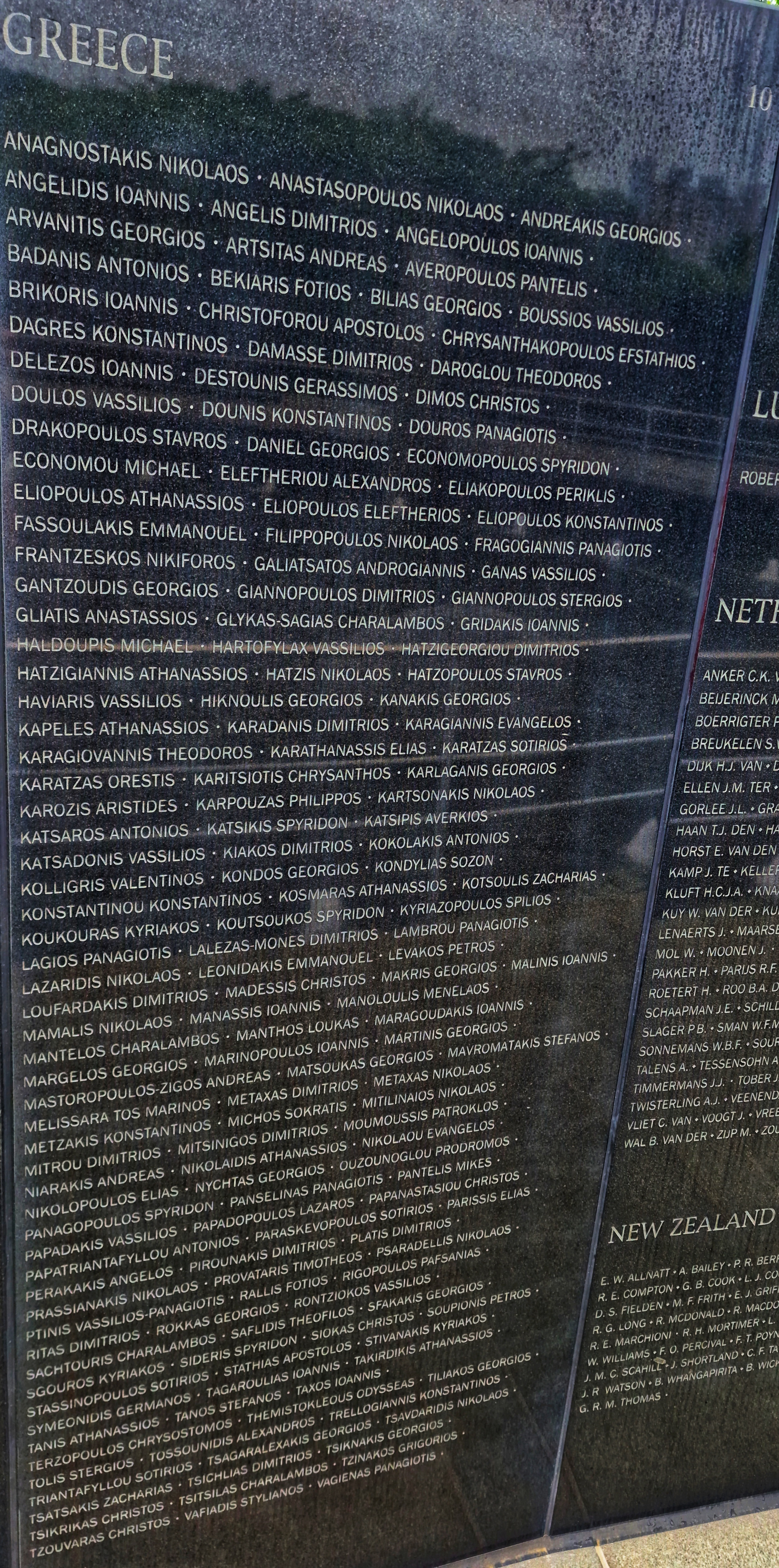
Names of the fallen Greeks on the Wall of Remembrance at the United Nations Memorial Cemetery

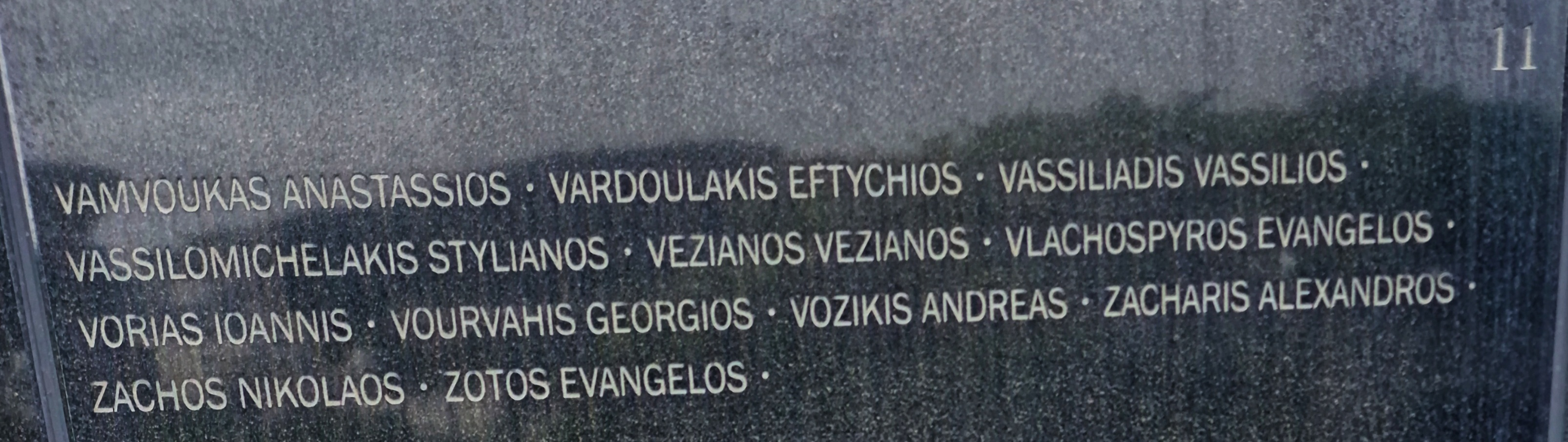
Names of the fallen Greeks on the Wall of Remembrance at the United Nations Memorial Cemetery

== In popular culture ==
The American feature film The Glory Brigade deals with the mission of the Greek military and its joint operations with U.S. forces in the Korean War. The movie was shot in Hollywood and on location in rural Missouri in late 1952, and it was released in spring 1953, shortly before the end of the war. Film star Victor Mature plays a U.S. officer of Greek descent in the movie. Alexander Scourby, an American actor of Greek heritage, plays a Greek officer.

== See also ==
- United Nations Forces in the Korean War
- Medical support in the Korean War
