= Gamaksan =

Gamaksan (Korean: 감악산; 紺岳山) is the name of several mountains in South Korea, including:

- Gamaksan (Gyeonggi) in Paju, Yangju, and Yeoncheon, Gyeonggi-do
- Gamaksan (Gangwon) in Wonju, Gangwon-do, and Jecheon, Chungcheongbuk-do
