= Outpost Harry =

Korean War outpost

- Part of the Korean War
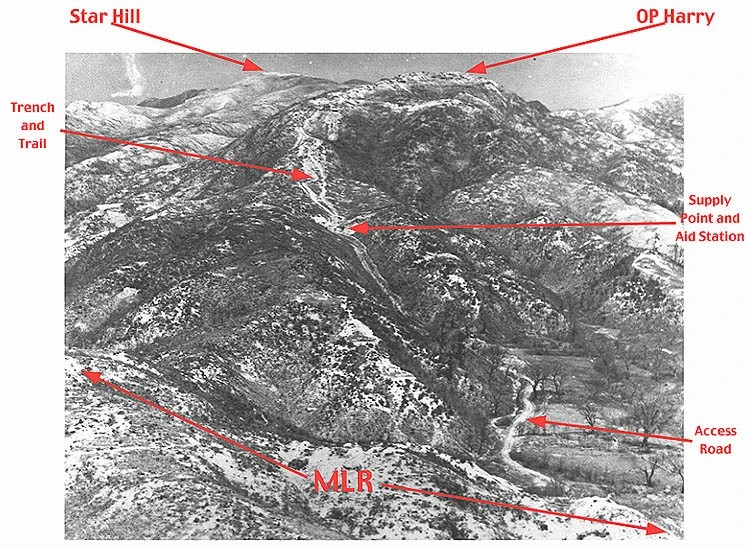
Date	10–18 June 1953
Location	38°19′6.33″N 127°17′35.08″E near the Iron Triangle
Result	United Nations victory

Belligerents
United Nations (UNC): United States; Greece	China

Commanders and leaders
(United States) Eugene W. Ridings (United States) Russell F. Akers Jr. (Kingdom of Greece) Georgios Koumanakos	(China) Xiao Xuanjin

Units involved
(United States) 3rd Infantry Division: (United States) 15th Infantry Regiment; (Kingdom of Greece) Greek "Sparta" Battalion	(China) 74th Division

Strength
5,000	13,000

Casualties and losses
102 killed 553 wounded 44 missing	1,450 killed 3,800 wounded (estimated)

Outpost Harry was a remote Korean War outpost located on a tiny hilltop in what was commonly referred to as the "Iron Triangle" on the Korean Peninsula. This was an area approximately 60 miles (100 km) northeast of Seoul and was the most direct route to the South Korean capital.

Most of the fighting occurred at night, under heavy mortar fire, while the daylight hours were usually spent by the UN forces evacuating the dead and wounded, replacing the defending company, sending up resupplies and repairing the fortified positions. The daylight hours were punctuated with artillery, mortar and sniper fire, making repairs and reinforcement a more dangerous task. During the 4 to 5 days prior to the initial attack on the outpost, PVA artillery and mortar fire increased from an average of 275 to 670 per day during daylight hours.

The soldiers of the Greek Expeditionary Force, Sparta Battalion adapted its name and called it Outpost "Haros", the modern Greek equivalent to Charon, Greek mythology's ferryman to the underworld of Hades.

== Background ==
Outpost Harry's elevation was around 1,280 feet (390 m) and positioned some 320 yards (290 m) south of a larger landmass occupied by the PVA called "Star Hill" and some 425 yards (389 m) northeast of UN positions. A service road that wound from the Main Line of Resistance (MLR) along an intermittent stream led to the rear of the outpost where a medical aid station and a supply point were located. Harry was an outpost east of the Chorwon Valley with sister outposts to the west called Tom and Dick. Outpost Dick was about 100 yards (91 m) in front of the MLR, and Tom was about 250–300 yards (230–270 m) in front and below the MLR. The latter was the floor of the valley. Harry, which was over 400 yards (370 m) from the MLR, was also higher than the MLR, making supply much more difficult. The route to the outpost was under constant PVA observation and fire, and its height made it harder to pack supplies up the hill. Unlike Tom and Dick, which could get supporting fire from the MLR, Harry got less close supporting fire from the MLR because company 60mm mortars and the heavy machine guns did not have enough range. Harry relied more on artillery and heavy mortar companies.

The outpost was a strategic position desired by the PVA. Its defense and preservation was viewed as critical because it blocked PVA observation down the Kumwha Valley and shielded that portion of the MLR from direct fire. If the UN forces lost the outpost, the US Eighth Army would have had to withdraw approximately 6 miles (10 km) to the next defensible line.

The position contained a communication trench line which ran from the supply point forward some 400 yards (370 m) to the top. At that point, the trench line joined another trench that made a complete circle around the outpost with an additional finger that ran along the east ridge about 100 yards (91 m). The trench line was deep enough to walk around the perimeter unseen by the PVA. It was fortified with reinforced fighting bunkers, a command post and a forward observation bunker. It could accommodate approximately 150 infantrymen.

During the period of 1–8 June 1953, aerial reconnaissance indicated that the PVA were building for a major offensive. The units identified were the PVA 22nd & 221st Regiments of the 74th Division.

== Battle ==
=== 10-11 June ===
Early on 10 June, K Company, 15th Infantry Regiment, commanded by Captain Martin A. Markley, had been briefed on an imminent attack, and he in turn briefed his men. Ammunition and communications were checked, as were final protective fires.

During the night of the first attack, the PVA outnumbered Harry's defenders by 30 to 1. "All total, there was a reinforced PVA regiment of approximately 3,600 enemy trying to kill us," said Markley. Despite an intense barrage of defensive firepower and the detonation of Napalm, the PVA stormed the slopes of the outpost and soon penetrated the trenches. When K Company got under cover in bunkers, UN Variable Time (VT) artillery was called in to stop the attack. The artillery rounds exploded in the air rather than on impact, and this, plus hand-to-hand combat, finally drove the PVA from Harry that night. By morning, all but a dozen Americans had been killed or severely wounded. K Company was so depleted that they were immediately reinforced by a reserve platoon and then replaced by another company of the 3rd Battalion. In addition to a composite reserve committed by the 3rd battalion commander Colonel Russell F. Akers Jr., Companies E and C 15th Infantry were committed to reinforce. One platoon of tanks from Heavy Tank Company, 15th Infantry, and one platoon of infantry were committed to the valley east of Outpost Harry as a diversionary force. This tank-infantry team proved to be of great value in channeling the enemy attack.

M/Sgt (then Sgt.) Ola L. Mize was awarded the Medal of Honor for his actions on Outpost Harry that night.

=== 11-12 June ===
B Company of the 15th and B Company of the 5th Regimental Combat Team (5th RCT) defended Harry. The PVA began with another massive artillery and mortar barrage, continuing through most of the night. PVA infantry crept in close through the artillery fire and had gained the trenches on the rear of the outpost where bitter hand-to-hand fighting ensued. Company B, 5th RCT, was used to reinforce the defenders, while the PVA attempted to reinforce the initial successful assault through the night. By daybreak, at approximately 05:45, the PVA again called off their assault and withdrew.

On 25 September 2010, PFC Charles R. Johnson was posthumously awarded the Silver Star, 57 years after his death, by Brigadier general Jeffrey Phillips, 3rd Infantry Division Rear-Detachment Commander. The 20-year-old soldier was credited with single-handedly trying to hold off PVA forces and protect nine or more wounded soldiers at Outpost Harry on 12 June 1953.

=== 12-13 June ===
A Company of the 5th RCT and L Company of the 15th Infantry Regiment defended Harry. They were supported by a detachment from the 10th Combat Engineer Battalion that got trapped on the outpost while on a mine laying detail. At 22:00 on 12 June 12, PVA artillery and mortar fire preceded an attack on the outpost which was broken up by UN defensive fires. The PVA were in the trench for a short time but were forced to withdraw. Fighting ceased at 22:47. However at 02:08 the PVA attacked from the north, northeast, and northwest of the outpost. Bitter hand-to-hand fighting ensued as the PVA gained the trench on the northern slope of the outpost. Company L, 15th Infantry, reinforced, and by 04:50 the PVA were driven from the trenches and forced to withdraw. A platoon of tanks from the 64th Tank Battalion plus one platoon of infantry were dispatched to the valley east of Outpost Harry and operated successfully as a diversionary force. All action ceased with the exception of UN counter-battery and counter-mortar fire.

=== 13-14 June ===
C Company, 5th RCT took responsibility for Harry on 13 June. That night at approximately 02:55, PVA artillery and mortar fire preceded a screening action against the outpost from the east and west for the purpose of protecting recovery of their dead. This screening force was broken up by UN defensive fires. Action became sporadic, with light PVA artillery and mortar fire falling on the outpost and MLR. By 04:40 the PVA withdrew and all action ceased.

=== 14-15 June ===
G Company, 15th infantry had their turn at defending Outpost Harry. At about 01:25 the PVA assaulting through PVA and UN artillery and defensive fires gained the trenches on the rear of the outpost, and intense hand-to-hand fighting followed. At 02:22, UN forces held the outpost with the PVA reinforcing in the bitter hand to hand action. Company E, 15th Infantry was committed to reinforce. One platoon from Heavy Tank Company and one platoon of Infantry were again dispatched as diversionary force. At 03:45 the PVA withdrew and action ceased.

=== 15-16 June ===
A Company, 15th Infantry was committed to the defense of the outpost, and it turned out to be a quiet night on the outpost. The following morning the regimental commander placed the Greek Expeditionary Forces "Spartan" Battalion in the area of the outpost Harry sector in order that his US battalions, all of which had suffered heavy casualties, could refit and reorganize.

=== 16-18 June ===
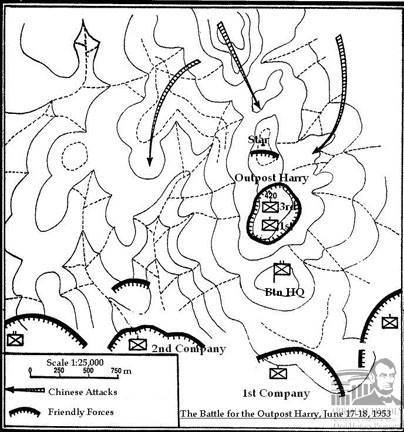
Map of Outpost Harry, June 17-18, 1953. It clearly shows its distance from friendly lines, and its vulnerability to enemy attack.

During the night of June 16 there was no significant action, permitting much-needed engineer work on the outpost to be accomplished by Company P, Sparta Battalion, during the day with assistance from Company B, 10th Combat Engineer Battalion. The engineers did not remain on the outpost overnight.

On the morning of 18 June, the PVA returned at around midnight, moving through their own and UN artillery and mortar fire to attack Outpost Harry from the northeast and northwest. The PVA were repelled and forced to withdraw, but they stayed in the area. At 02:40 the PVA attacked from the north under intense artillery and mortar fire. The PVA got in to the trenches of the outpost on the northern slope at 03:13. Bitter hand-to-hand fighting ensued with the PVA making numerous attempts to reinforce through the protective artillery ring. Company N, Sparta Battalion was committed to reinforce. One platoon of tanks from Heavy Tank Company, 15th Infantry Regiment, and one platoon of Spartan Infantry were dispatched to the valley east of Outpost Harry as a diversionary force. By 04:02 the PVA were forced out of the trenches on the outpost, and all action ceased with the PVA withdrawing, having fired 22,000 rounds in support of this attack.

== Aftermath ==
The PVA forces employed against Outpost Harry were tabulated by U.S. Intelligence Sections:

10-11 June: one reinforced regiment (approximately 3,600 troops)

11-12 June: one regiment (approximately 2,850 troops)

12-13 June: one reinforced regiment

13-14 June: an estimated 100 troops

14-15 June: an estimated 120 troops

17-18 June: one reorganized and reinforced regiment (approximately 3,000 troops)

During this period the entire PVA 74th Division was utilized against this position and at the end of the engagement was considered combat ineffective. Rounds fired in support of their attack amounted to 88,810 rounds over 81mm in size: UN mortar and artillery units in conjunction with friendly tank fires expended 368,185 rounds over 81mm in size.

Casualty figures were

15th Infantry Regiment - 68 killed, 343 wounded, 35 missing; KATUSA - 8 killed, 51 wounded, 7 missing;

Greek Expeditionary Force, Sparta Battalion - 15 killed, 36 wounded, 1 missing.

Attached and supporting units 5th RCT - 13 killed, 67 wounded, 1 missing;

10th Engineer Battalion - 5 killed, 23 wounded;

39th FA - 5 killed, 13 wounded.

According to Chinese sources, the 74th Division and other two divisions of 24 Corps suffered total 2038 casualties from May 27 to June 23.

=== Distinguished Unit Citations ===
For the first time in the annals of U.S. military history, five rifle companies together, four American and one Greek, would receive the prestigious Distinguished Unit Citation (now called the Presidential Unit Citation (PUC)) for the outstanding performance of their shared mission.

- Company K, 15th Infantry Regiment, 3rd Infantry Division (Third Award)
- Company F, 65th Infantry Regiment, 3rd Infantry Division
- Company B, 15th Infantry Regiment, 3rd Infantry Division
- Company A, 15th Infantry Regiment, 5th Regimental Combat Team and attached units
- Company P, Greek Expeditionary Forces, Sparta Battalion (Second Award)
