= Ola L. Mize =

United States Army officer (1931–2014)

Ola Lee Mize
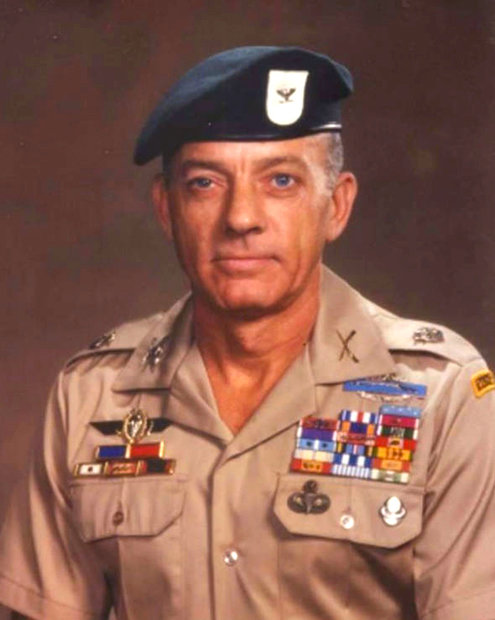
- Born: August 28, 1931; Albertville, Alabama, U.S.
- Died: March 12, 2014 (aged 82); Gadsden, Alabama, U.S.
- Burial place: Crestwood Memorial Cemetery, East Gadsden, Alabama
- Military career
- Allegiance: United States
- Branch: United States Army
- Service years: 1950–1981
- Rank: Colonel
- Units: 15th Infantry Regiment, 3rd Infantry Division
- Conflicts: Korean War: Attack on Outpost Harry; Vietnam War
- Awards: Medal of Honor; Silver Star; Legion of Merit (2); Bronze Star Medal (5); Purple Heart

Ola Lee Mize (August 28, 1931 – March 12, 2014) was a United States Army officer and a recipient of the Medal of Honor for his actions in the Korean War.

== Early life ==
Mize was born in Albertville, Alabama, the son of a sharecropper. He left school after 9th grade to help support his family. After several years of working for low pay, he attempted to enlist in the army, but was rejected for being too light, at 120 pounds (54 kg). He tried repeatedly to enlist and was eventually accepted, joining the United States Army in 1950 from Gadsden, Alabama.

== Military career ==
Assigned to the 82nd Airborne Division, Mize planned to finish his term of service and return to school. When the Korean War began, he changed his plans and reenlisted in hopes of seeing combat. He volunteered for a front-line unit and ended up as a sergeant in Company K of the 15th Infantry Regiment, 3rd Infantry Division. On June 10, 1953, his unit was manning Outpost Harry near Surang-ni, Korea, when the post came under heavy enemy attack. Mize organized defensive positions, rescued wounded soldiers, and engaged the enemy until reinforcements arrived about noon the next day. He was subsequently promoted to master sergeant and, on September 24, 1954, awarded the Medal of Honor for his actions at Outpost Harry. Major General Charles D. W. Canham, commander of the 3rd Infantry Division, presided over a pass in review by the 15th Infantry in Mize's honor prior to Mize being returned to the United States where he was presented with the medal by President Eisenhower in Denver, Colorado.

Mize later joined the Special Forces, where he gained a commission and served three tours of duty in the Vietnam War. In 1965, he was assigned to the Special Forces Training Group, where he was the Advanced Training Committee chief for SCUBA, HALO, and the SKY HOOK schools. Mize is credited for being the officer responsible for starting the present day Combat Divers Qualification Course in Key West, Florida. From 1966 to 1967, he was again assigned to Vietnam with the 5th Special Forces Group where he was an Operational A, B, and C Detachment Commander and once more in 1969, where he was assigned to the 5th Special Forces Group as the Commander of the 3rd Mobile Strike Force Command (Cambodian Troops). During his tour while commander of B-36 3rd Mobile Strike Force, he was awarded the Silver Star in 1969.

Mize retired from the army in 1981 as a colonel.

== Later life ==
Mize died of cancer on March 12, 2014, at Gadsden, Alabama, aged 82.

== Medal of Honor citation ==
Rank and organization: Master Sergeant (then Sgt.), U.S. Army, Company K, 15th Infantry Regiment, 3d Infantry Division.

Place and date: Near Surang-ni, Korea, 10 to 11 June 1953.

Entered service at: Gadsden, Ala. Born: 28 August 1931, Marshall County, Ala.

G.O. No.: 70, 24 September 1954.

Citation:

M/Sgt. Mize, a member of Company K, distinguished himself by conspicuous gallantry and outstanding courage above and beyond the call of duty in action against the enemy. Company K was committed to the defense of "Outpost Harry", a strategically valuable position, when the enemy launched a heavy attack. Learning that a comrade on a friendly listening post had been wounded he moved through the intense barrage, accompanied by a medical aid man, and rescued the wounded soldier. On returning to the main position he established an effective defense system and inflicted heavy casualties against attacks from determined enemy assault forces which had penetrated into trenches within the outpost area. During his fearless actions he was blown down by artillery and grenade blasts 3 times but each time he dauntlessly returned to his position, tenaciously fighting and successfully repelling hostile attacks. When enemy onslaughts ceased he took his few men and moved from bunker to bunker, firing through apertures and throwing grenades at the foe, neutralizing their positions. When an enemy soldier stepped out behind a comrade, prepared to fire, M/Sgt. Mize killed him, saving the life of his fellow soldier. After rejoining the platoon, moving from man to man, distributing ammunition, and shouting words of encouragement he observed a friendly machine gun position overrun. He immediately fought his way to the position, killing 10 of the enemy and dispersing the remainder. Fighting back to the command post, and finding several friendly wounded there, he took a position to protect them. Later, securing a radio, he directed friendly artillery fire upon the attacking enemy's routes of approach. At dawn he helped regroup for a counterattack which successfully drove the enemy from the outpost. M/Sgt. Mize's valorous conduct and unflinching courage reflect lasting glory upon himself and uphold the noble traditions of the military service.

== Awards and Decorations ==

Badge	Combat Infantryman Badge with star denoting 2nd award		
1st row	Medal of Honor	Silver Star	Legion of Merit with 1 Oak leaf cluster
2nd row	Bronze Star Medal with "V" Device and 4 Oak leaf clusters	Purple Heart	Air Medal with Award numeral 4
3rd row	Army Commendation Medal with 1 Oak leaf cluster	Army Good Conduct Medal with 2 Good Conduct Loops	National Defense Service Medal with 1 Oak leaf cluster
4th row	Korean Service Medal with 2 Campaign stars	Armed Forces Expeditionary Medal	National Defense Service Medal with 1 Oak leaf cluster
5th row	Korean Service Medal with 5 Campaign stars	Armed Forces Expeditionary Medal	Vietnam Service Medal with 5 Campaign stars
6th row	Armed Forces Reserve Medal	Republic of Vietnam Gallantry Cross with Palm	Republic of Vietnam Gallantry Cross with Silver Star
7th row	United Nations Service Medal Korea	Vietnam Campaign Medal	Korean War Service Medal Retroactively Awarded, 2003
Badge	Master Parachutist Badge		Diver Badge
Tab	Special Forces Tab		Ranger Tab
Unit Awards	Presidential Unit Citation		Meritorious Unit Commendation
Unit Awards	Korean Presidential Unit Citation	RVN Gallantry Cross Unit Citation with Palm	RVN Civil Actions Unit Citation 1st class

Patches

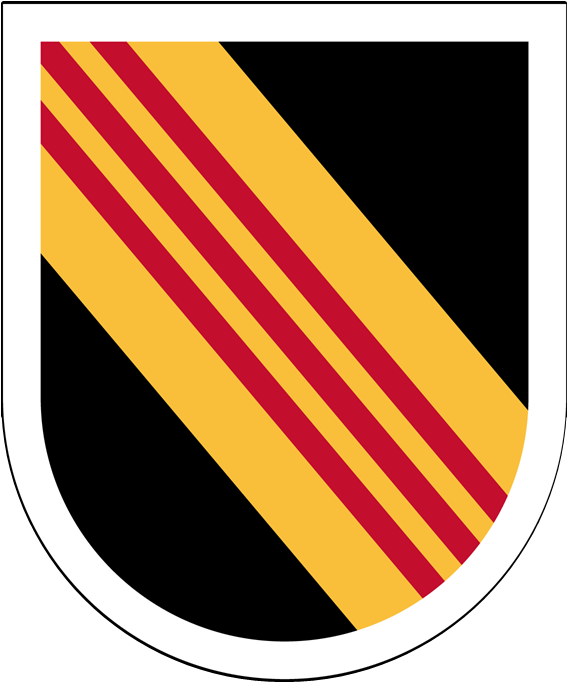

3rd Infantry Division Patch	7th Special Forces Flash	5th Special Forces Flash

Foreign Awards

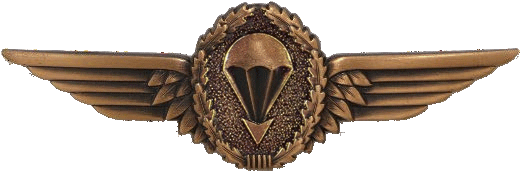

Parachutist Badge

West Germany

RVN Psychological Warfare Medal

== Legacy ==
A section of Steel Station Road in Gadsden, Alabama, is named Col. Ola Lee Mize Medal of Honor Highway in his honor.

On May 14, 2015, the Special Forces Underwater Operations School in Key West, Florida, celebrated its 50th anniversary by naming its headquarters building in his honor.

== See also ==
- List of Korean War Medal of Honor recipients
