= Charles R. Johnson (soldier) =

Medal of Honor recipient (1932–1953)

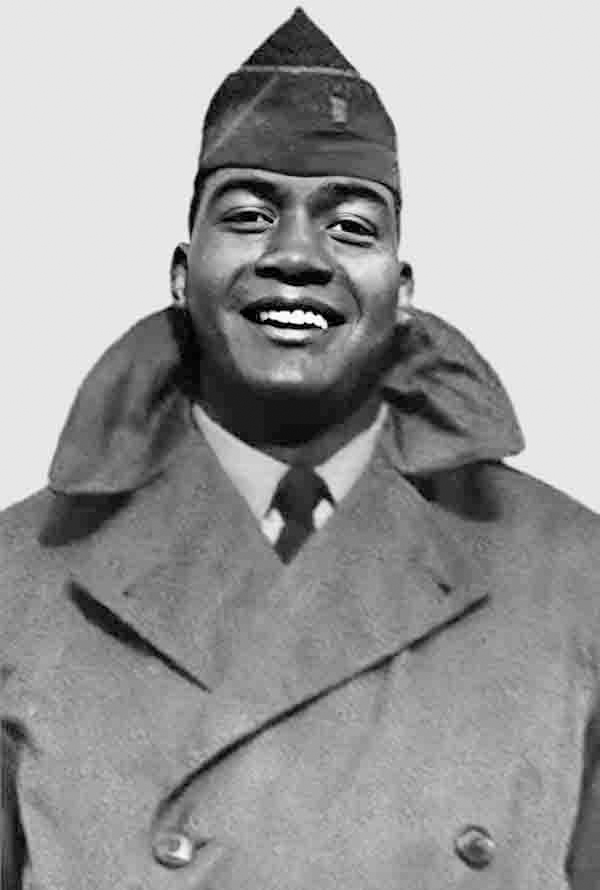
- Johnson in c. 1952
- Born: 11 August 1932; Sharon, Connecticut, U.S.
- Died: 12 June 1953 (aged 20); Outpost Harry, Iron Triangle, Korea
- Burial place: Arlington National Cemetery
- Military career
- Allegiance: United States
- Branch: United States Army
- Service years: 1952–1953
- Rank: Private first class
- Units: Company B, 15th Infantry Regiment
- Conflicts: Korean War: Battle of Outpost Harry †
- Awards: Medal of Honor; Purple Heart

Charles R. Johnson (11 August 1932 – 12 June 1953) was a United States Army soldier who was posthumously awarded the Medal of Honor on 3 January 2025 for his actions during the Battle of Outpost Harry in the Korean War.

== Early life ==
Charles R. Johnson was born on 11 August 1932, in Millbrook, New York, to Robert and Pearl Johnson. He was the third of six children, and his family called him “Buddy.” He was a very talented athlete and musician who lettered in football, baseball and basketball, played the trumpet and sang in the choir.

Johnson attended Millbrook High School for three years, and transferred to Arlington High School in Poughkeepsie, New York, for his senior year, where he was elected class vice president and served as co-captain of the basketball team. He was also selected by his schoolmates to receive the Babe Ruth Award for good sportsmanship and fair play. He attended Howard University for one semester in the fall of 1951 and played for their football team.

== Military career ==
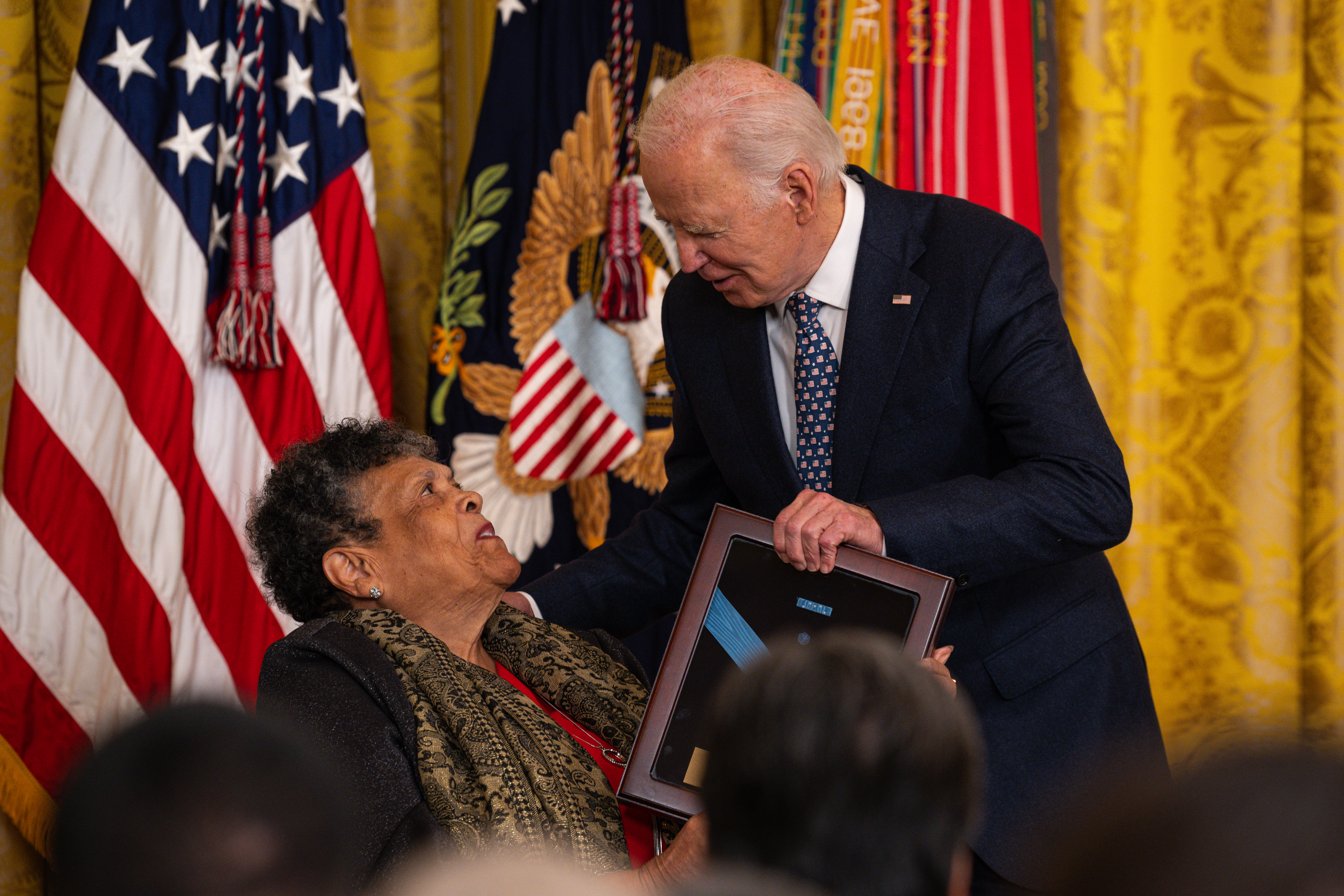
President Joe Biden presents the Medal of Honor to Johnson's sister, Juanita P. Mendez

In 1952 Johnson was drafted into the United States Army and deployed to South Korea, serving as a Browning automatic rifleman in Company B, 15th Infantry Regiment, 3rd Infantry Division.

On the night of 11 June 1953, his unit was defending Outpost Harry when it was attacked by an estimated 3,000 People's Volunteer Army (PVA) soldiers. After recognizing their situation as untenable, and with disregard for his personal safety, he placed himself between the enemy and his injured comrades, and told them he would hold off the PVA as best as he could. His efforts saved the lives of as many as 10 soldiers.

Johnson was posthumously awarded the Silver Star in 2010 for his actions at Outpost Harry. His Silver Star was upgraded to the Medal of Honor on 3 January 2025.

== Medal of Honor citation ==
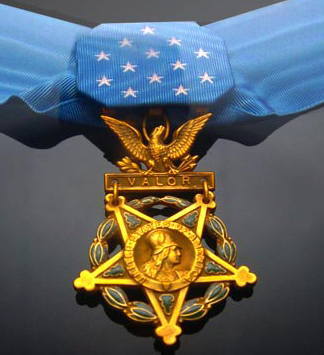

The President of the United States of America, authorized by Act of Congress March 3rd, 1863, has awarded in the name of Congress the Medal of Honor to

Pfc. Charles R. Johnson distinguished himself by conspicuous gallantry and intrepidity beyond the call of duty while defending Outpost Harry against overwhelming odds, and making the ultimate sacrifice to save the lives of his comrades in the Republic of Korea, June 11–12, 1953.

Johnson was serving as a Browning automatic rifleman with Company B, 15th Infantry Regiment, 3rd Infantry Division, when Chinese forces attacked his unit during a massive nighttime assault. During the ensuing battle, overwhelming numbers of Chinese troops assaulted the trenches and bunkers defended by Johnson and his squad.

Johnson, wounded from a direct artillery hit on his bunker and subsequently from a hand grenade, administered first aid to those more seriously injured. Understanding the seriousness of the situation and being under direct fire from the enemy, Johnson dragged a wounded Soldier to a secure bunker, stopping intermittently to aid injured Soldiers and kill several enemy troops in hand-to-hand combat.

Departing the safety of the second bunker, he conducted a search for weapons and ammunition, then returned to rearm the others. After recognizing their situation as untenable, and with disregard for his personal safety, he exited the bunker, placing himself between the enemy and his injured comrades, and told them he would hold off the enemy forces as best as he could.

His brave and selfless efforts saved the lives of as many as 10 Soldiers. Johnson's extraordinary actions in close combat with the enemy, his unyielding courage and bravery, and his profound concern for his fellow Soldiers are in keeping with the highest traditions of military service and reflect great credit upon himself, his unit and the United States Army.

== Awards and Decorations ==

Badge	Combat Infantryman Badge		
1st row	Medal of Honor Upgraded from Silver Star in 2025		
2nd row	Purple Heart	Army Good Conduct Medal	National Defense Service Medal
3rd row	Korean Service Medal with 1 Campaign star	United Nations Service Medal Korea	Korean War Service Medal Retroactively Awarded, 2003
Unit awards	Presidential Unit Citation		Korean Presidential Unit Citation

== Additional Honors ==
In 2014 the Johnson Fitness Center at Fort Stewart, Georgia — an 80,000 foot facility that features an indoor swimming pool, running track, climbing wall and cardio rooms was named after him under the 3rd Infantry Division.

At Arlington High School, there is a Charlie Johnson Hall, which features a bronze statue of Johnson pulling his classmate Don Dingee to safety during the battle at Outpost Harry, and a Wall of Remembrance that lists the names and stories of Arlington alumni who were killed in action while serving in the armed forces.

Johnson's friends and classmates, along with students, staff and administrators from the Arlington School District, established the Charlie Johnson Legacy Project, which helps teach lessons inspired by Johnson, including loyalty, brotherhood, selflessness, courage, compassion, responsibility, patriotism and integrity. Each year the project awards scholarships to male and female students who reflect the most Charlie Johnson-like qualities.

== See also ==
- List of Korean War Medal of Honor recipients
