= Georgios Pleionis =

Greek military personnel (1920–2021)

Georgios Pleionis (Greek: Γεώργιος Πλειώνης, 17 March 1920 – 19 April 2021) was a Hellenic Air Force officer who fought in World War II, the Greek Civil War and the Korean War.

== Life ==
Georgios Pleionis was born in Kymi on the island of Euboea in 1920. He entered the Hellenic Air Force Academy in 1939, after being rejected the previous year due to low body weight.

Upon the outbreak of the Greco-Italian War the school was moved from Tatoi to Argos, where Pleionis and other officer cadets completed their basic flight training. On 3 April 1941, shortly before the German invasion of Greece, he was part of a group of officers sent to RAF Habbaniya base in Iraq to train on the Hawker Hurricane aircraft. Following the turmoils of the Anglo-Iraqi War, the Greek officers were moved to Southern Rhodesia for about three months, where they completed their training with Harvard aircraft. After a stay in Gaza, where the Greek officers fleeing from occupied Greece were being gathered, on 4 October 1942 Pleionis joined the Hurricane-equipped and Greek-crewed No. 335 Hellenic Royal Air-force Squadron under RAF command in North Africa. He participated in the operations over the Western Desert as well as convoy escort missions in the Mediterranean, and air operations in Italy and the Dalmatian coast. He returned to liberated Greece on 14 November 1944, and continued flying missions against the German garrisons left behind in Crete and other Aegean islands.

On 12 February 1943 he parachuted out of his burning Hurricane, while he was 20 miles north of the N.African coast, falling into the stormy Mediterranean, without being able to use the lifeboat. He was eventually rescued by a British warship that was escorting a convoy to Alexandria. On 30 June 1944 he was forced to abandon his Spitfire with his parachute during a convoy escort mission 40 miles north of the African coast in the Mediterranean due to engine failure. He was rescued by an amphibious aircraft. During various other missions his plane was hit by anti-aircraft fire (in the Dalmatian coast and in Milos) but managed to return to base.

Pleionis then flew missions during the Greek Civil War of 1946–1949 against the Communist "Democratic Army of Greece", and from 15 October 1951 to 30 August 1952, with the rank of Flight Commander, he led the 13th Transport Flight as part of the Greek expeditionary force in the Korean War.

During his career, Pleionis flew in total 383 combat missions, and received numerous Greek and foreign decorations, including the Cross of Valour.

Pleionis refused to cooperate with the Greek junta installed in April 1967, and was retired from service on 12 May 1967 with the rank of brigadier. Following the fall of the junta in 1974, he was retroactively promoted to the rank of air marshal.

Pleionis was the initiator and founder of the first aviation veterans association, created in 1984. On October 23, 2017, he was honoured by the Deputy Minister of Defence of the Hellenic Republic and on November 7, 2019 by the Minister of Defence together with the few remaining WWII air-force veterans

He died on 19 April 2021 at the age of 101, as the last World War II-era pilot of 335 Squadron.
