= Georgios Koumanakos =

Greek general and peace activist (1913 – 2003)

- Γεώργιος Κουμανάκος
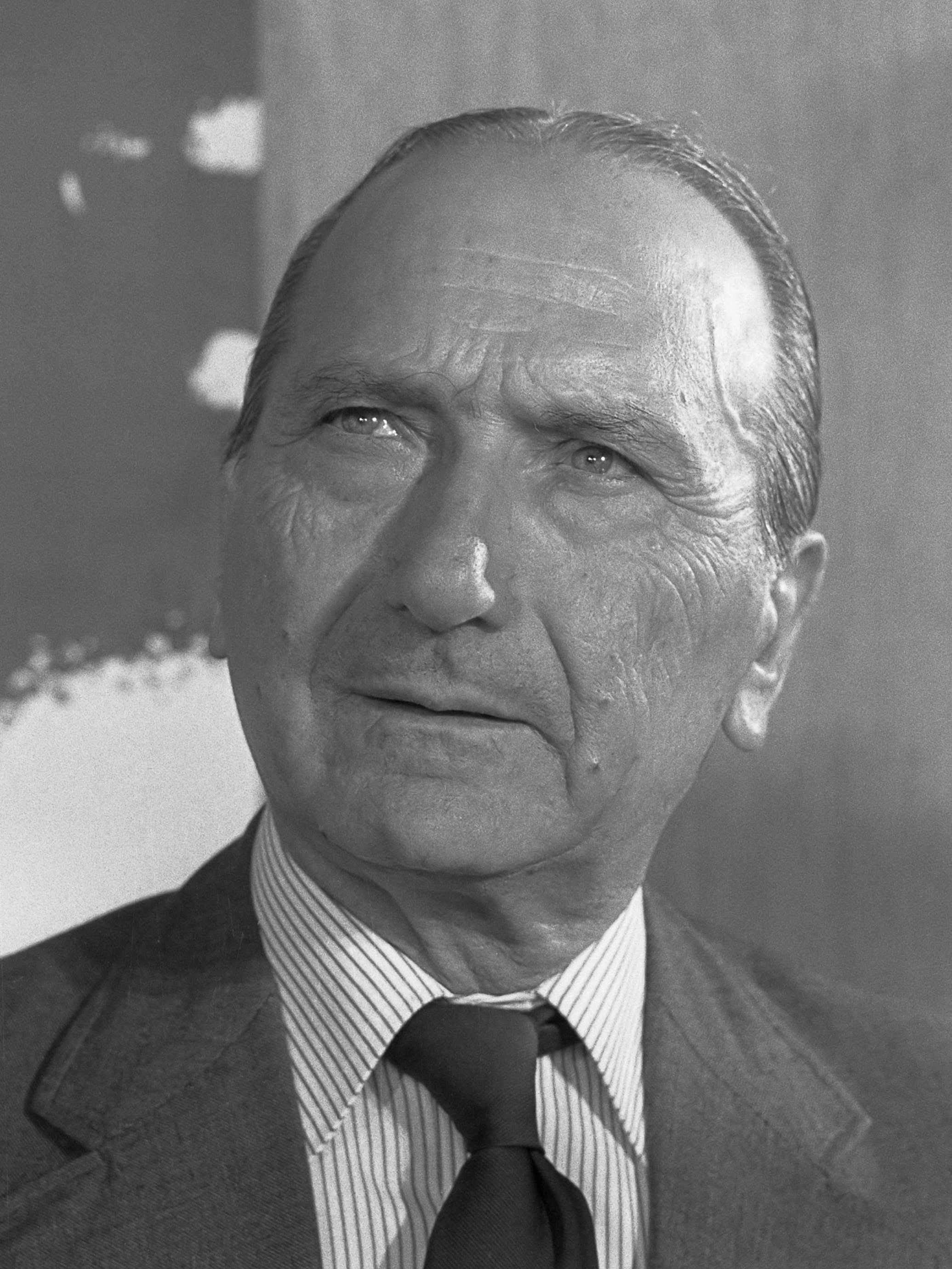
- Koumanakos c. 1981
- Born: c. 1913; Gytheio, Mani, Kingdom of Greece
- Died: c. 2003
- Military career
- Allegiance: Kingdom of Greece
- Branch: Hellenic Army
- Rank: Lieutenant General
- Commands: Greek Expeditionary Force in Korea
- Conflicts: World War II: Greco-Italian War; Battle of Greece; Greek Civil War; Korean War
- Other work: peace activist Chairman of Hellenic Telecommunications Organization; Chairman of PYRKAL weapons industry member of World Peace Council

Georgios Koumanakos (Greek: Γεώργιος Κουμανάκος, 1913 – 2003) was a Greek Army officer and peace activist.

Born in Gytheio, Mani in 1913, he fought in World War II, in the Greek Civil War against the Communists and commanded the Greek Expeditionary Force in Korea with distinction. By 1967, he had reached the rank of Lieutenant General. As an opponent of the Greek military junta of 1967-1974, he was retired from the army and sent for three years into internal exile by the military regime. Koumanakos later stated he had been approached to join the 1967 coup by an official from the US embassy, but had refused to become involved.

In 1971 he returned to Athens from exile and was admitted to the state hospital there for treatment of a hearing problem and rheumatism.

After the junta's fall in 1974, he became chairman of the state-run Hellenic Telecommunications Organization and PYRKAL weapons industry.

In the 1980s, he was a well-known activist for nuclear disarmament and the withdrawal of US bases from Greece; along with 7 other high-ranking generals from NATO countries (including Marshal Francisco da Costa Gomes and Brigadier Michael Harbottle) he co-signed the Generals for Peace and Disarmament initiative in 1981, and became a member of the Soviet-sponsored World Peace Council. Until 1983 he was vice president of the Greek Committee for International Détente and Peace and became leader of the Movement for National Independence, World Peace and Disarmament which advocated for the removal of American military bases from Greece.
