= Statue of Brothers =

War memorial in Seoul, South Korea

Coordinates: 37.535093°N 126.976157°E

The Statue of Brothers (Korean: 형제의 상; RR: Hyeongje-ui sang) is a symbol of the Korean War at the War Memorial of Korea in Seoul. Its English text reads as follows :

"The Statue of Brothers is an 18 meter wide and 11-meter high symbol of the Korean War. This statue depicts the real-life story of two brothers who fought in the Korean war on opposite sides but were accidentally reunited on the battlefield, symbolizing the Koreans' wish for national Peace, reconciliation, and reunification. It consists of the upper part, lower part and inner part. The upper part of the statue depicts a scene where a family's older brother, an ROK officer, and his younger brother, a North Korean soldier, meet in a battlefield and express reconciliation, love, and forgiveness. The lower tomb-shaped dome was built with pieces of granite collected from nationwide locations symbolizing the sacrifices made by our patriots. The crack in the dome stands for the division of Korea and the hope for reunification. Objects inside the dome include a mosaic wall painting that expresses the spirit of the Korean people to overcome the national tragedy and a map plate of the 16 UN Allied Nations that dispatched troops to the war. The links of iron chain on the ceiling signify the unbreakable bonds of a unified Korea."

The statue is located in the south-west corner of the exterior exhibit area.
