= Gamaksan (Gangwon) =

Mountain in South Korea

Highest point
- Elevation: 886 m (2,907 ft)

Geography
- Location: South Korea

Korean name
- Hangul: 감악산
- Hanja: 紺岳山
- RR: Gamaksan
- MR: Kamaksan

Gamaksan (Korean: 감악산) is a South Korean mountain that extends across Wonju, Gangwon Province, and Jecheon, North Chungcheong Province. It has an elevation of 886 m (2,907 ft).

== See also ==
- List of mountains in Korea
