= 1st Infantry Division (United States) =

Active infantry division of the United States Army

- Insignia of the 1st Infantry Division
- Active: 24 May 1917 – present
- Country: United States of America
- Branch: United States Army
- Type: Combined arms
- Size: Division
- Part of: III Corps
- Garrison/HQ: Fort Riley, Kansas
- Nicknames: "The Big Red One" (abbreviated "BRO") "The Bloody First"
- Motto: No Mission Too Difficult. No Sacrifice Too Great. Duty First!
- March: "The Big Red One Song"
- Mascot: Rags
- Engagements: World War I; Montdidier-Noyon; Aisne-Marne; St. Mihiel; Meuse-Argonne; Lorraine 1917; Lorraine 1918; Picardy 1918; World War II; Algeria-French Morocco; Tunisia; Sicily; Northern France; Rhineland; Ardennes-Alsace; Central Europe; Vietnam; Gulf War; Defense of Saudi Arabia; Liberation of Kuwait; War on Terror; Iraq; Afghanistan; Operation Inherent Resolve
- Website: 1id.army.mil

Commanders
- Commanding General: BG Kevin J. Williams
- Deputy Commanding Officer (Maneuver): COL Jabari Miller
- Deputy Commanding Officer (Support): COL Ian J. Lauer
- Command Sergeant Major: CSM James Hughbanks
- Previous Commanders: Complete list

Insignia
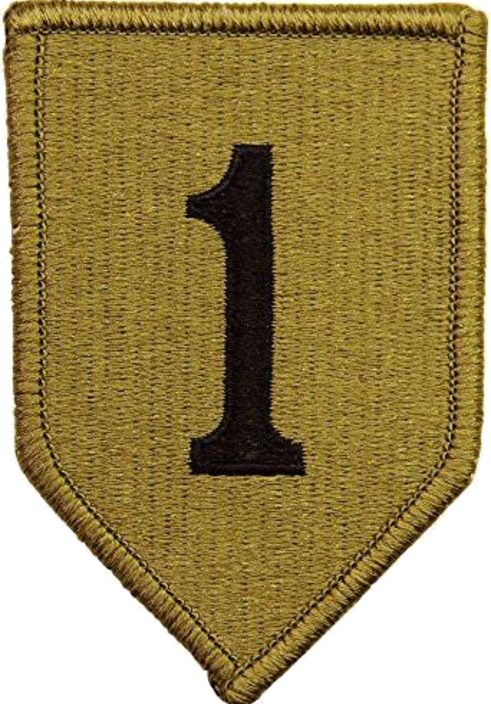
- Subdued shoulder sleeve insignia, worn on ACU

- Combat Service Identification Badge

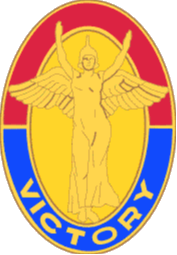
- Division Headquarters Insignia

- Flag

The 1st Infantry Division (1ID) is a combined arms division of the United States Army, and is the oldest continuously serving division in the Regular Army. It has seen continuous service since its organization in 1917 during World War I. It was officially nicknamed "The Big Red One" (abbreviated "BRO") after its shoulder patch and is also nicknamed "The Fighting First". The division has also received troop monikers of "The Big Dead One" and "The Bloody First" as puns on the respective officially sanctioned nicknames. It is currently based at Fort Riley, Kansas.

The 1st Infantry Division was first deployed to fight in France in World War I, fought extensively in Africa, Italy, France, and Germany during World War II, and participated extensively during United States' campaigns in the Vietnam War. The 1st Infantry was stationed in what became West Germany from 1945 to 1955, and its units rotated to West Germany throughout the remainder of the Cold War. It subsequently deployed to fight in the Gulf War, the Iraq War, and the War in Afghanistan. 37 members of the "Big Red One" have been awarded the Medal of Honor, making the 1st Infantry one of the U.S. Army's most honored divisions.

== History ==
=== World War I ===
A few weeks after the American entry into World War I, the First Expeditionary Division, later designated as the 1st Infantry Division, was constituted on 24 May 1917, in the Regular Army, and was organized on 8 June 1917, at Fort Jay, on Governors Island in New York harbor under the command of Brigadier General William L. Sibert, from Army units then in service on the Mexico–United States border and at various Army posts throughout the United States. The original table of organization and equipment (TO&E) included two organic infantry brigades of two infantry regiments each, one engineer battalion; one signal battalion; one trench mortar battery; one field artillery brigade of three field artillery regiments; one air squadron; and a full division train. The total authorized strength of this TO&E was 18,919 officers and enlisted men. George S. Patton, who served as the first headquarters commandant for the American Expeditionary Forces, oversaw much of the arrangements for the movement of the 1st Division to France, and their organization in-country. Frank W. Coe, who later served as Chief of Coast Artillery, was the division's first chief of staff.

The first units sailed from New York City and Hoboken, New Jersey, on 14 June 1917. Throughout the remainder of the year, the rest of the division had followed, landing at St. Nazaire, France, and Liverpool, England. After a brief stay in rest camps, the troops in England proceeded to France, landing at Le Havre. The last unit arrived in St. Nazaire 22 December. Upon arrival in France, the division, less its artillery, was assembled in the First (Gondrecourt) training area, and the artillery was at Le Valdahon.

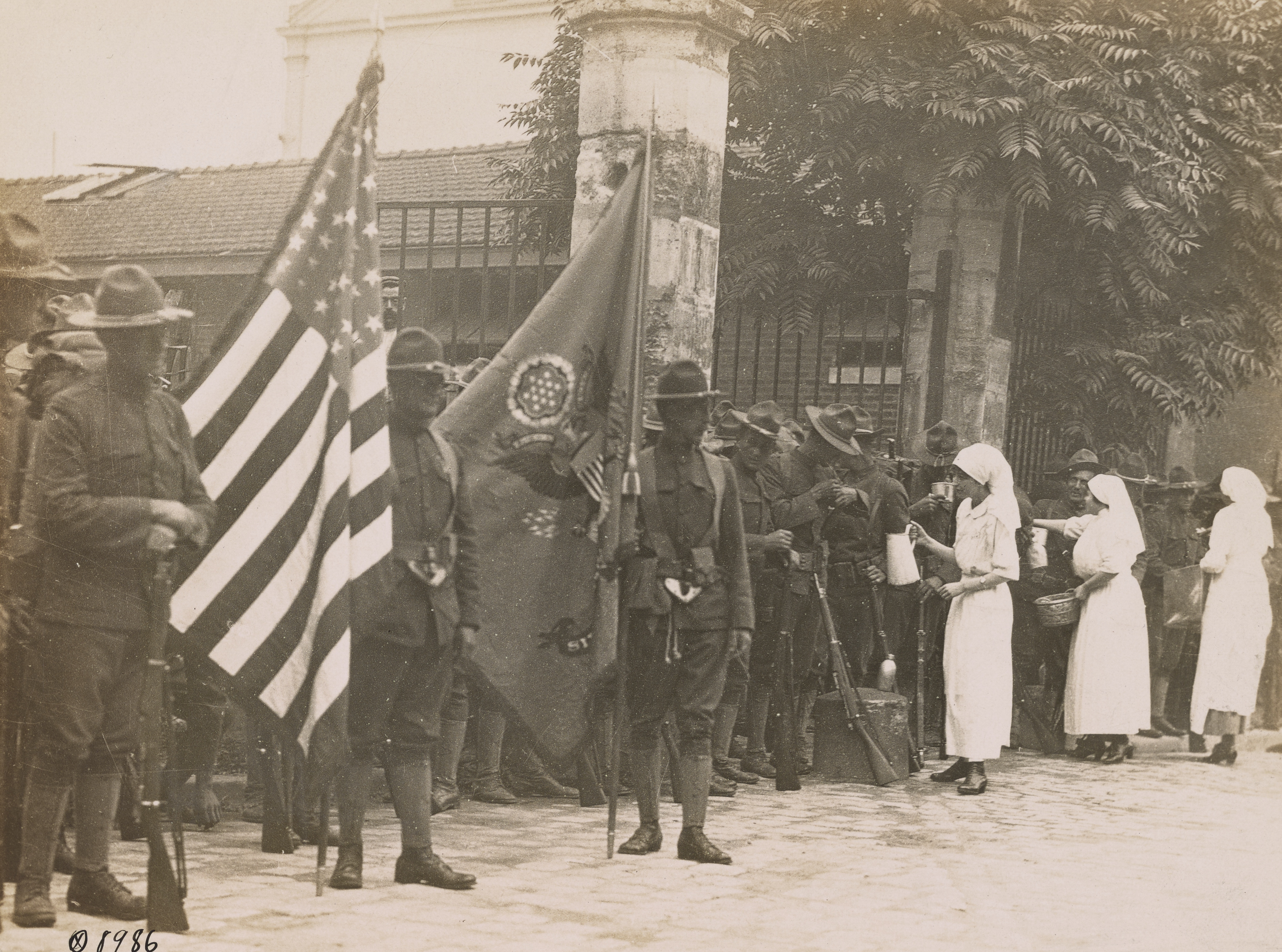
Red Cross nurses serving bread and coffee to doughboys of the 16th Infantry, 1st Division, upon their arrival in Paris, July 4, 1917.

On 4 July, the 2nd Battalion, 16th Infantry, paraded through the streets of Paris to bolster the sagging French spirits. An apocryphal story holds that at Lafayette's tomb, to the delight of the attending Parisians, Colonel Charles E. Stanton of the division's 16th Infantry Regiment stepped forward and declared, "Lafayette, nous sommes ici! [Lafayette, we are here!]" Two days later, on 6 July, Headquarters, First Expeditionary Division was redesignated as Headquarters, First Division, American Expeditionary Forces.

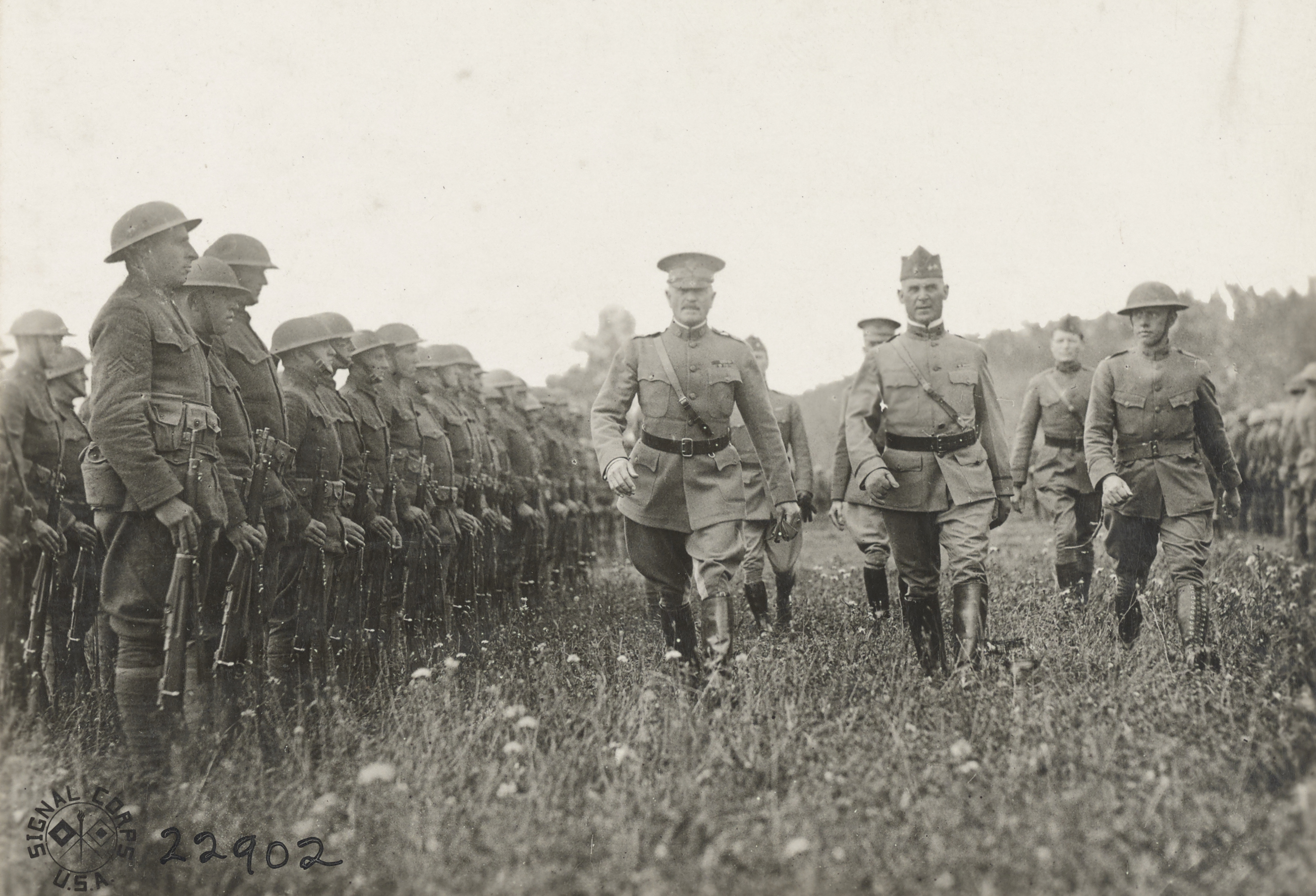
General John J. Pershing, Commander'in-Chief of the AEF, and Major General Charles P. Summerall, commander of the 1st Division, inspecting doughboys of the 16th Infantry, 1st Brigade, 1st Division, in France, September 7, 1918.

On 8 August 1917, the 1st Division adopted the "square" Table of Organization and Equipment (TO&E), which specified two organic infantry brigades of two infantry regiments each; one engineer regiment; one signal battalion; one machine gun battalion; one field artillery brigade of three field artillery regiments, and a complete division train. The total authorized strength of this new TO&E was 27,120 officers and enlisted men.

On the morning of 23 October, the first American shell of the war was fired towards German lines by a First Division artillery unit. Two days later, the 2nd Battalion of the 16th Infantry had suffered the first American casualties of the war.

By April 1918, the German Army had pushed to within 40 miles (64 km) of Paris. In reaction to this thrust, the division moved into the Picardy Sector to bolster the exhausted French First Army. To the division's front lay the small village of Cantigny, situated on the high ground overlooking a forested countryside. The 28th Infantry Regiment attacked the town, and within 45 minutes captured it along with 250 German soldiers. It was the first American victory of the war. The 28th was thereafter named the "Black Lions of Cantigny."

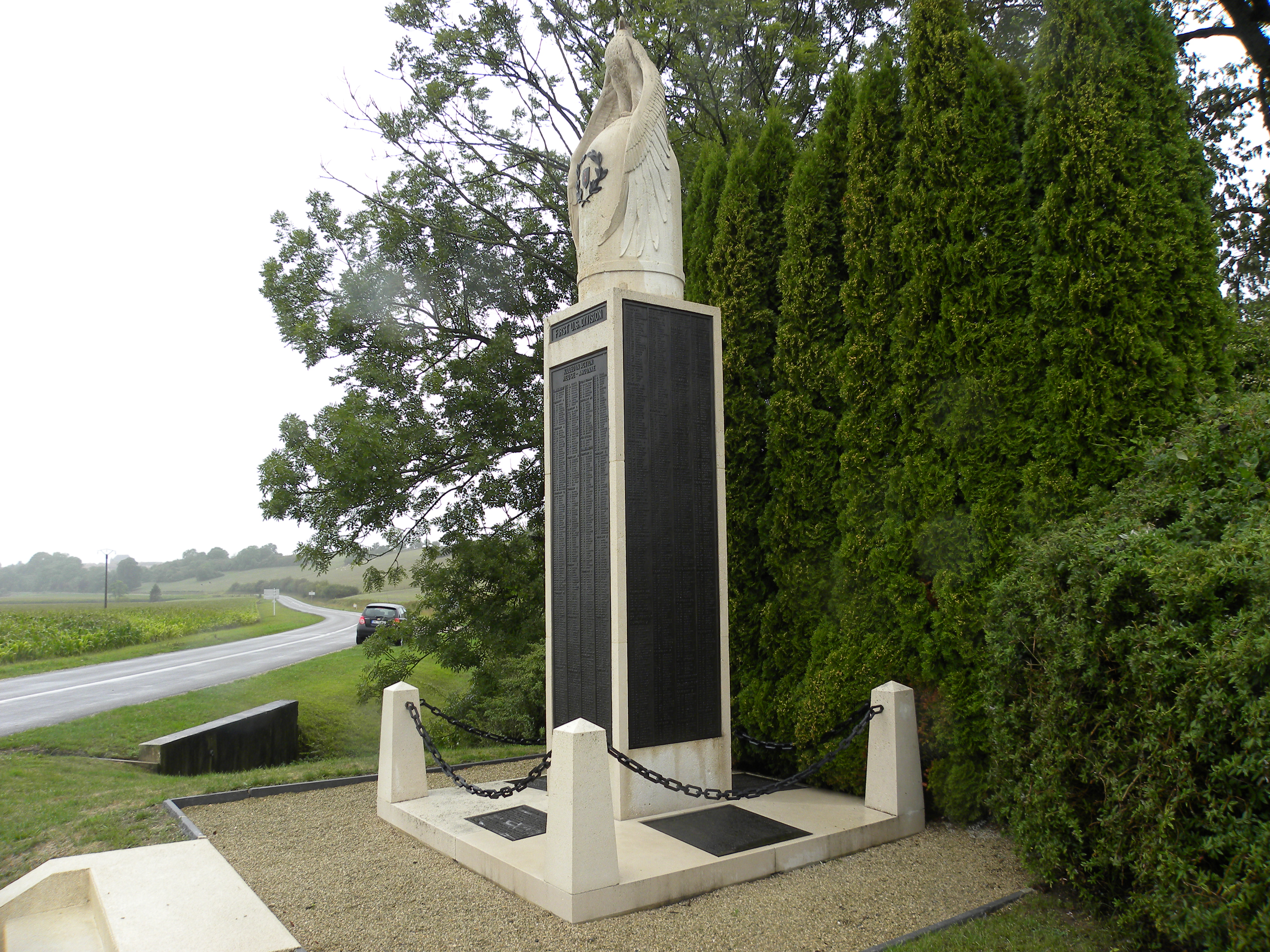
First Division monument on the Meuse-Argonne Battlefield, France.

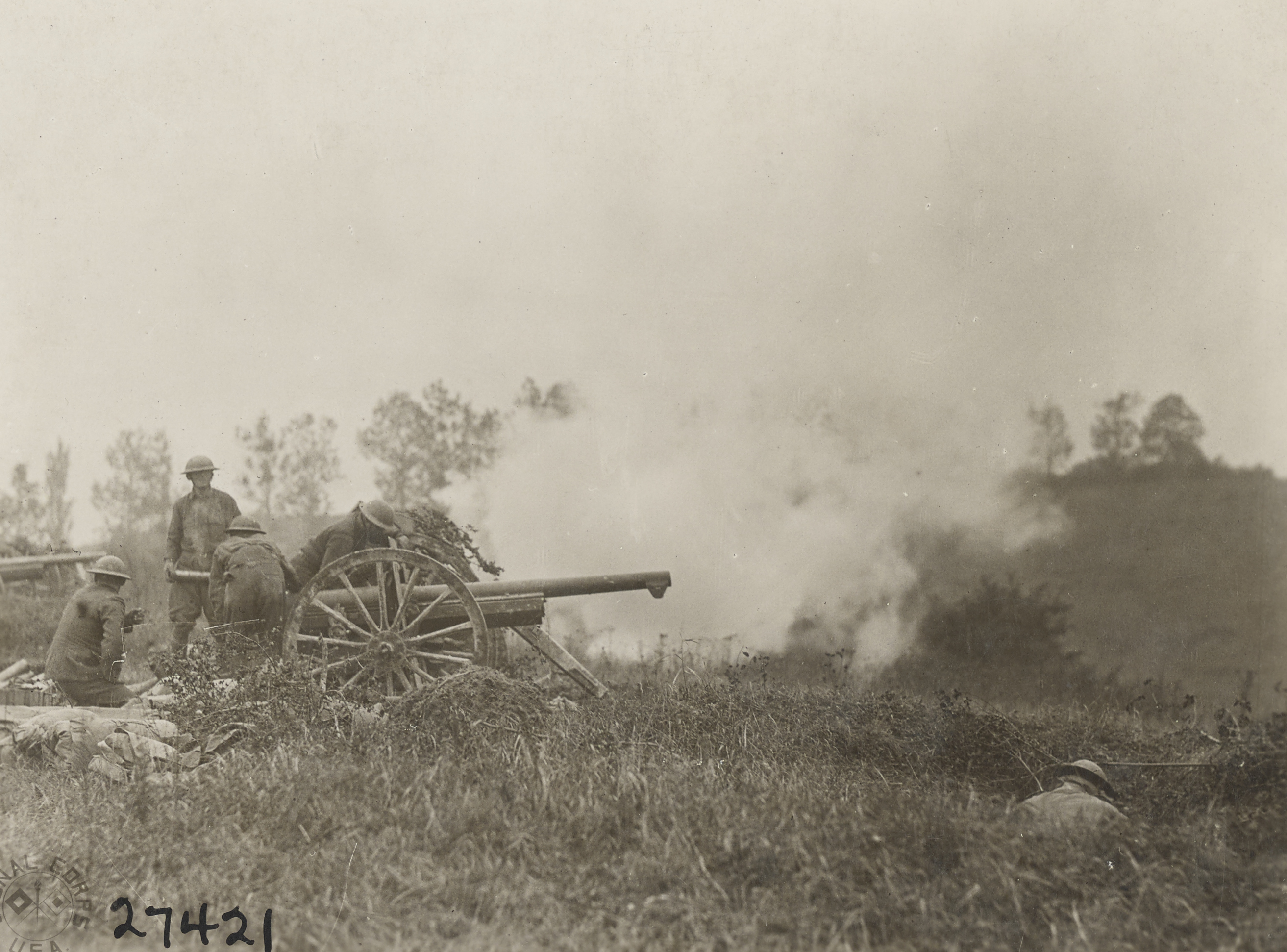
Gunners of the 6th Field Artillery, 1st Division, in action near Exermont, France, October 1918.

Soissons was taken by the 1st Division in July 1918. The Soisson's victory was costly – 700 men were killed or wounded. (One of them, Private Francis Lupo of Cincinnati, was missing in action for 85 years, until his remains were discovered on the former battlefield in 2003. The remains of Private First Class Charles McAllister, recovered with Francis Lupo were not identified and reburied until August 21, 2024). The 1st Division took part in the first offensive by an American army in the war, and helped to clear the Saint-Mihiel salient by fighting continuously from 11 to 13 September 1918. The last major World War I battle was fought in the Meuse-Argonne Forest. The division advanced a total of seven kilometers and defeated, in whole or part, eight German divisions. This victory was mainly due to the efforts of Colonel George C. Marshall, who began the war as the division's deputy chief of staff before being elevated to G-3 for the entire AEF in July 1918. Combat operations ended with the implementation of the terms of the Armistice on 11 November 1918. At the time the division was at Sedan, the farthest American penetration of the war, and was the first to cross the Rhine into occupied Germany.

By the end of the war, the division had reported it had suffered 4,964 killed in action, 17,201 wounded in action, and 1,056 missing or died of wounds. Five division soldiers received Medals of Honor.

The division's dog mascot was a mixed-breed terrier known as Rags. Rags was adopted by the division in 1918 and remained its mascot until his death in 1936. Rags achieved notoriety and celebrity as a war dog, after saving many lives in the crucial Argonne campaign by delivering a vital message despite being bombed and gassed.

==== Order of battle ====
- Headquarters, 1st Division
- 1st Infantry Brigade
  - 16th Infantry Regiment
  - 18th Infantry Regiment
  - 2nd Machine Gun Battalion
- 2nd Infantry Brigade
  - 26th Infantry Regiment
  - 28th Infantry Regiment
  - 3rd Machine Gun Battalion
- 1st Field Artillery Brigade
  - 5th Field Artillery Regiment (155 mm)
  - 6th Field Artillery Regiment (75 mm)
  - 7th Field Artillery Regiment (75 mm)
  - 1st Trench Mortar Battery
- 1st Machine Gun Battalion
- 1st Engineer Regiment
- 2nd Field Signal Battalion
- Headquarters Troop, 1st Division
- 1st Train Headquarters and Military Police
  - 1st Ammunition Train
  - 1st Supply Train
  - 1st Engineer Train
  - 1st Sanitary Train
    - 2nd, 3rd, 12th, and 13th Ambulance Companies and Field Hospitals)
  - 1st Military Police Company, 1st Division.

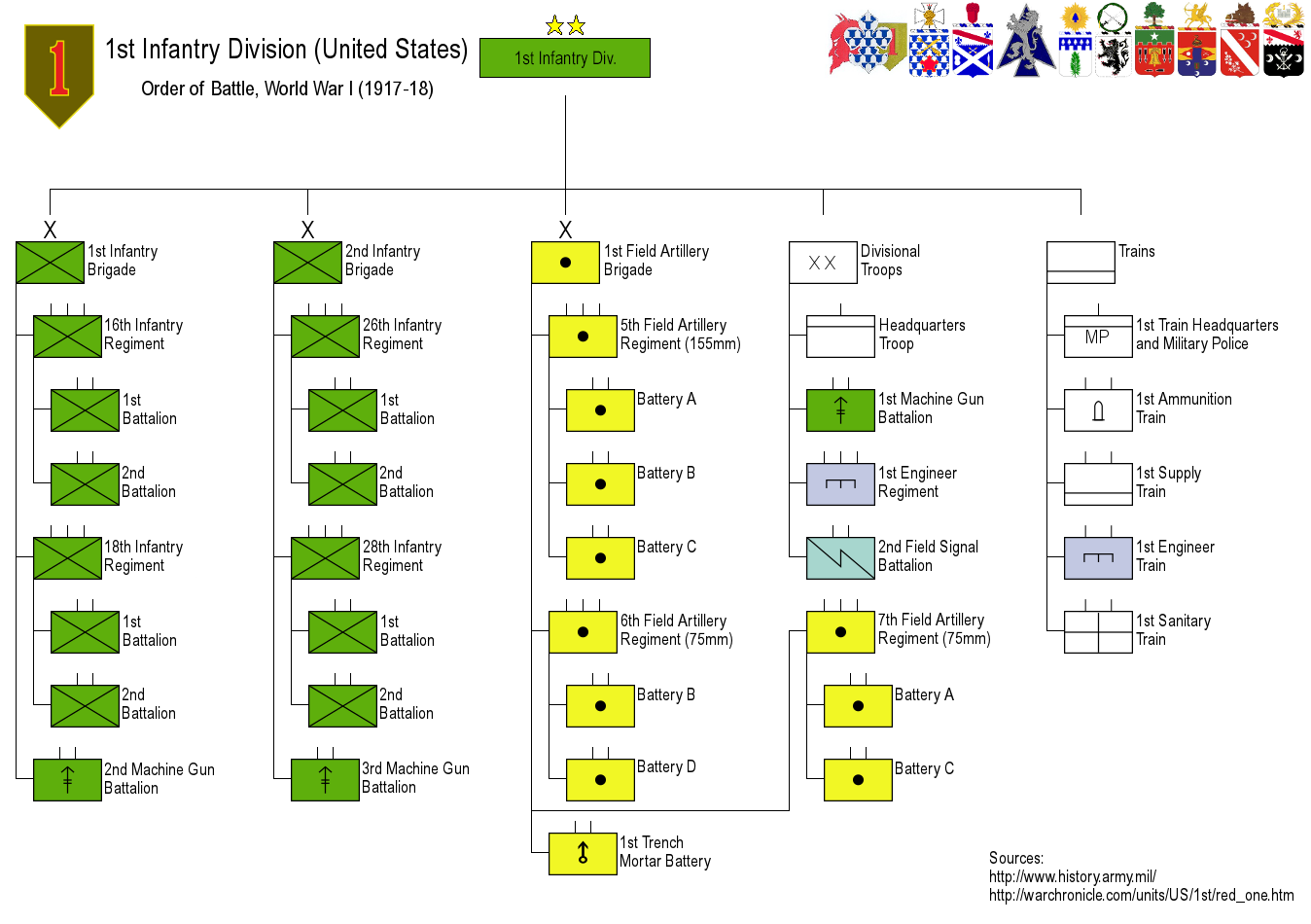
World War I order of battle

===== Attached units =====
====== En route to France and in 1st (Gondrecourt) Training Area ======
(as of 9 June – 23 September 1917)

- 5th Regiment USMC

====== Ménil-la-Tour Area 28 February – 3 April 1918 ======
- 1st Battalion, 2nd Engineers (2nd Division)

====== Cantigny Sector, at times from 27 April to 7 July 1918 ======
- French 228th Field Artillery Regiment (75 mm)
- French 253d Field Artillery Regiment (75 mm)
- 1st and 2nd Battalions of the French 258th Field Artillery Regiment (75 mm)
- 4th Battalion, Fr 301st Artillery Regiment (155 mm)
- One battery, French 3rd Cl Artillery Regiment (155 mm)
- 3rd and 4th Battalions, French 284th Artillery Regiment (220 mm)
- 2nd Battalion, French 289th Artillery Regiment (220 mm)
- One battery, Fr 3d Cl Artillery Regiment (220 mm)
- 6th Battalion, Fr 289th Artillery Regiment (280 mm)
- Two batteries Fr TM (58 mm)
- One battery Fr TM (150 mm)
- One battery Fr TM (240 mm)
- Fr 5th Tank Battalion (12 tanks)

====== Aisne-Marne Operation ======
(as of 18–23 July 1918)

- Fr 42d Aero Sq
- Fr 83d Bln Company
- Fr 253d FA-Portée (75 mm)
- Fr 11th and 12th Groups of Tanks

====== Saizerais Sector ======
(as of 8–24 August 1918)

- Fr 258th Aero Sq
- 6th and 7th Bln Companies
- 3 batteries Fr 247th FA- Portée
- Preceding and during the Saint-Mihiel Operation, at times from 8–14 September 1918
- 8th Observation Sq
- 9th Bln Company
- 58th Field Artillery Brigade and 108th Am Tn (33d Division)
- 76th Field Artillery (3d Division) (75 mm)
- Two batteries, 44th CA (8")
- Troops D, F, and H, 2nd Cavalry
- Two platoons, Company A, 1st Gas Regiment (Eight mortars)
- Two infantry battalions (42nd Division)
- 6th Infantry Brigade (3nd Division)
  - Two companies, 51st Pioneer Infantry
  - 7th MG Battalion (3d Division)
  - 49 tanks of 1st Tank Brigade

====== Meuse-Argonne Operation ======
(as of 1–2 October 1918)

- 60th Field Artillery Brigade
- 110th Am Tn (35th Division)

(as of 1–12 October 1918)

- 1st Aero Squadron
- 2d Bln Company
- Fr 219th Field Artillery (75 mm)
- Fr 247th Field Artillery (6 batteries 75 mm)
- Fr 5th Battalion 282d Artillery (220 mm)
- Provisional Squadron, 2d Cavalry
- Company C, 1st Gas Regiment
- Company C, 344th Tank Battalion, 1st Tank Brigade (16 tanks)
- Companies B and C, 345th Tank Battalion, 1st Tank Brigade (16 tanks)

(as of 7 October 1918)

- 362d Infantry (91st Division)

(as of 8–11 October 1918)

- 181st Infantry Brigade (91st Division)

====== Coblenz Bridgehead ======
- 14th Bln Company (18–30 June 1919)
- MG elements, Fr 2d Cavalry Division (18–30 June 1919)
- 4th MG Battalion (2d Division) 18–29 June 1919
- 7th MG Battalion (3d Division) 20–30 June 1919

====== Detached service ======
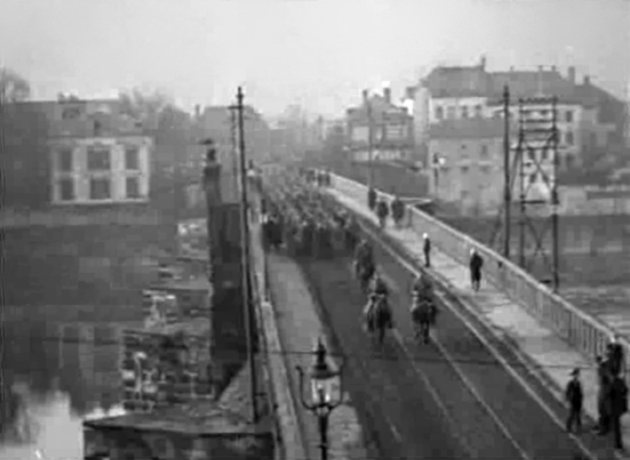
The 1st Infantry Division entering Trier, Germany, November 1918.

- At Le Valdahon 22 August – 18 October 1917 with 15th (Scottish) Division during the Second Battle of the Aisne, 24 July 1918 with U.S. 90th Division
  - 1st Field Artillery Brigade
  - 1st Am Tn
- With the 15th (Scottish) Division during Aisne-Marne Operation 24 July 1918 in Saizerais (Villers-en-Haye) Sector 24–28 August 1918;
  with 42nd Division in Meuse-Argonne Operation 13–31 October 1918;
  with 2nd Division in Meuse-Argonne Operation 1–4 November 1918.
  - 1st Sn Tn
- With III Corps 28 September – 2 October 1918
  - 1st Engineers
- With American forces in Germany after 9 August 1919.
  - 2d, 6th Field Artillery
  - Company A, 1st Engineers
  - Companies A, B, C, D, 1st Sup Tn
  - F Hosp 13

=== Interwar period ===
The 1st Division arrived at the port of Hoboken, New Jersey, in September 1919 after completing nine months of occupation duty near and in Koblenz, Germany. It participated that month in the Victory Parades in New York City on 10 September and Washington, D.C. on 17 September, then proceeded to Camp Meade, Maryland, where all emergency period personnel were discharged from the service. It then went to Camp Zachary Taylor, Kentucky, and took up temporary station there from 20 October 1919 to 8 October 1920. It dispatched elements of several regiments to quell striking coal miners in West Virginia in November 1919 and again to Lexington, Kentucky, in February 1920. It transferred in a permanent change of station to Camp Dix, New Jersey, where it arrived on 10 October 1920.

On 7 October 1920, the 1st Division organized under the new peacetime table of organization and equipment which included two organic infantry brigades of two infantry regiments each, a field artillery brigade of two (later three) field artillery regiments and an ammunition train, an engineer regiment; a medical regiment, a division quartermaster train, a special troops command, and an observation squadron. The total authorized strength of this TO&E was 19,385. The 1st Division was one of three Regular Army infantry divisions and one cavalry division that was authorized to nominally remain at "peacetime" strength. In 1921, the 1st Division was allotted to the Second Corps Area, and assigned to the II Corps. In August 1921, elements of the division were once again dispatched to West Virginia to control striking coal miners. In spring 1922, the division's units were ordered to posts throughout the northeastern United States, with most units arriving at their new duty stations in June and July 1922.

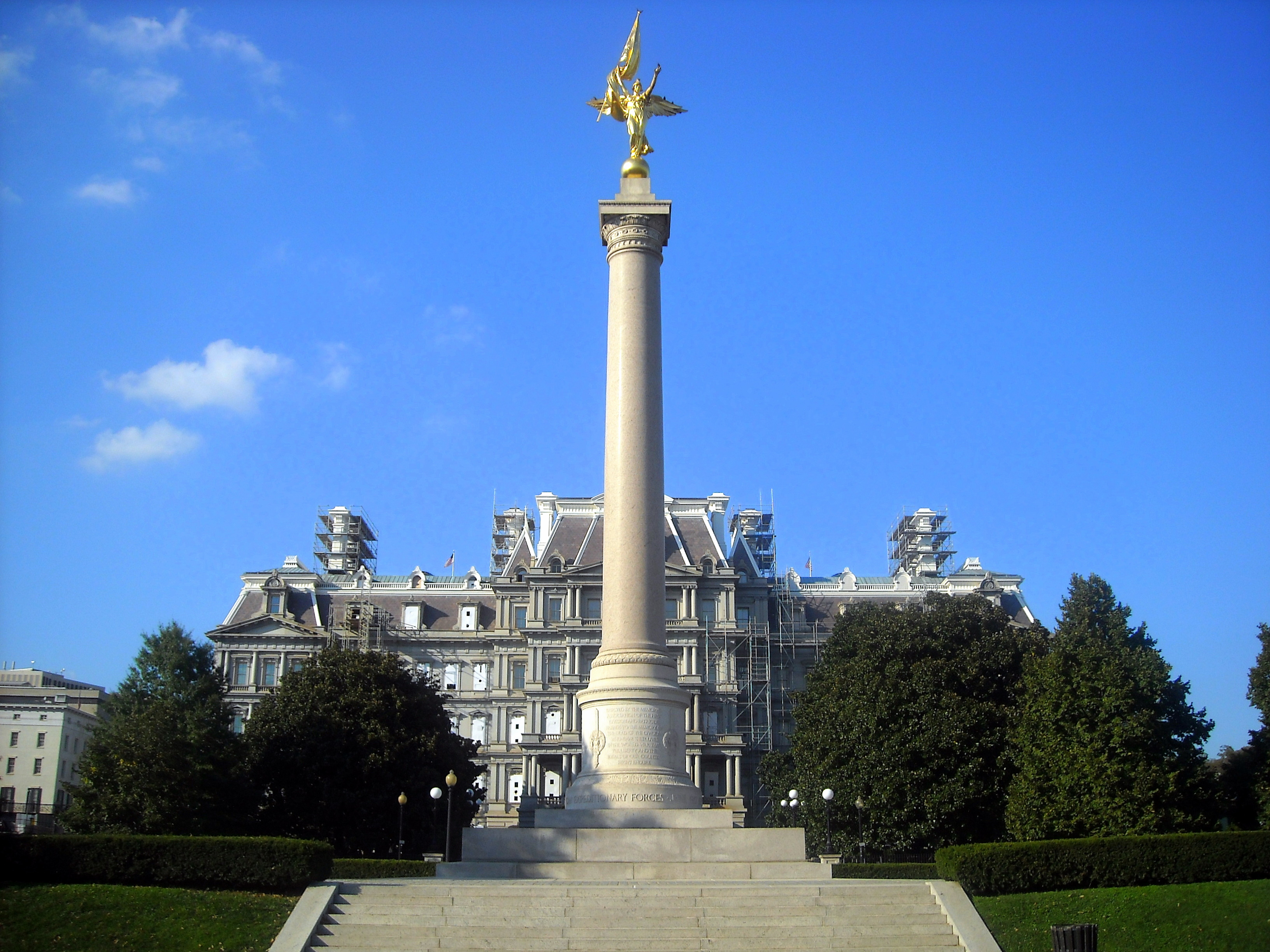
The First Division Monument located in President's Park, Washington, D.C.

The division headquarters was posted to Fort Hamilton, Brooklyn, New York, arriving there on 6 June 1922. The 1st Infantry Brigade and the division special troops were concentrated at posts in the New York City area, while the 2nd Infantry Brigade was scattered over posts in upstate New York. The 1st Field Artillery Brigade's units were spread from Fort Ethan Allen, Vermont, to Fort Hoyle, Maryland. By the mid-1920s, however, the division headquarters had nearly ceased to exist, with only the division commander and a few staff officers remaining to carry out essential functions; they did not exercise a true command function over their units. By 1926, the War Department and the Second Corps Area realized the unsustainability of the situation and repopulated the 1st Division headquarters. The training of the division's maneuver units took place, for the most part, in the late summer and early fall after they assisted the training of Organized Reserve units, the Citizens' Military Training Camps, and summer camps for ROTC cadets. The 1st Infantry Brigade conducted training each fall at Camp Dix, New Jersey, where the brigade also trained its affiliate Reserve units during the summer. The 2nd Infantry Brigade usually conducted the training of its Reserve units at the brigade's home posts, and afterwards, concentrated for training at Pine Camp, New York, in the fall. The first opportunity after 1922 to gather the division in one place came in 1927 when most of the division assembled at Camp Dix for various training events from August–November. To prepare the staff for the maneuver, the division held a CCX (command and communications exercise) at Camp Dix earlier that spring. The exercise was apparently very successful as similar CCXs were held periodically thereafter. The next major training event for the division came in August 1935 when the First and Second Corps Area elements of the First Army were assembled at Pine Camp for small unit maneuvers. This maneuver was followed in turn by the First Army command post exercise held at Fort Devens in August 1937. Shortly afterward, in September 1937, the division, minus the 2nd Infantry Brigade and some field artillery units, was concentrated at Indiantown Gap Military Reservation, Pennsylvania, for maneuvers. Concurrently, the 2nd Infantry Brigade, reinforced by the artillery units from Fort Ethan Allen and Madison Barracks, New York, assembled at Pine Camp for maneuvers.

These maneuvers were followed by the first of several amphibious operations performed by the division's units prior to World War II. The first landing exercises were held by division elements in Puerto Rico and Culebra Island in January and February 1938. The amphibious training was followed by the next First Army maneuver, held in the Plattsburg, New York, area in August 1939. In October 1939, the 1st Division adopted a new "triangular" peacetime TO&E which included three infantry regiments, a military police company, an engineer battalion, a signal company, a light field artillery regiment of three battalions and a medium field artillery regiment of two battalions, a medical battalion, and a quartermaster battalion. The authorized strength of this TO&E was 9,057 officers and enlisted men. In November 1939, the division deployed to Fort Benning, Georgia, where it was assigned temporarily to the IV Corps to train and test the new triangular organization. These exercises were held in preparation for maneuvers in Louisiana in May 1940 when the IV Corps was pitted against the provisional IX Corps.

After the exercises in Louisiana, the division returned to New York to participate in the 1940 First Army Maneuvers near Canton, New York, in August–September. For this maneuver, the 1st Division was again part of the II Corps. The 1st Division reorganized again on 1 November 1940 to a new TO&E, which added a reconnaissance troop, and put the two field artillery regiments under a division artillery command, raising its strength to a total of 15,245 officers and enlisted men. The two regiments were later reorganized into four battalions. In February 1941, the “Fighting First” was transferred to Fort Devens, Massachusetts, to concentrate for additional training. Concurrently, the division was relieved from the II Corps and assigned to the VI Corps. The following August, the division moved to the New River area of North Carolina for additional amphibious training. After the training at New River, the 1st Division participated in the Carolina Maneuvers held in November 1941 near Charlotte, North Carolina.

=== World War II ===
==== Division organization ====
The 1st Infantry Division consisted of the following units:

1st Infantry Division organization (click to enlarge)

- 1st Infantry Division
  - 1st Infantry Division Headquarters
  - 1st Cavalry Reconnaissance Troop (Mechanized) (M3 scout cars and then M8 Greyhound armored cars)
  - 16th Infantry Regiment
    - Headquarters and Headquarters Company
    - 3× Infantry battalions
      - each battalion consists of: 1× Headquarters and Headquarters Company, 3× Rifle companies, 1× Heavy Weapons Company
    - Cannon Company (T12 Gun Motor Carriages and T19 Howitzer Motor Carriages, later replaced by either M3 105mm towed howitzers or M7 Priest self propelled howitzers)
    - Anti-Tank Company (M3 37mm anti-tank guns, which were replaced by 1944 with M1 57mm anti-tank guns)
    - Service Company
  - 18th Infantry Regiment
    - same organization as 16th Infantry Regiment
  - 26th Infantry Regiment
    - same organization as 16th Infantry Regiment
  - 1st Infantry Division Artillery
    - Headquarters and Headquarters Battery
    - 5th Field Artillery Battalion
      - Headquarters and Headquarters Battery
      - 3× Batteries (M1 155mm towed howitzers)
      - Service Battery
    - 7th Field Artillery Battalion
      - Headquarters and Headquarters Battery
      - 3× Batteries (M2 105mm towed howitzers)
      - Service Battery
    - 32nd Field Artillery Battalion
      - same organization as 7th Field Artillery Battalion
    - 33rd Field Artillery Battalion
      - same organization as 7th Field Artillery Battalion
  - Headquarters Special Troops
    - Headquarters Company, 1st Infantry Division
    - 1st Signal Company
    - 1st Quartermaster Company
    - 701st Ordnance Light Maintenance Company
    - 1st Military Police Platoon
    - 1st Infantry Division Band (attached)
  - 1st Engineer Combat Battalion
    - Headquarters and Headquarters and Service Company
    - 3× Engineer combat companies
  - 1st Medical Battalion
    - Headquarters and Headquarters Detachment
    - 3× Collecting companies
    - Clearing Company

==== Combat chronicle ====
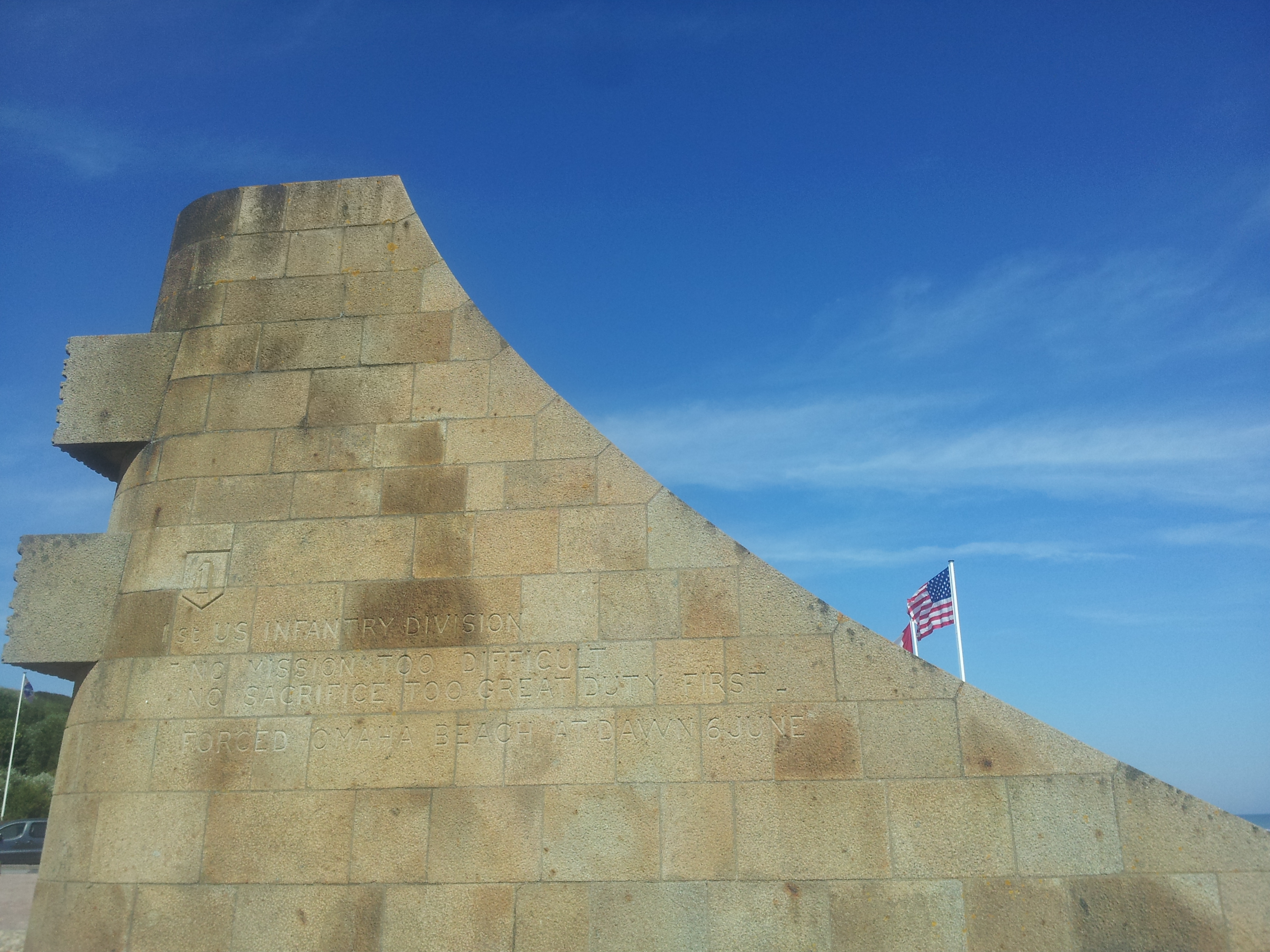
Monument to the 1st Infantry Division on Omaha Beach.

Shortly after the German invasion of Poland, beginning World War II in Europe, the 1st Infantry Division, under Major General Walter Short, was moved to Fort Benning, Georgia, on 19 November 1939 where it supported the U.S. Army Infantry School as part of American mobilization preparations. It then moved to the Sabine Parish, Louisiana area on 11 May 1940 to participate in the Louisiana Maneuvers. The division next relocated to Fort Hamilton, Brooklyn on 5 June 1940, where it spent over six months before moving to Fort Devens, Massachusetts, on 4 February 1941. As part of its training that year, the division participated in both Carolina Maneuvers of October and November before returning to Fort Devens, Massachusetts on 6 December 1941.

A day later, on 7 December 1941, the Japanese attacked Pearl Harbor and, four days later, Germany declared war on the United States, thus bringing the United States into the conflict. The division was ordered to Camp Blanding, Florida, as quickly as trains could be gathered and winter weather permitted, and arrived on 21 February 1942. The division, now under Major General Donald C. Cubbison, was there reorganized and refurbished with new equipment, being re-designated as the 1st Infantry Division on 15 May 1942. Within a week, the division was returned to its former post at Fort Benning, Georgia, from where it was expedited on 21 June 1942 to Indiantown Gap Military Reservation for wartime overseas deployment final preparation. The division, now under the command of Major General Terry Allen, a distinguished World War I veteran, departed the New York Port of Embarkation on 1 August 1942, arrived in Beaminster in south-west England about a week later, and departed 22 October 1942 for the combat amphibious assault of North Africa.

As part of II Corps, the division landed in Oran, Algeria on 8 November 1942 as part of Operation Torch, the Allied invasion of French North Africa. Elements of the division then took part in combat at Maktar, Tebourba, Medjez el Bab, the Battle of Kasserine Pass (where American forces were pushed back), and Gafsa. It then led the Allied assault in brutal fighting at El Guettar, Béja, and Mateur. The 1st Infantry Division was in combat in the Tunisian Campaign from 21 January 1943 to 9 May 1943, helping secure Tunisia. The campaign ended just days later, with the surrender of almost 250,000 Axis soldiers. After months of nearly continuous fighting, the division had a short rest before training for the next operation.

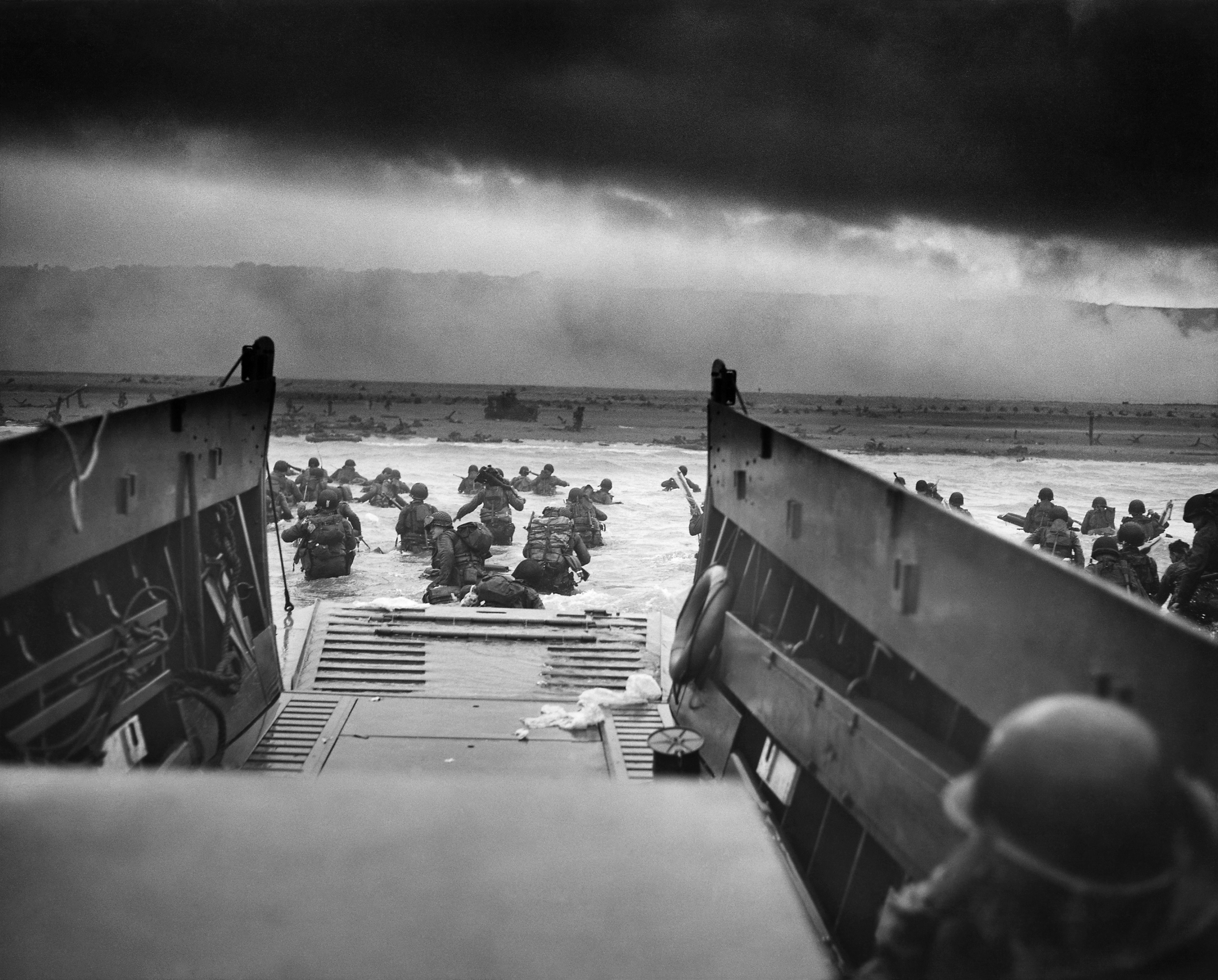
Into the Jaws of Death: A Coast Guard-staffed LCVP from the USS Samuel Chase disembarks Company A, 1st Battalion, 16th Infantry Regiment assaulting Omaha Beach on the morning of 6 June 1944.

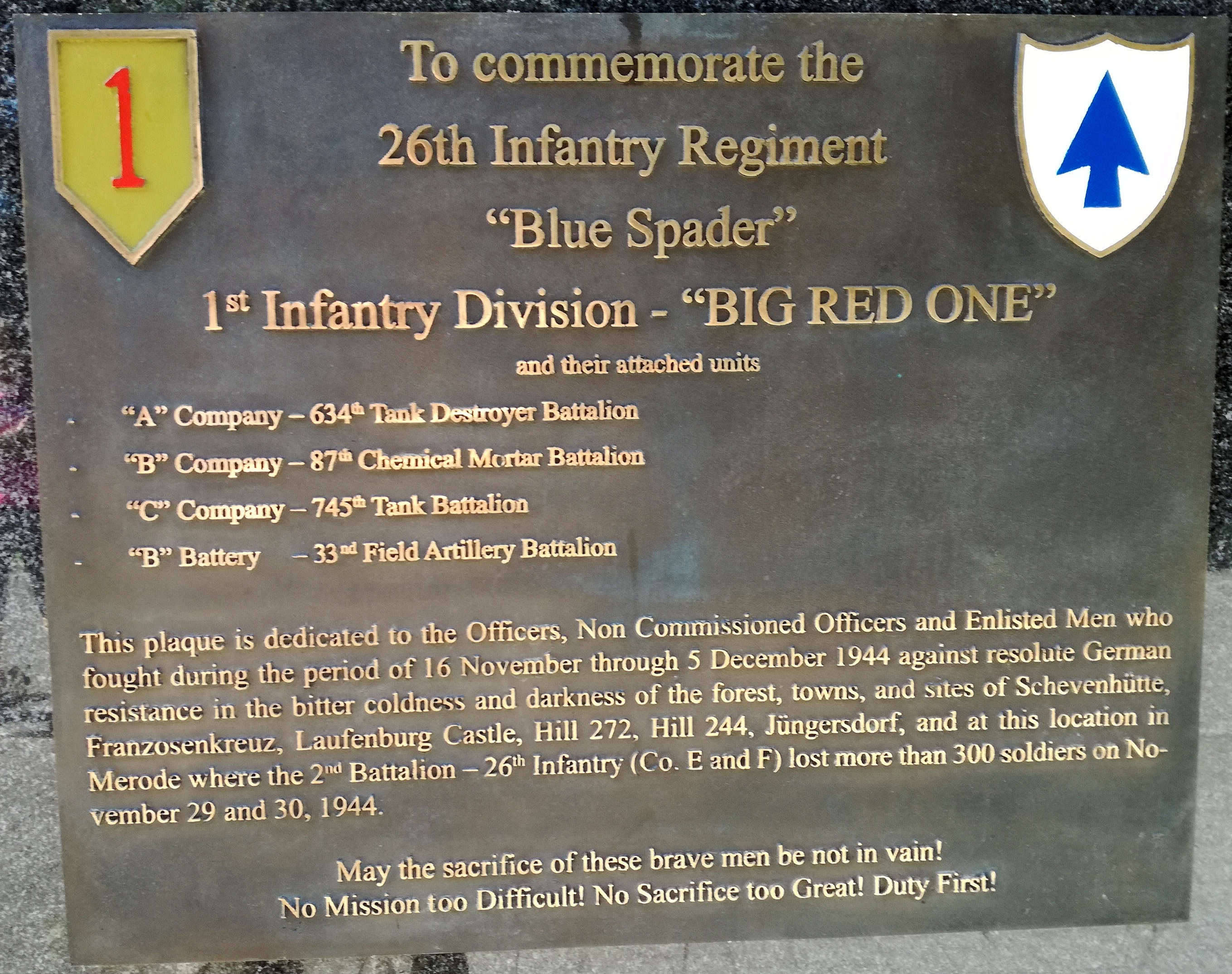
Commemorative plaque at a house in Merode, Germany remembering the soldiers of the 1st Infantry Division lost in action at Merode 1944.

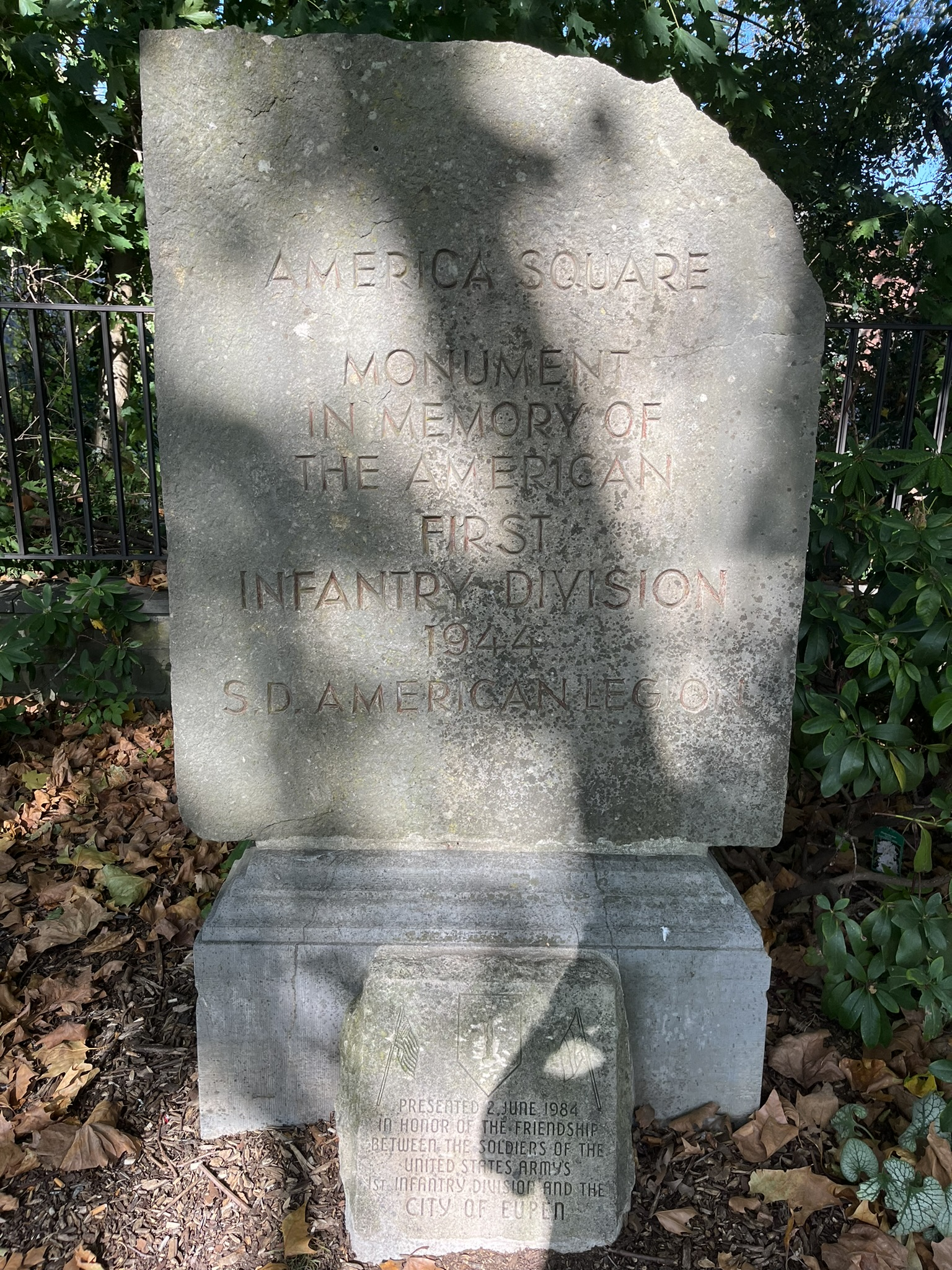
Stone commemorating the liberation of Eupen, Belgium by the 1st Infantry Division.

In July 1943, the division took part in the Allied invasion of Sicily, codenamed Operation Husky, still under the command of Major General Allen. Lieutenant General George S. Patton, commanding the U.S. Seventh Army, specifically requested the division as part of his forces for the invasion of Sicily. It was still assigned to the II Corps. In Sicily, the 1st Division saw heavy action when making amphibious landings opposed by Italian and German tanks at the Battle of Gela. The 1st Division then moved up through the center of Sicily, slogging it out through the mountains along with the 45th Infantry Division. In these mountains, the division saw some of the heaviest fighting in the entire Sicilian campaign at the Battle of Troina; some units lost more than half their strength in assaulting the mountain town. On 7 August 1943, Major General Allen was relieved of his command by Lieutenant General Omar Bradley, then commanding the II Corps. Allen was replaced by Major General Clarence R. Huebner who was, like Allen, a decorated veteran of World War I who had served with the 1st Infantry Division throughout the war.

When that campaign was over, the division returned to England, arriving there on 5 November 1943 to prepare for the eventual invasion of Normandy. One regimental combat team of 1st Infantry Division and one regimental combat team from the 29th Infantry Division as well as A, B, C companies of the 2nd Rangers Battalion and the 5th Rangers Battalion comprised the first wave of troops that assaulted German Army defenses on Omaha Beach on D-Day. The division had to run 300 yards to get to the bluffs, with some of the division's units suffering 30 percent casualties in the first hour of the assault, and secured Formigny and Caumont in the beachhead by the end of the day. The division followed up the Saint-Lô break-through with an attack on Marigny, 27 July 1944.

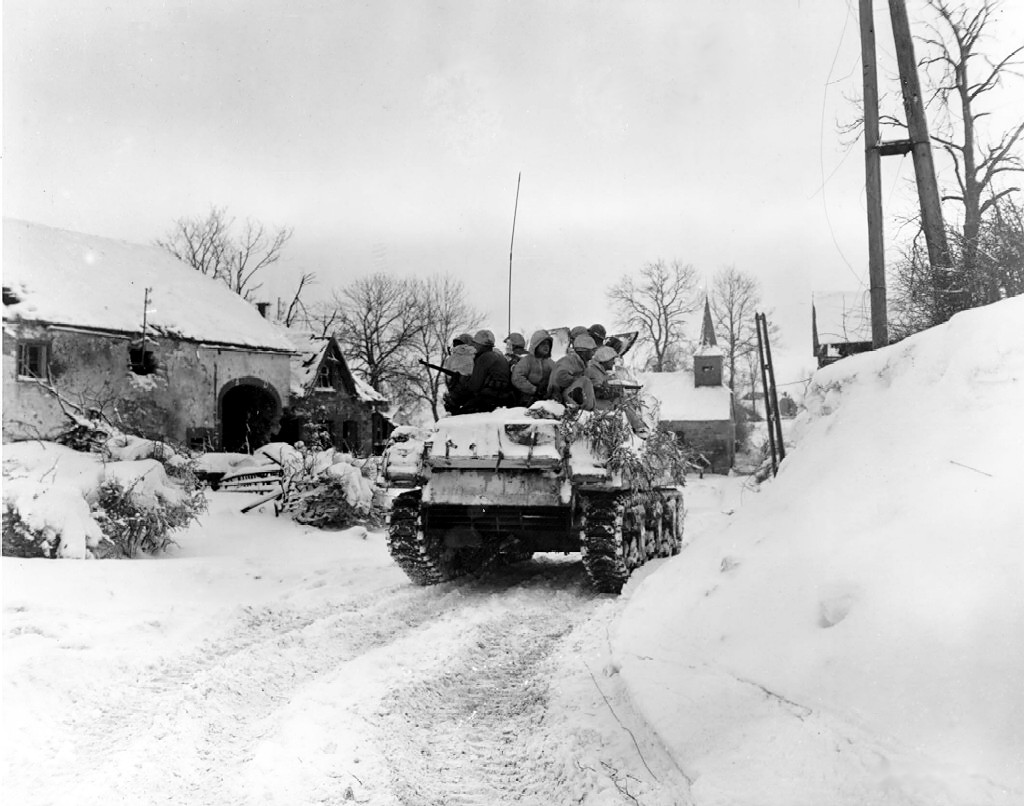
Members of 'I' Company of the 3rd Battalion, 16th Infantry Regiment ride on a tank during their advance on the town of Schopen, Belgium, 21 January 1945.

The division then drove across France in a continuous offensive. It took large numbers of prisoners during the Battle of the Mons Pocket, and reached the German border at Aachen in September, becoming one of the first units to fire artillery into German soil. The division laid siege to Aachen, taking the city after a direct assault on 21 October 1944. The 1st Division then attacked east of Aachen through the Hürtgen Forest, driving to the Ruhr, and was moved to a rear area 7 December 1944 for refitting and rest following 6 months of combat. When the German Wacht Am Rhein offensive (commonly called the Battle of the Bulge) was launched on 16 December 1944, the division, now commanded by Major General Clift Andrus, was quickly moved to the Ardennes front. Fighting continuously from 17 December 1944 to 28 January 1945, the division helped to blunt and reverse the German offensive. Thereupon, the division attacked and again breached the Siegfried Line, fought across the Ruhr, 23 February 1945, and drove on to the Rhine, crossing at the Remagen bridgehead, 15–16 March. The division broke out of the bridgehead, took part in the encirclement of the Ruhr Pocket, captured Paderborn, pushed through the Harz Mountains, and was in Czechoslovakia, fighting at Kynšperk nad Ohří, Prameny, and Mnichov (Domažlice District) when the war in Europe ended. Seventeen members of the division were awarded the Medal of Honor during World War II.

==== Casualties ====
- Total battle casualties: 20,659 (15,374 in Europe, 5,285 in North Africa and Sicily)
- Killed in action: 3,616 (2,713 in Europe, 903 in North Africa and Sicily)
- Wounded in action: 15,208 (11,527 in Europe, 3,681 in North Africa and Sicily)
- Missing in action: 499 (329 in Europe, 170 in North Africa and Sicily)
- Prisoner of war: 1,336 (805 in Europe, 531 in North Africa and Sicily)
- Days of Combat: 443 (292 in Europe, 151 in North Africa and Sicily)

==== Awards and prisoners taken ====
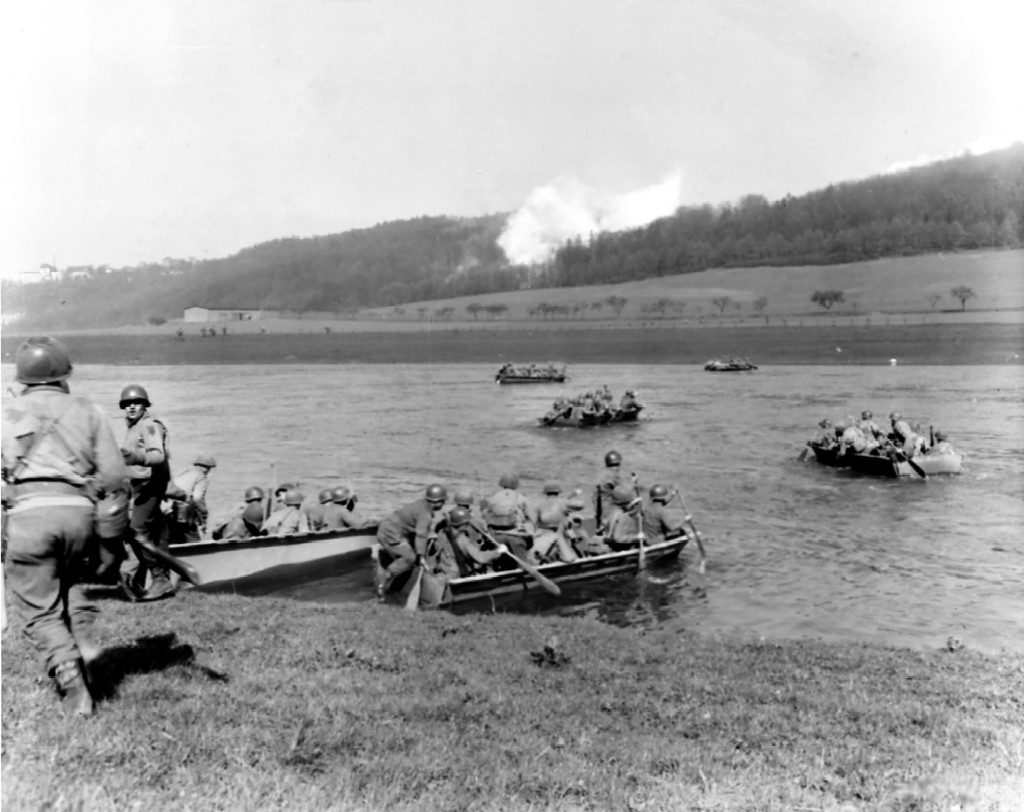
From newly captured town, members of the 16th Infantry Regiment, 1st Infantry Division, cross the Weser River in assault boats to take Furstenberg. 8 April 1945.

- Distinguished Unit Citation:
  - Company K, 18th Infantry Regiment, for action in combat on 23 March 1943 (War Department General Order No. 60, 1944)
  - 32nd Field Artillery Battalion, for action in combat from 21 to 24 March 1943 (War Department General Order No. 66, 1945)
  - 2nd Battalion, 18th Infantry Regiment, for action in combat on 23 April 1943 (War Department General Order No. 4, 1945)
  - 1st Battalion, 16th Infantry Regiment, for action in combat from 29 to 30 April 1943 (War Department General Order No. 60, 1944)
  - 2nd Battalion, 16th Infantry Regiment, for action in combat from 10 to 13 July 1943 (War Department General Order No. 60, 1944)
  - 1st Battalion, 16th Infantry Regiment, for action in combat from 10 to 14 July 1943 (War Department General Order No. 60, 1944)
  - Cannon Company, 16th Infantry Regiment, for action in combat from 11 to 13 July 1943 (War Department General Order No. 60, 1944)
  - 16th Infantry Regiment, for action in combat on 6 June 1944 (War Department General Order No. 73, 1944)
  - 18th Infantry Regiment, for action in combat from 6 to 16 June 1944 (War Department General Order No. 14, 1945)
  - 1st Battalion, 26th Infantry Regiment, for action in combat from 13 to 22 September 1944 (War Department General Order No. 42, 1945)
  - 18th Infantry Regiment, for action in combat from 8 to 10 October 1944 (War Department General Order No. 42, 1945)
  - 3rd Battalion, 18th Infantry Regiment, for action in combat from 8 to 19 October 1944 (War Department General Order No. 30, 1945)
  - Companies G and L, 16th Infantry Regiment, for action in combat from 15 to 17 October 1944 (War Department General Order No. 14, 1945)
  - 1st Battalion, 16th Infantry Regiment, for action in combat from 16 to 19 November 1944 (War Department General Order No. 120, 1946)
  - 2nd Battalion, 16th Infantry Regiment, for action in combat from 18 to 26 November 1944 (War Department General Order No. 120, 1946)
  - 3rd Battalion, 16th Infantry Regiment, for action in combat from 16 to 26 November 1944 (War Department General Order No. 120, 1946)
  - Company F, 18th Infantry Regiment, for action in combat on 2 February 1945 (War Department General Order No. 29, 1946)
- Medal of Honor: 17
- DSC: 131
- Legion of Merit: 16
- Silver Star: 4,258
- Soldiers Medal: 100
- Bronze Star: 12,568
- Air Medal: 65
- Prisoners taken: 188,382
- Days of Combat: 443

==== Assignments in European and North African theaters ====
1. 1 February 1943: II Corps, British First Army, 18th Army Group
2. July 1943: US II Corps, U.S. Seventh Army, 15th Army Group
3. 1 November 1943: US First Army. (Note: In these tabulations, the army and higher headquarters to which the division is assigned or attached is not repeated when the division is assigned or attached to a different corps in the same army. On 6 November 1943, for example, the 1st Infantry Division was assigned to the VII Corps which was itself assigned to First Army; on 1 August 1944, the 12th Army Group became operational; and on 6 May 1945, the 1st Infantry Division left First Army for the first time during the operations on the Continent for reassignment to the Third Army.)
4. 6 November 1943: VII Corps.
5. 2 February 1944: V Corps, First Army, British 21st Army Group
6. 14 July 1944: US First Army.
7. 15 July 1944: VII Corps, First Army.
8. 1 August 1944: VII Corps, First Army, 12th Army Group.
9. 16 December 1944: V Corps, First Army, 12th Army Group.
10. 20 December 1944: Attached, with the entire First Army, to the British 21st Army Group.
11. 26 January 1945: XVIII Airborne Corps, First Army, 12th Army Group.
12. 12 February 1945: III Corps.
13. 8 March 1945: VII Corps, First Army, 12th Army Group.
14. 27 April 1945: VIII Corps.
15. 30 April 1945: V Corps, First Army, 12th Army Group.
16. 6 May 1945: United States Third Army, 12th Army Group.

=== Cold War ===
==== Korean War ====
During the Korean War, the Big Red One was assigned to occupation duty in Germany, while acting as a strategic deterrent against Soviet designs on Europe. 1st Infantry Division troops secured the Nuremberg War Crimes Trials and later transported seven convicted Nazi war criminals to Spandau Prison in Berlin.

In 1955, the division colors left Germany and were relocated to Fort Riley, Kansas.

==== 1950s–1970s ====
Following its return from Germany, the 1st Infantry Division established headquarters at Fort Riley, Kansas. Its troops reorganized and trained for war at Fort Riley and at other posts. In 1962 and 1963, four 1st Infantry Division Pentomic battle groups (2nd Battle Group, 12th Infantry; 1st Battle Group, 13th Infantry; 1st Battle Group, 28th Infantry; and 2d Battle Group, 26th Infantry) rotated, in turn, to West Berlin, Germany to augment the U.S. Army's Berlin Brigade during an international crisis initiated by the construction of the Berlin Wall. These "Long Thrust Operations" were the most significant deployments conducted by 1st Infantry Division troops during the Cold War, placing Big Red One troops in confrontation with hostile communist forces.

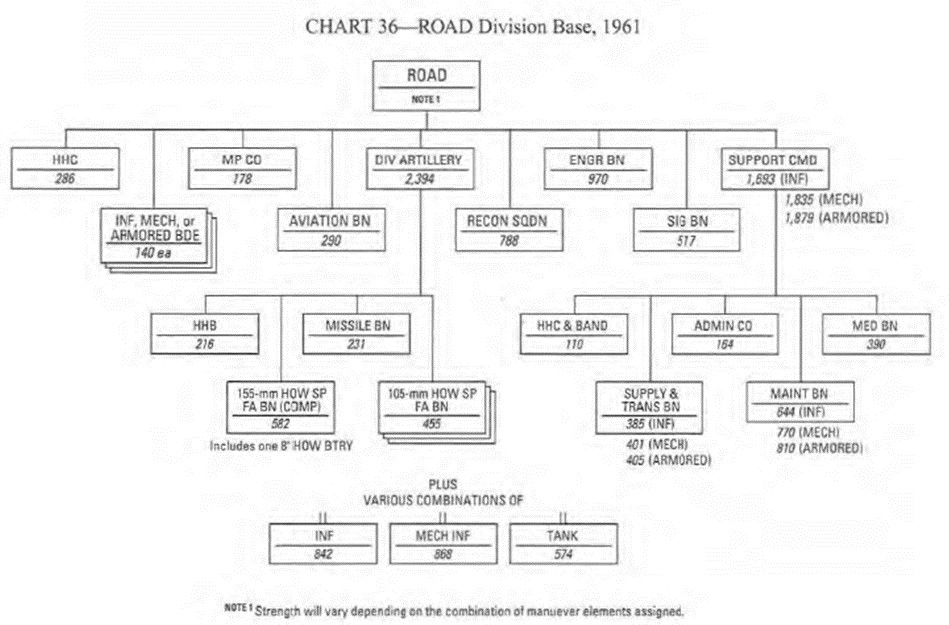
Standard organization chart for a ROAD division

From President Kennedy's approval on 25 May 1961, the Army divisions began to convert to the "Reorganization Objective Army Division 1965" (ROAD) structure in early 1962.

==== Vietnam War ====
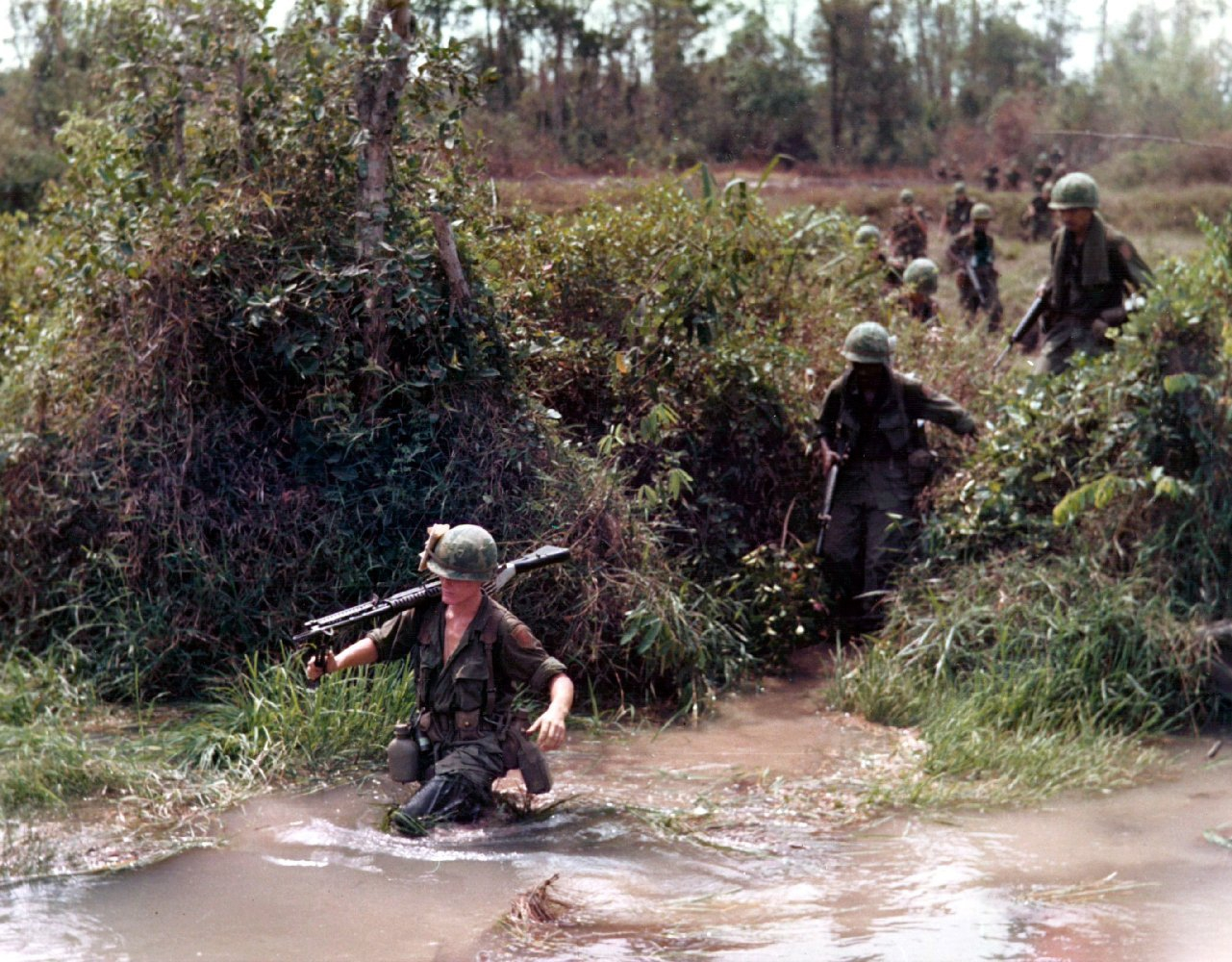
1st Infantry Division soldiers during an operation in South Vietnam in 1968

The division fought in the Vietnam War from 1965 to 1970. Arriving in July 1965, the division began combat operations within two weeks. By the end of 1965, the division had participated in three major operations: Hump, Bushmaster 1 and Bushmaster II, under the command of MG Jonathan O. Seaman.

In 1966, the division took part in Operation Marauder, Operation Crimp II and Operation Rolling Stone, all in the early part of the year. In March, Major General William E. DePuy took command. In June and July the division took part in the battles of Ap Tau O, Srok Dong and Minh Thanh Road. In November 1966, the division participated in Operation Attleboro.

1967 saw the division in Operation Cedar Falls, Operation Junction City, Operation Manhattan, Operation Billings, and Operation Shenandoah II. MG John H. Hay assumed command in February. On 17 June 1967, during Operation Billings, the division suffered 185 casualties, 35 killed and 150 wounded in the battle of Xom Bo II. Three months later on 17 October 1967, the division suffered heavy casualties at the Battle of Ong Thanh with 58 killed.

The division was involved in the Tet Offensive of 1968, securing the massive Tan Son Nhut Air Base. In March, MG Keith L. Ware took command. That same month the division took part in Operation Quyet Thang ("Resolve to Win") and in April the division participated in the largest operation of the Vietnam War, Operation Toan Thang ("Certain Victory"). On 13 September Ware was killed in action when his command helicopter was shot down by enemy anti-aircraft fire during the Battle of Lộc Ninh. MG Orwin C. Talbott moved up from his position of assistant division commander to assume command of the division.

In the first half of 1969, the division conducted reconnaissance-in-force and ambush operations, including a multi-divisional Operation Atlas Wedge. The last part of the year saw the division take part in Dong Tien ("Progress Together") operations. These operations were intended to assist South Vietnamese forces to take a more active role in combat. In August, MG Albert E. Milloy took command of the division while the division took part in battles along National Highway 13, known as Thunder Road to the end of the year.

In January 1970 it was announced that the division would return to Fort Riley. The division officially departed South Vietnam on 7 April 1970, when the division commander Brigadier General John Q. Henion, left Bien Hoa Air Base and returned the colors to Fort Riley. 11 members of the division were awarded the Medal of Honor. During its involvement in the Vietnam War, the division lost 6,146 killed in action, with a further 16,019 wounded. Twenty of its number were taken as prisoners of war.

Order of Battle in Vietnam

1st Brigade, 1st Inf Div Oct 1965 – Apr 1970

1st Bn/16th Inf Oct 1965 – Nov 1966 1st Bn/28th Inf Oct 1965 – Apr 1970 2nd Bn/28th Inf Oct 1965 – Nov 1966 1st Bn/2nd Inf Dec 1966 – Apr 1970 1st Bn/26th Inf Dec 1966 – Jan 1970 2nd Bn(M)/2nd Inf Feb 1970 – Apr 1970 2nd Bn/28th Inf [2] Feb 1970 – Apr 1970 1st Bn/5th Art (105mm How) DS 1st Bde Oct 1965 – Apr 1970

2nd Brigade, 1st Inf Div Jul 1965 – Apr 1970

2nd Bn/16th Inf Jul 1965 – Apr 1970 1st Bn/18th Inf Jul 1965 – Jan 1970 2nd Bn/18th Inf Jul 1965 – Apr 1970 1st Bn(M)/16th Inf Feb 1970 – Apr 1970 1st Bn/7th Art (105mm How) DS 2nd Bde Oct 1965* – Apr 1970

- Thus, the brigade had no artillery battalion for the period Jul – Sep 1965.

3rd Brigade, 1st Inf Div Oct 1965 – Apr 1970

1st Bn/2nd Inf Oct 1965 – Nov 1966 2nd Bn/2nd Inf Oct 1965 – Feb 1969 mechanized by Jan 1965 1st Bn/26th Inf Oct 1965 – Nov 1966 1st Bn/16th Inf Dec 1966 – Jan 1970 mechanized ca Oct 1968 2nd Bn/28th Inf Dec 1966 – Jan 1970 2nd Bn(M)/2nd Inf [2] Apr 1969 – Jan 1970 1st Bn/18th Inf Feb 1970 – Apr 1970 1st Bn/26th Inf Feb 1970 – Apr 1970 2nd Bn/33rd Art (105mm How) DS 3rd Bde Oct 1965 – Apr 1970

2nd Bn (M)/2nd Inf with 1st Cavalry Division Mar 1969

==== REFORGER ====
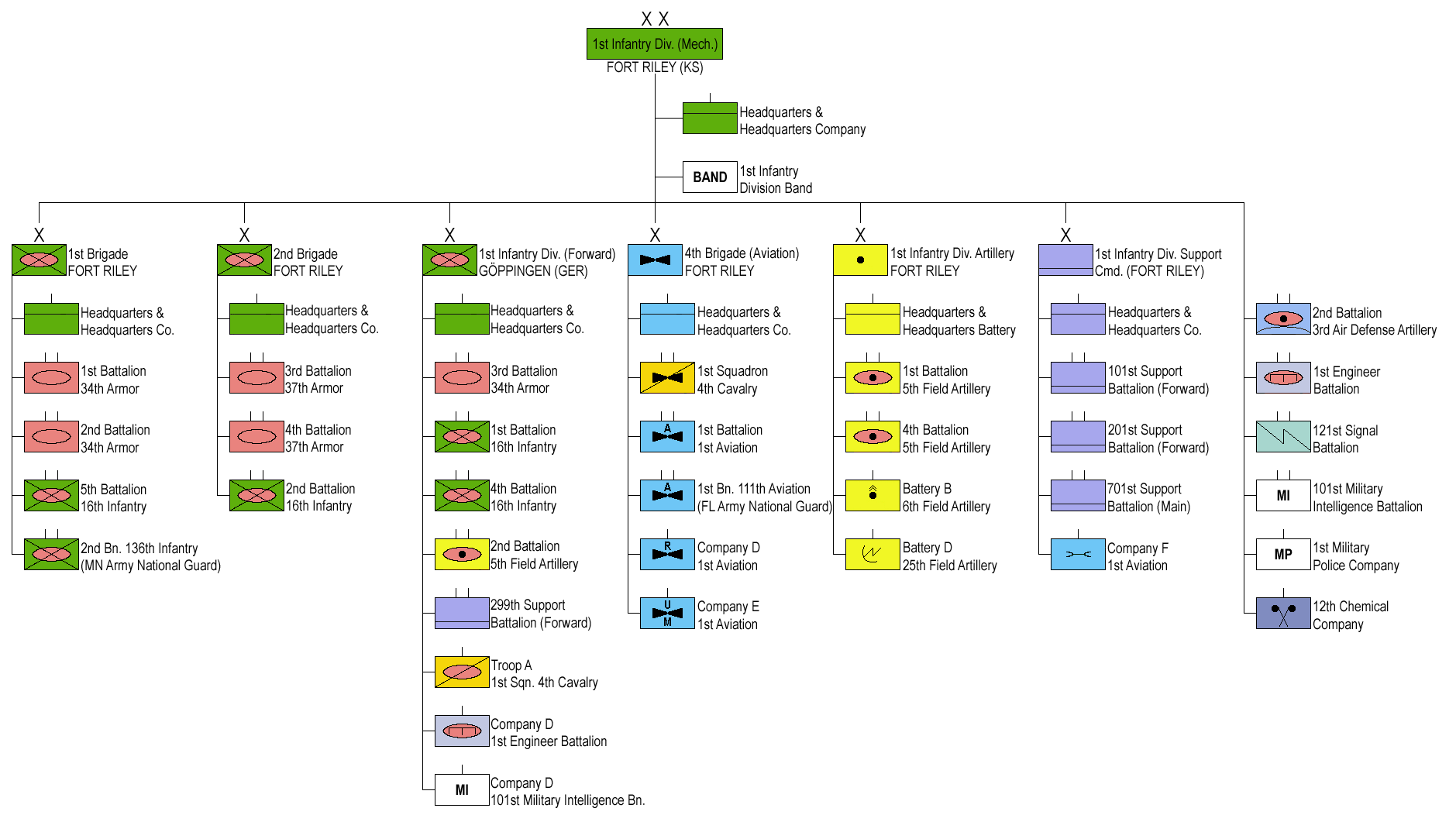
1st Infantry Division (Mechanized) structure 1989 (click to enlarge)

The colour party returned from South Vietnam to Kansas. In April 1970 the bulk of the division was moved to Fort Riley by "reflagging" the 24th Infantry Division.

The division's 3d Brigade, the Division Forward replacement component of REFORGER for the inactivated 24th Infantry Division, a mixture of cavalry and infantry, was forward-deployed to Germany. The brigade was initially stationed at Sheridan Kaserne, Augsburg, later moving to Cooke Barracks in Göppingen, with four battalions (two infantry, two armor) and the 1st Squadron, 4th Cavalry stationed in Stuttgart/Boeblingen (Panzer Kaserne) and the field artillery battalion in Neu Ulm (Wiley Kaserne) with the 1st Battalion, 26th Infantry in Göppingen and the 3d Battalion, 63d Armor in Augsburg. The Division Forward was inactivated on 15 August 1991 and the Big Red One became a two-brigade division with an assigned National Guard "roundout" brigade.

The division participated in REFORGER (Return of Forces in Germany) in all years. REFORGER was the largest set of NATO ground maneuvers since the end of World War II. The group performed surveillance on the border of Czechoslovakia and Germany during the Cold War.

=== Post-Cold War era ===
==== First Gulf War ====
The division, commanded by Major General Thomas G. Rhame, also participated in Operation Desert Storm. The division's two maneuver brigades from Fort Riley were rounded out by the addition of two tank battalions (2nd and 3rd, 66th Armor), an infantry battalion (1-41st Infantry), and a field artillery battalion (4-3 FA) from 2nd Armored Division (Forward) in Germany. The division played a significant role in the Battle of Norfolk. Specific combat arms and combat support units of the 3rd Battalion, 37th Armor and others were responsible for the initial breach of the Iraqi defenses providing subsequent passages for the rest of VII Corps, consequently rolling over the Iraqi 26th Infantry Division and taking 2,600 prisoners of war. The division continued with the subsequent 260-kilometer (160 mi) long assault on Iraqi-held territory over 100 hours, engaging eleven Iraqi divisions, destroying 550 tanks, 480 armored personnel carriers and taking 11,400 prisoners. 1st Infantry Division Artillery, including 4-3 FA battalion, was decisive during combat operations performing multiple raids and fire missions. These combat operations resulted in the destruction of 50 enemy tanks, 139 APCs, 30 air defense systems, 152 artillery pieces, 27 missile launchers, 108 mortars, 548 wheeled vehicles, 61 trench lines and bunker positions, 92 dug-in and open infantry targets, and 34 logistical sites. By the early morning of 28 February 1991, the division had taken position along the "Highway of Death", preventing any Iraqi retreat. The division's HHC, Alpha, Bravo, Charlie and Delta 3/37 Armor, HHC, Alpha, Bravo, Charlie and Delta 4/37 Armor, and 1st Squadron, 4th Cavalry Regiment (1/4 CAV), was then tasked with securing the town of Safwan, Iraq, and the airfield there where the Iraqis were later forced to sign the surrender agreement.

Valorous Unit citation:

For extraordinary heroism during ground combat operations in Operation Desert Storm from 24 February 1991 through 4 March 1991. Organized as Task Force 3/37th Armor, the Unit was composed of HHC, B, and C Companies, 3/37th Armor; A and D Company, Second Battalion, Sixteenth Infantry; First Platoon of B Company and Second Platoon of C Company, Second Battalion, Third Air Defense Artillery; C Company, First Engineer Battalion; and Ground Surveillance Radar Team B, One Hundred and First Military Intelligence Battalion. As part of the First Infantry Division (Mechanized) and VII Corps main effort, Task Forces 3/37th Armor, 2/16th infantry and 4/37th armor breached the Iraqi defense on 24 February 1991, clearing four passage lanes and expanding the gap under direct enemy fire. The task force then attacked 300 kilometers (190 mi) across southern Iraq into northern Kuwait, severing Iraqi lines of communication, and then drove north once again in the middle of the night (with primitive GPS), into Iraq to assist in the seizure of the airfield at the City of Safwan, Iraq the next morning and the securing of that airfield for the Coalition Forces-Iraqi Cease-Fire negotiations or "peace talks". During the operation, over fifty enemy combat vehicles were destroyed and over 1700 prisoners were captured. Throughout the Ground War, the soldiers performed with marked distinction under difficult and hazardous conditions. Their gallantry, determination, and Esprit de Corps guaranteed victory and maintained the finest traditions of the United States Army.

There was also the "bulldozer assault", wherein the 1st and 2nd Brigades from the 1st Infantry Division (Mechanized) used mine plows mounted on tanks and combat earthmovers to bury Iraqi soldiers defending the fortified "Saddam Line." While approximately 2,000 men surrendered, escaping death, one newspaper story reported that U.S. commanders estimated thousands of Iraqi soldiers had been buried alive during the two-day assault over the period 24–25 February 1991.

In 1996 the division colors were relocated to the German city of Würzburg (replacing the 3rd Infantry Division, which had relocated to Fort Stewart, GA). The division would remain in Germany until 2006, when the colors were struck and moved (again) to Fort Riley, Kansas.

==== Balkans ====
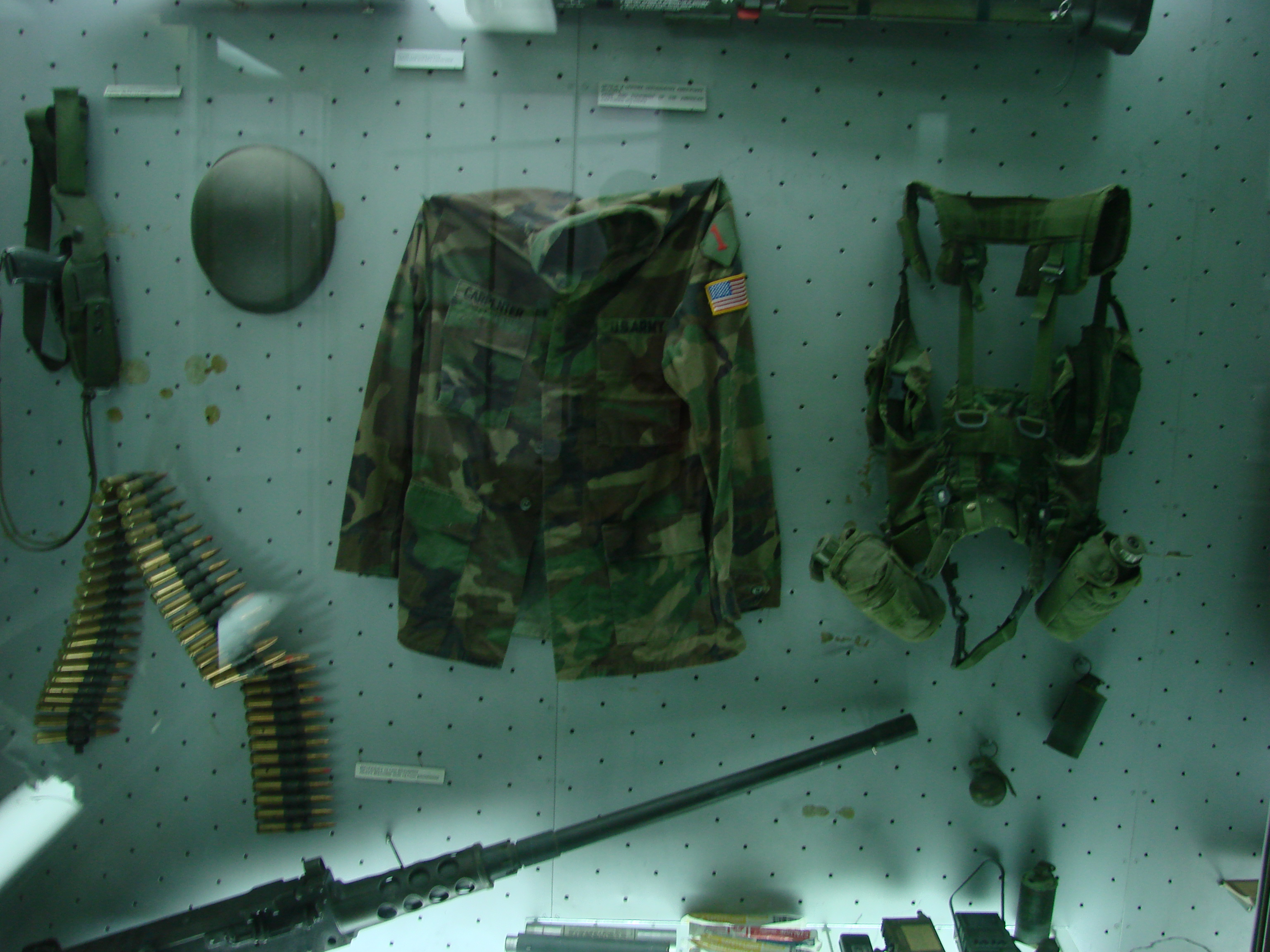
Captured equipment from 1st ID soldier on display in Belgrade museum

The divisional cavalry squadron, 1st Squadron 4th US Cavalry, deployed to Bosnia as part of the initial IFOR mission from January to December 1996. The Squadron was based in Camp Alicia near the town of Kalesija. 2nd (Dagger) Brigade Combat Team deployed to Bosnia as part of IFOR (and subsequent SFOR) from October 1996 to April 1997. The 2nd Brigade was replaced by elements from the 3rd Brigade and the division's aviation brigade. Units from the 1st (Devil) Brigade Combat Team were also deployed to Bosnia as part of SFOR6 ("Operation Joint Forge") from August 1999 to April 2000.

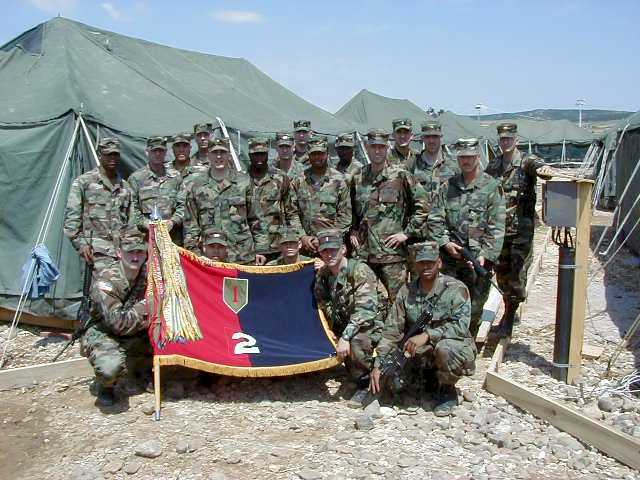
Kosovo, 1999, 2BDE/1st Div

Elements of the division, including personnel and units from the 2nd, 3rd and aviation brigades, served in Kosovo. During the Kosovo War, three soldiers were captured by Serbian forces but were later released after peace talks.

Units of the 1st Infantry Division served in Kosovo as part of the NATO-led Kosovo Force (KFOR) 1A and KFOR 1B from June 1999 to June 2000, then again for KFOR 4A and 4B from May 2002 to July 2003.

==== Iraq 2003 and 2004 ====
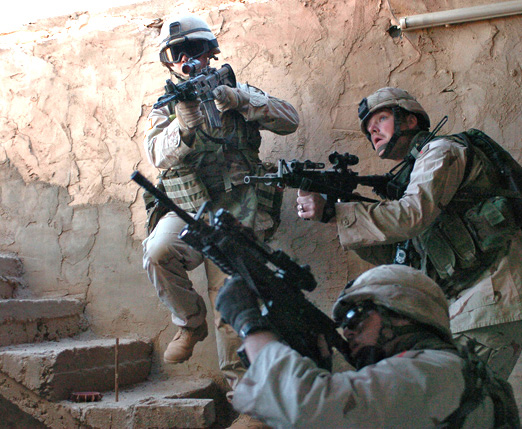
Soldiers from 1st Infantry Division clearing a building in Fallujah, 19 November 2004.

In January 2003, the division headquarters deployed to Turkey to command and control Army Forces Turkey (ARFOR-T) with a mission to receive and move the 4th Infantry Division across Turkey and into Northern Iraq. The task organization included HHC Division, 1–4 Cavalry, 1–26 Infantry, 1–6 Field Artillery, 2-1 Aviation, HHC Engineer Brigade, 9th Engineers, HHC DISCOM, 701 Main Support Battalion, 601 Aviation Support Battalion, 4-3 Air Defense Artillery, 101 Military Intelligence Battalion, 121 Signal Battalion, 12th Chemical Company, and other US Army Europe units to include the Theater Support Command. The division opened three seaports, two airports, three command posts, and convoy support centers along a 500-mile route from the Turkish coast, through Mardin, to the Northern Iraqi border. When the Turkish government voted to deny US ground forces access to Turkey, ARFOR-T collapsed the line of communication and redeployed to Germany home stations in April 2003.

1-63 Armor of the 3rd Brigade Combat Team deployed to Kirkuk, Iraq from Rose Barracks, Germany, during the first-ever deployment of the USAREUR (United States Army Europe) Immediate Ready Task Force (IRTF) in March 2003, in support of the 173rd Airborne Brigade. The battalion redeployed to Europe with the 173rd in March 2004.

The 1st Brigade, 1st Infantry Division deployed from Fort Riley, Kansas in September 2003 to provide support to the 82nd Airborne Division in the city of Ramadi, Iraq. In September 2004, the 1st Brigade was replaced by elements from the 2nd Infantry Division in Ramadi and redeployed to Ft. Riley.

In January 2004, the division less the 1st Brigade Combat Team deployed from home stations in Germany to Iraq, where it conducted an area relief with the 4th Infantry Division in the Salah ad-Din, Diyala, Kirkuk and Sulaymaniyah provinces, with the division headquarters located on Forward Operating Base Danger, in Saddam Hussein's hometown of Tikrit. Task Force Danger, as the division was called during OIF2, was augmented with the 2nd Brigade, 25th Infantry Division, the 30th Heavy Brigade Combat Team of the North Carolina Army National Guard, the 264th Engineer Group of the Wisconsin Army National Guard, the 167th Corps Support Group, 1st ROC (USAR), and the 2nd Battalion, 108th Infantry Regiment of the New York Army National Guard. The 2nd Brigade Combat Team was headquartered in Tikrit, the 3rd Brigade Combat Team was headquartered outside Baqubah, and the 30th BCT was headquartered in Kirkuk. The 4th Brigade and Division Support Command were based at Forward Operating Base Speicher north of Tikrit. Task Force Danger conducted counterinsurgency operations, including the full spectrum of combat, peace enforcement, training and equipping Iraqi security forces, support to Iraqi institutions to improve quality of life, and two national elections. Major combat included operations in Baqubah, Samarra, Bayji, Najaf, Al Diwaniyah, and Fallujah. In February 2005, the division facilitated an area relief with the 42d Infantry Division, New York National Guard, and elements of the 3rd Infantry Division and redeployed to home stations in Germany.

==== Rebasing to US ====
In July 2006 the division was withdrawn from Germany back to Fort Riley in CONUS, leaving only the 2nd (Dagger) Brigade in Schweinfurt, Germany until 28 March 2008 when the 3rd Brigade, 1st Armored Division was reorganized and re-designated as the 2nd Brigade, 1st Infantry Division.

==== Iraq 2006–2008 ====
The 2nd (Dagger) Brigade Combat Team deployed to Iraq from mid-August 2006 to late November 2007. 1st Battalion, 26th Infantry Regiment was the first to embark and was sent to the Adhamiya district of Baghdad to assist in suppressing the widespread sectarian violence. The 1st Battalion, 77th Armor Regiment was deployed to Ramadi and the 1st Battalion, 18th Infantry Regiment was sent to Forward Operating Base Falcon in the Al Rashid district of southwest Baghdad. HQ and HQ Company 2BCT, 1st ID, 9th Engineer Battalion, 1st Battalion, 7th Field Artillery Regiment, 299th Support Battalion, C/101 MI BN, and 57th Signal Company were all (Dagger) units occupying Camp Liberty, a sprawling encampment of 30,000+ military and DoD civilians located just east of Baghdad International Airport (BIAP). 2BCT MP PLT (formerly 2nd Platoon, 1st Military Police Company) was located at FOB (Forward Operating Base) Justice. During the 15-month deployment, 61 soldiers from the brigade were killed, including 31 from 1–26 infantry, which had the most casualties in any single battalion since the Vietnam War.

Elements from Fort Riley's 1st (Devil) Brigade deployed in the fall of 2006 to other areas of operations in Iraq. Units include companies from the 1st Battalion, 16th Infantry; 1st Battalion, 34th Armor; 1st Battalion, 5th Field Artillery; 1st Engineer Battalion; and D Troop, 4th Cavalry.

==== Transition team training mission ====
State-side training for the military transition teams (MiTTs) is located at Fort Riley, Kansas. Training began 1 June 2006. Some of the units such as the 18th Infantry Regiment, the 26th Infantry Regiment, and the 16th Infantry Regiment have already gone into Afghanistan along with some reconnaissance units. Those units have been in the Kunar Province since mid-2006. As of fall 2009, the transition team training mission has moved to Fort Polk, and the 1st Brigade has transitioned into a combat-ready force with possible plans to deploy in the next few years.

==== Iraq 2007 ====
In February 2007, the 4th Infantry Brigade Combat Team deployed to southern Baghdad in support of Operation Iraqi Freedom, becoming The second unit tasked with the "surge" announced earlier in the year by President Bush. The main force of the brigade was under Col Ricky Gibbs at FOB Falcon. 2nd Battalion, 16th Infantry was put under operational control of the 2nd Brigade, 2nd Infantry Division, and located at FOB Rustamiyah (Featured in the Book "The Good Soldiers" by Washington Post reporter David Finkel)

In the fall of 2007, the Combat Aviation Brigade (Demon Brigade), 1st Infantry Division deployed to Iraq and was placed under the command of Multinational Division – North located at COB Spiecher. The majority of the CAB is stationed at COB Spiecher, with the 1st Squadron, 6th Cavalry Regiment and some supporting elements stationed at FOB Warrior.

==== Afghanistan 2008–2009 ====
In June and July 2008, the 3rd Brigade, "Duke", deployed to Eastern Afghanistan under the command of CJTF-101, relieving the 173rd Airborne Brigade and taking control of the Kunar, Nuristan, Nangarhar, and Laghman provinces. One of the brigade's infantry battalions, 2nd Battalion, 2nd Infantry, was tasked out down south in the Kandahar province outside of the brigade command. The 6th Squadron, 4th Cavalry Regiment was tasked with securing the Kunar Valley. Combat Outposts Keating and Lowell were engaged in combat on nearly a daily basis while Observation Posts Hatchet and Mace disrupted Taliban supply lines and took the brunt of attacks from the east out of Pakistan. They were involved in the infamous Battle of Bari Alai, where 3 American soldiers and 2 Latvian soldiers were killed. The battle lasted over the course of 4 days where the fatigued soldiers of Charlie Troop and Hatchet Troop were continuously harassed by Taliban fighters after retaking the observation post. 6-4 Cavalry had the most casualties of the brigade with the exception of the 1st Battalion, 26th Infantry Regiment, who were continuously engaged with the Taliban in the Korengal Valley. CNN branded the brigade "The Dying Duke" because of the brutality and high casualty rate of the unit in their time in theater. The main focuses of the brigade and PRT were to protect population centers such as Jalalabad and Asadabad and help develop the local economy through the construction of roads, and provide security while doing so. The brigade returned to Ft. Hood, Texas in July 2009 after a year of combat in which they recorded over 2000 firefights, over 3000 enemy killed, over 1000 bombs dropped, 26,000 rounds of artillery fired and over 500 Purple Hearts awarded.

==== Iraq 2008–2009 ====
In October 2008, the 2nd Heavy Brigade Combat Team deployed to northwest Baghdad in support of Operation Iraqi Freedom. The brigade HQ was located on VBC (Victory Base Complex) and the brigade was responsible for the NW quarter of Baghdad. During this deployment soldiers of the 1st CAB (Combined Arms Battalion), 18th Infantry Regiment were located on FOB Justice. The 1st CAB, 63rd Armor was initially located in Mah-Muh-Diyah (south of Baghdad) and then relocated to JSS Nasir wa Salam (NWS) in the Abu Ghraib area to the west of Baghdad. 5th Squadron, 4th Cavalry was located in the Ghazaliyah area of West Baghdad where they battled the 1920s Revolutionary Brigade and eventually wrested control of the area from them. The 1st Battalion, 7th Field Artillery was located on FOB Prosperity within the "Green Zone", and the 2nd Brigade Special Troops Battalion located in the Victory Base Complex. During this deployment, the 4th Squadron, 10th Cavalry, 2nd Battalion, 8th (US) Cavalry Regiment was attached to the brigade for several months, as well as the 1st Battalion, 41st Field Artillery, and a battalion from the 56th Stryker Brigade Combat Team (PAARNG).

The most notable events which occurred during this time were the Iraqi provincial elections, the expiration of the UN Mandate and the corresponding implementation of the security agreement (SA), between the Government of Iraq and the United States, and "Bloody Wednesday" 19 August 2009 coordinated bombing of the finance ministry and the foreign ministry, with rocket attacks in the green zone. The bombings resulted in 101 dead and over 560 wounded. The Dagger Brigade experienced constant, albeit minor, enemy contact during this deployment – although the brigade still had two KIAs (one serving as the brigade deputy commander's personal security detachment and one from the attached PAARNG battalion) and numerous WIA. During this deployment, LTC J.B. Richardson III (commander of 5–4 CAV) earned a Bronze Star for Valor for single-handedly assaulting through an enemy RKG-3 ambush and inflicting multiple casualties on the enemy.

==== Iraq 2009–2010 ====
4th Infantry Brigade Combat Team (Dragons) deployed in August 2009 as one of the last combat units to be deployed to Iraq. Under the Command of Colonel Henry A. Arnold III. The Brigade experienced two casualties over the course of the deployment. Spc. Tony Carrasco Jr. Died on 4 November 2009. 2nd Battalion 32nd Field Artillery. Spc. Jacob Dohrenwend. 21 June 2010. 1st Battalion 28th Infantry Regiment.

==== Iraq 2010–2011 ====
1st Heavy Brigade Combat Team headquarters with their Brigade Support Battalion (BSB) and Special Troops Battalion deployed to Kirkuk, Iraq in October 2010 to establish the 1-1 Advise and Assist Task Force as part of Operation New Dawn. They were later joined by 1–5 Field Artillery in northern Iraq in late spring 2011.

2nd Heavy Brigade Combat Team deployed to Baghdad, Iraq in November 2010 in an advise and assist role as part of Operation New Dawn under the command of COL Paul T. Calvert. The brigade HQ was located at Victory Base Complex, where it was co-located within the USD-C Division HQ building and shared the same TOC. This unique C2 relationship earned the brigade the moniker of the "Luckiest Brigade in the Army" from the USD-C commander. The brigade was placed under USD-C (initially 1st AD, then 25th Infantry Division after Dec 2011) and was single-handedly responsible for the entire province of Baghdad. As the brigade responsible for the "center of gravity" (i.e. Baghdad) for United States Forces-Iraq, the 2nd "Dagger" Brigade was responsible for advising and assisting 50% of the Iraqi security forces within Iraq including two Iraqi corps HQ (the Karkh Area Command and Rusafa Area Command) and seven Iraqi divisions (6th IA, 9th IA – Mechanized, 17th IA, 11th IA, 1st FP, 2nd FP, and 4th FP) and 50,000 Iraqi policemen.

The 1st Battalion, 18th Infantry Regiment, commanded by LTC John Cross, was located at Camp Taji and FOB Old MOD. They were partnered with the 9th and 11th IA Divisions. 1st Battalion, 7th FA, commanded by LTC Andrew Gainey, was located at JSS Loyalty. They were partnered with the 1st Federal Police Division. 1st Battalion, 63rd Armored, commanded by LTC Michael Henderson, was located at JSS Deason, Muthana Airfield, and VBC. They were partnered with the 6th and 17th IA Divisions. 5th Squadron, 4th Cavalry, commanded by LTC Mathew Moore was located at JSS Falcon. They were partnered with the 2nd and 4th FP Divisions. The Special Troops Battalion, commanded by LTC Shilisa Geter, was located at VBC (Victory Base Complex) and partnered with the Baghdad Police Directorate. Meanwhile, due to the drawdown of US forces and the redeployment of theater-level sustainment brigades, the 299th BSB, commanded by LTC Dale Farrand, assumed the area support mission for all DOD and DOS elements within the province of Baghdad in addition to supporting the Dagger Brigade.

Significant events during this deployment included the resumption of attacks by the Sadrist movement and other Iranian-backed militia, the subsequent operations that stopped those attacks, the rearward passage of lines of USD-North as they redeployed through Baghdad, the organization and training of divisional field artillery regiments for the IA divisions, the fielding of M1 tanks for the 9th IA Division, and the hand-over of all US facilities within Baghdad to the Government of Iraq or elements of the US State Department. During this deployment the brigade simultaneously trained ISF units to the point of conducting Iraqi-led battalion CALFEXs, advised ISF units as they conducted hundreds of Iraqi-led raids which disrupted the attacks of Iranian-backed militia, while also conducting unilateral and combined force protection operations to ensure the security of US bases and redeploying US forces. The brigade experienced nine KIAs during this deployment, the majority of which resulted from a single IRAM attack (improvised rocket-assisted munition) conducted against JSS Loyalty by Iranian-backed militia on 6 June 2011. The brigade departed Iraq in November 2011 after having turned the majority of the city of Baghdad over to complete Iraqi control.

==== Afghanistan 2011–2012 ====
From 1st Heavy Brigade Combat Team, 1st Battalion, 16th Infantry (CAB) and 4th Squadron, 4th Cavalry deployed to Afghanistan in the winter of 2011, with 2nd Battalion, 34th Armor (CAB) later deploying in the spring of 2011. 1–16 IN (CAB) was assigned to support the combined joint special task force, the Iron Rangers were deployed to 58 remote locations across Afghanistan. They completed more than 10,000 missions as part of village stability operations with the Afghan people. The operations connected the government of Afghanistan to the village level and taught Afghans about their constitution. 2–34 AR (CAB) was deployed to Maiwand, Kandahar Province located southern Afghanistan near the Kandahar/Helmand Province border. 4-4 Cavalry was deployed to central Zhari District, Kandahar province and conducted thousands of combat patrols throughout the birthplace and homeland of the Taliban.

3rd Infantry Brigade Combat Team deployed to Khost and Paktya provinces in Eastern Afghanistan in January 2011. 2nd Battalion, 2nd Infantry Regiment was once again detached from the brigade and deployed to Ghazni province under Polish command. The brigade conducted Operations Tofan I and II. Tofan I's mission was to disrupt insurgent safe havens in the Musa Khel region of Khowst Province, improve the ability for the government to reach the people there and gather intelligence for planning future operations. Tofan II's mission was to establish contact with the insurgents, disrupt their logistics, and reduce any material or moral support from the local population. The movement to the extremely remote area, which featured narrow or non-existent roads set among mountains, included mounted and dismounted soldiers who also had to be aware of the need to control the key terrain features around Suri Kheyl.

==== Afghanistan 2012–2013 ====
The 1st Infantry Division headquarters deployed to Bagram, Afghanistan on 19 April 2012 as part of Operation Enduring Freedom XIII after receiving responsibility for Regional Command (East)(RC(E)) from 1st Cavalry Division. The division served as the Combined Joint Task Force-1 (CJTF-1) and RC(E), command and controlling the vital region (Bamiyan, Parwan, Panjshayr, Kapisa, Laghman, Nuristan, Konar, Nangarhar, Maiden Wardak, Logar, Paktiya, Khowst, Ghazni, and Paktika) surrounding Kabul and a large portion of the volatile border with Pakistan. During the division's tenure in Afghanistan, the division oversaw a transition of authority to the Afghan National Security Forces (ANSF)201st Corps north of Kabul and had prepared the ANSF 203rd Corps to assume full security responsibility south of Kabul prior to transitioning RC(E) to 101st Airborne Division (AASLT).

The 4th IBCT deployed to Afghanistan in May 2012 for a 9-month deployment. The brigade operated in Ghazni and Paktika provinces in eastern Afghanistan. Dragon Brigade concluded its deployment in February 2013, transitioning oversight of Ghazni province to 1st Brigade, 10th Mountain Division and Paktika province to 2nd Brigade, 10th Mountain Division and full security responsibility for those provinces to 3rd and 2nd Brigades, ANSF 203rd Corps, respectively.

==== Operation Inherent Resolve ====
In response to the growing ISIL threat, in June 2014 1ABCT, 1ID was sent to secure US State Department loacations in Baghdad, making it the first combat brigade back in Iraq since the ending of the Iraq war. The Department of Defense announced on 25 September 2014 that approximately 500 soldiers from the 1st Infantry Division Headquarters will be deployed to Iraq with the task of assisting Iraqi Security Forces. This will be the first Division HQ deployed in Iraq since withdrawal back in 2011. Among the soldiers sent over approximately 200 will be stationed in Baghdad, where they will make up close to half of US troops deployed.

In mid-October 2016 the US Army announced it will deploy about 500 soldiers from the 1st Infantry Division Headquarters to Iraq in the fall of 2016. Troops will assume the role of Combined Joint Forces Land Component Command-Iraq in support of Operation Inherent Resolve.

==== Operation Freedom's Sentinel ====
In late July 2016, the U.S. Army announced that it will send 800 soldiers from 1st Combat Aviation Brigade, 1st Infantry Division, to Afghanistan to support Operation Freedom's Sentinel – the U.S. counter-terrorism operation against the remnants of al-Qaeda, ISIS–K and other terror groups. The brigade will deploy with its AH-64 Apache attack helicopters and UH-60 Black Hawk utility helicopters sometime before October 2016.

==== Operation Atlantic Resolve ====
In April 2017, Military.com reported that approximately 4,000 soldiers from the 2nd Armored Brigade Combat Team, 1st Infantry Division will deploy to Europe as part of Operation Atlantic Resolve, replacing the 3rd Armored BCT, 4th Infantry Division in a regular rotation of forces. The unit deployed in September 2017 and redeployed in June 2018, serving throughout Eastern Europe conducting readiness and inter-operability training with NATO Allies to assure U.S. Allies and deter aggression. Part of the Division Headquarters deployed in March 2018 to Poznań, Poland, to command the Regionally Aligned Forces serving in Atlantic Resolve. They were scheduled to remain until June 2020. In January the division's 1st Armored Brigade Combat Team and 1st Combat Aviation Brigade deployed to Eastern Europe in Support of Operation Atlantic Resolve with the mission of building readiness, assuring Allies, and deterring aggression on the continent. The 1st Armored Brigade Combat Team deployed again to Operation Atlantic Resolve in July 2021. The Brigade's deployment was extended indefinitely in response to the Russian invasion of Ukraine in February 2022.

== Division organization ==
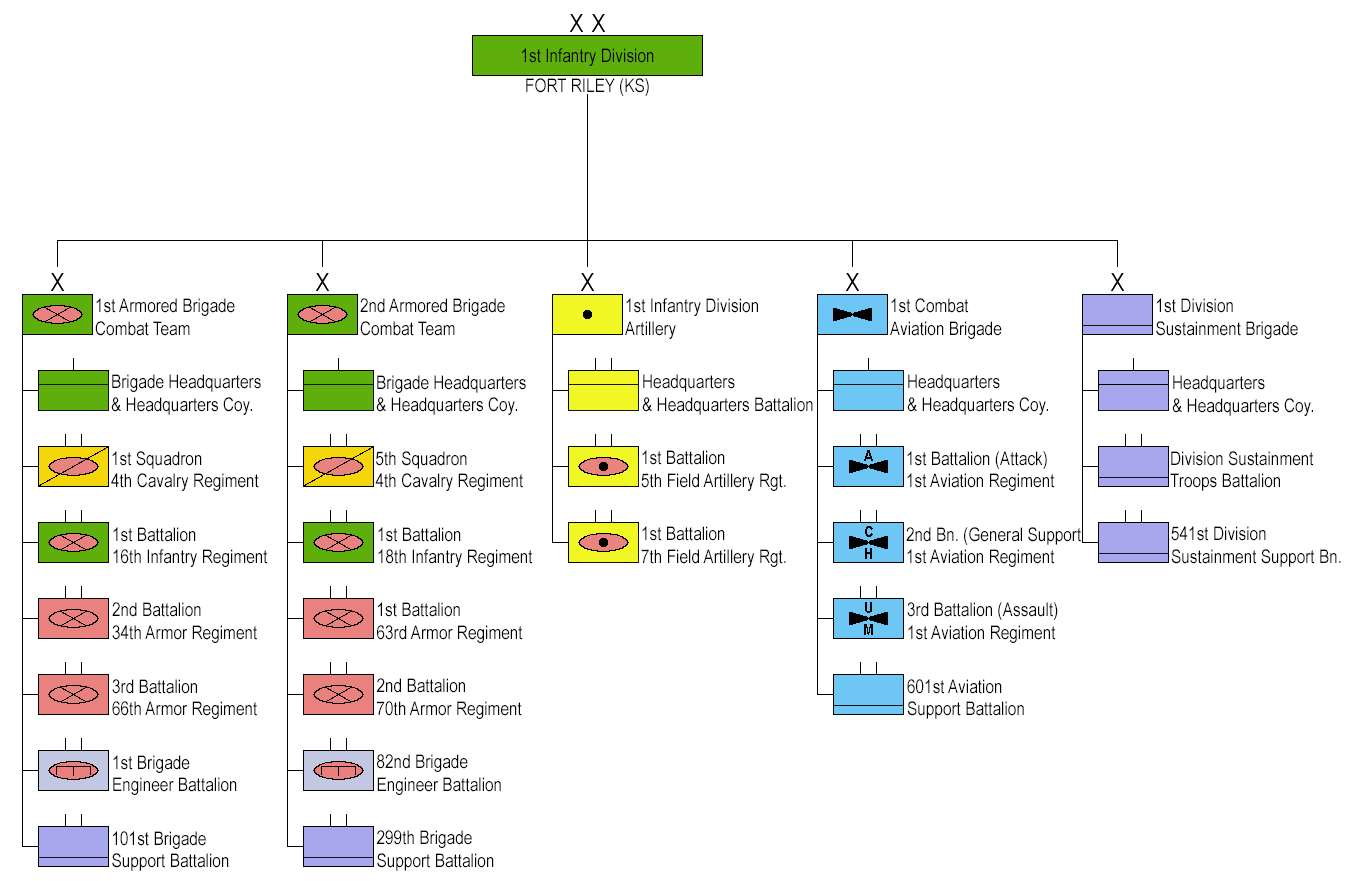
1st Infantry Division organization October 2026

1st Infantry Division consists of the following elements: a division headquarters and headquarters battalion, two armored brigade combat teams, a division artillery, a combat aviation brigade, and a division sustainment brigade.

- 1st Infantry Division
  - 5th Engineer Battalion, at Fort Leonard Wood (MO)
  - 1st Armored Brigade Combat Team (1st ABCT) ("Devil Brigade")
    - Headquarters and Headquarters Company (HHC), 1st ABCT
    - 1st Squadron, 4th Cavalry Regiment "Quarter-horse"
    - 1st Battalion, 16th Infantry Regiment "Iron Rangers"
    - 2nd Battalion, 34th Armor Regiment "Dreadnaughts"
    - 3rd Battalion, 66th Armor Regiment "Burt's Knights"
    - 1st Brigade Engineer Battalion (BEB) "Diehards"
    - 101st Brigade Support Battalion (BSB) "Liberty"
  - 2nd Armored Brigade Combat Team (2nd ABCT) "Dagger Brigade"
    - Headquarters and Headquarters Company (HHC), 2nd ABCT
    - 5th Squadron, 4th Cavalry Regiment "Longknife"
    - 1st Battalion, 18th Infantry Regiment "Vanguards"
    - 1st Battalion, 63rd Armor Regiment "Dragons"
    - 2nd Battalion, 70th Armor Regiment "Thunder Bolts"
    - 82nd Brigade Engineer Battalion (BEB) "Bluebabe"
    - 299th Brigade Support Battalion (BSB) "Lifeline"
  - 1st Infantry Division Artillery
    - Headquarters and Headquarters Battalion (former Division Headquarters and Headquarters Battalion)
    - 1st Battalion, 5th Field Artillery Regiment (FAR) "Hamilton's Own"
    - 1st Battalion, 7th Field Artillery Regiment "First Lightning"
  - 1st Combat Aviation Brigade ("Demon Brigade")
    - Headquarters and Headquarters Company (HHC)
    - 1st Battalion (Attack), 1st Aviation Regiment with 24 AH-64D Apache Longbows
    - 2nd Battalion (General Support), 1st Aviation Regiment with 8 UH-60L Black Hawks, 12 CH-47F Chinooks and 15 HH-60M Black Hawks
    - 3rd Battalion (Assault), 1st Aviation Regiment with 30 UH-60M Black Hawks
    - 601st Aviation Support Battalion
  - 1st Division Sustainment Brigade
    - Division Sustainment Troops Battalion
      - HHC
      - 267th Signal Company
    - 541st Division Sustainment Support Battalion
      - HHC
      - 1st Maintenance Company (Support)
      - 24th Transportation Company (Composite Truck)
      - 165th Movement Control Team (MCT)
      - 266th Movement Control Team (MCT)
      - 526th Quartermaster Company (Composite Supply)

== Honors ==
=== Campaigns ===
Conflict	Streamer	Year(s)
World War I	Montdidier-Noyon	1918
World War I	Aisne-Marne	1918
World War I	St. Mihiel	1918
World War I	Meuse-Argonne	1918
World War I	Lorraine 1917	1917
World War I	Lorraine 1918	1918
World War I	Picardy 1918	1918
World War II	Algeria-French Morocco (with arrowhead)	1942
World War II	Tunisia	1942
World War II	Sicily (with arrowhead)	1943
World War II	Normandy (with arrowhead)	1944
World War II	Northern France	1944
World War II	Rhineland	1945
World War II	Ardennes-Alsace	1944–1945
World War II	Central Europe	1945
Vietnam War	Defense	1965
Vietnam War	Counteroffensive	1965–1966
Vietnam War	Counteroffensive, Phase II	1966–1967
Vietnam War	Counteroffensive, Phase III	1967–1968
Vietnam War	Tet Counteroffensive	1968
Vietnam War	Counteroffensive, Phase IV	1968
Vietnam War	Counteroffensive, Phase V	1968
Vietnam War	Counteroffensive, Phase VI	1968–1969
Vietnam War	Tet 69/Counteroffensive	1969
Vietnam War	Summer-Fall 1969	1969
Vietnam War	Winter-Spring 1970	1969–1970
Gulf War	Defense of Saudi Arabia	1990–1991
Gulf War	Liberation and Defense of Kuwait	1991
Gulf War	Ceasefire	1991
Global War On Terrorism	Global War on Terrorism	2001–present
Operation Iraqi Freedom	Iraqi Governance	2004
Operation Iraqi Freedom	National Resolution	2005
Operation Iraqi Freedom	Iraqi Surge	2007
Operation Iraqi Freedom	Iraqi Sovereignty	2009
Operation Iraqi Freedom	New Dawn	2010
Operation Enduring Freedom	Transition I	2011–2012

=== Medal of Honor recipients ===
- WORLD WAR I:
1. SGT Michael B. Ellis
2. PVT Sterling L. Morelock
3. PFC Daniel R. Edwards
4. 2LT Samuel I. Parker
5. SGT Wilbur E. Colyer
- WORLD WAR II:
1. PVT Robert T. Henry
2. 1LT Jimmie W. Monteith
3. SGT Max Thompson
4. PFC Gino J. Merli
5. PVT James W. Reese
6. SSG Joseph E. Schaefer
7. PFC Francis X. McGraw
8. CPT Bobbie E. Brown
9. CPL Henry F. Warner
10. 2LT Walter D. Ehlers
11. T/5 John J. Pinder Jr.
12. PVT Carlton W. Barrett
13. SGT Alfred B. Nietzel
14. 1LT Walter J. Will
15. SSG Arthur F. DeFranzo
16. T/Sgt. Jake W. Lindsey
17. SSG George Peterson
- VIETNAM WAR:
1. 2LT Robert John Hibbs
2. SSG James Leroy Bondsteel
3. SPC Robert D. Law
4. SFC Matthew Leonard
5. 1LT Gary L. Miller
6. SGT Donald Russell Long
7. 2LT Harold Bascom Durham Jr.
8. CPT Eurípides Rubio
9. SGT Candelario Garcia
10. LTC Charles Calvin Rogers
11. SGT James W. Robinson Jr.
12. SPC Robert F. Stryker
13. 1LT Larry L. Taylor
- IRAQ WAR:
1. PFC Ross A. McGinnis
2. SSG David Bellavia

=== Decorations ===
Ribbon	Award	Year	Notes
	Meritorious Unit Commendation (Army)	1968	VIETNAM
	Meritorious Unit Commendation (Army)	1990–1991	SOUTHWEST ASIA
	Army Superior Unit Award (Army)	1997	BOSNIA
	French Croix de Guerre, with Palm	1945	KASSERINE
	French Croix de Guerre, with Palm	1945	NORMANDY
	French Croix de guerre, World War II, Fourragere	1945	Fourragère
	Belgian Fourragere	1940	Fourragère
	Cited in the Order of the Day of the Belgian Army	1945	For action at MONS
	Cited in the Order of the Day of the Belgian Army	1945	For action at EUPEN-MALMEDY
	Republic of Vietnam Cross of Gallantry, with Palm	1965–1968	For service in Vietnam
	Republic of Vietnam Civil Action Unit Citation	1965–1970	For service in Vietnam

== Insignia ==
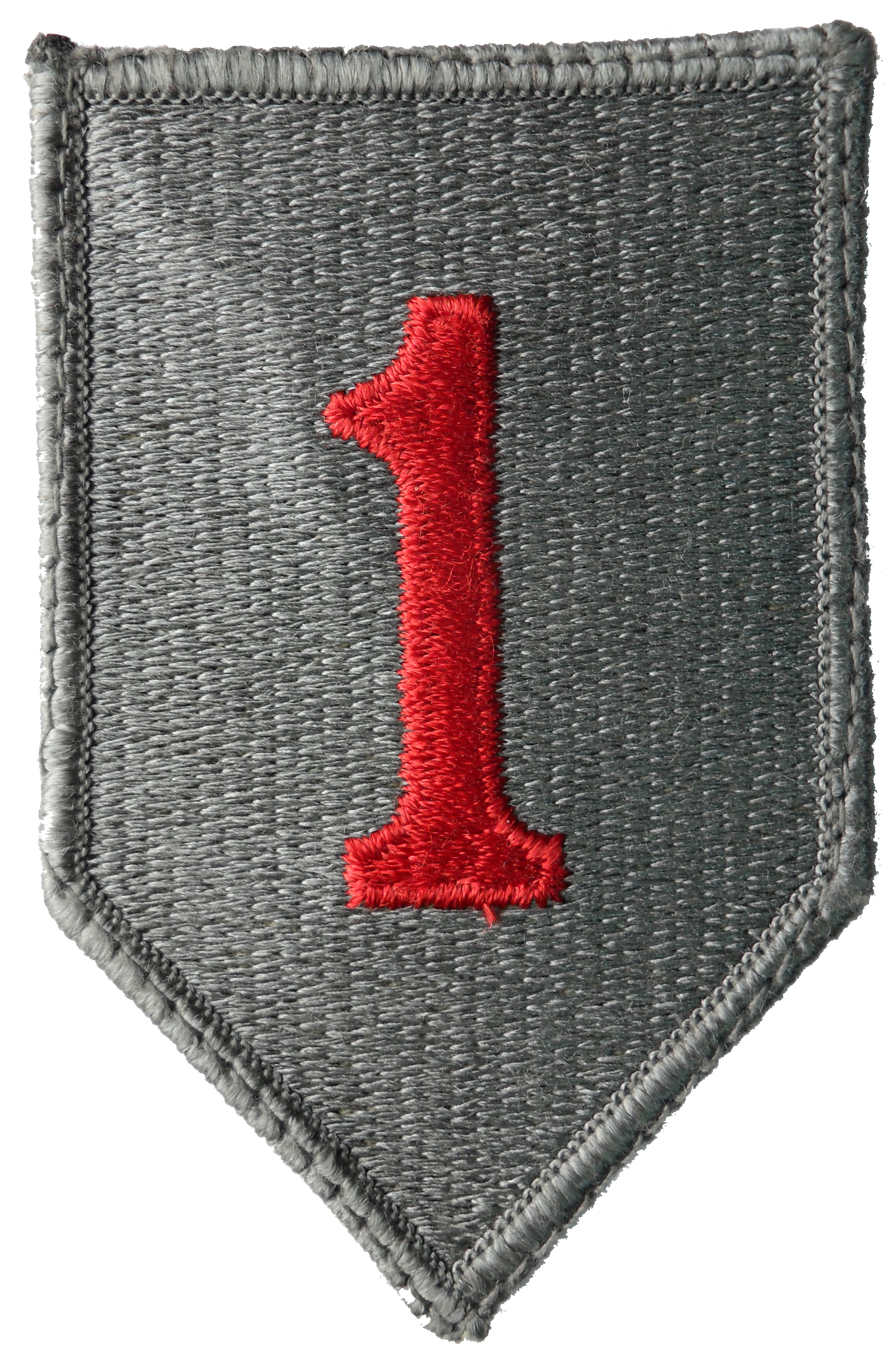
The shoulder sleeve insignia (SSI) worn on a unit member's UCP Army Combat Uniform

No credible source states how the insignia of the 1st Infantry Division originated in World War I. There are two theories as to how the idea of the patch came about. The first theory states that the 1st Division supply trucks were manufactured in England. To make sure the 1st Division's trucks were not confused with other allies, the drivers would paint a huge "1" on the side of each truck. Later, the division engineers would go even further and put a red number one on their sleeves.

The second theory claims that a general of the division decided the unit should have a shoulder insignia. He decided to cut a red numeral "1" from his flannel underwear. When he showed his prototype to his men, one lieutenant said, "the general's underwear is showing!" Offended, the general challenged the young lieutenant to come up with something better. So, the young officer cut a piece of gray cloth from the uniform of a captured soldier and placed the red "1" on top.

== Music ==
=== Band ===
The 1st Infantry Division Band (abbreviated as the 1ID Band and often known as the Big Red One Band) is the musical ambassador for the division that performs for military ceremonies at Fort Riley and the surrounding communities in the Midwest. The 38-member band contains the Concert Wind Ensemble, the Marching Band, a Seated Ceremonial Band as well as other specialized ensembles. The band was notably involved in the Thunder Road incident in Vietnam, during which Major General John Hay ordered the band to march down "Thunder Road", for one mile while playing the Colonel Bogey March. The road, which was critical to the division's operations, was under the control of a North Vietnamese Army regiment. Confused by the action, the regiment withdrew from the area, with the band fulfilling a remarkable combat mission without firing a shot. In 2008, a parachutist injured three members of the band after crashing into them following getting off course during military review.

=== Song ===
Toast of the Army,
Favorite Son! Hail to the brave Big Red One!
Always the first to thirst for a fight.
No foe shall challenge our right to victory.
We take the field, A grand sight to see.
Pride of the Infantry.
Soldiers of a great division,
Courage is our tradition,
Forward the Big Red One!

According to the 1st Infantry Division history, the song was composed in 1943 by Captain Donald T. Kellett, who retired after a 30-year career as a colonel and died in 1991. Later revised from "Men of a great division" to "Soldiers of a great division".

== See also ==
- The Big Red One (1980), a movie about the division's experiences in World War II written by Samuel Fuller, who served in the division during World War II.
- Cantigny Park, the former estate of Col. Robert R. McCormick, is where the 1st Infantry Division Museum at Cantigny is located. The museum showcases the history of the 1st Infantry Division, from its involvement in World War I to the present, along with several tanks situated outside the museum dating from World War I to the present.
- Iraq Assistance Group, a former joint command coordinating the coalition military transition team mission in Iraq which was formed from the 1st Infantry Division.
- Call of Duty 2: Big Red One, an expansion for the first-person shooter video game Call of Duty 2 with a focus on the division's operations in World War II.
- Call of Duty: WWII has players take on the role of Ronald "Red" Daniels, a private and part of "The Bloody First", following the operations of the division from the D-Day landings, up to the capture of the Rhineland.

== Explanatory notes ==
Preceded by 34th Division	Multinational Division South; 2010–2011	Succeeded by none
Preceded by 1st Cavalry Division	Regional Command East; 2012–2013	Succeeded by 101st Airborne Division
