= Saddam Line =

Fortification line during the Gulf War

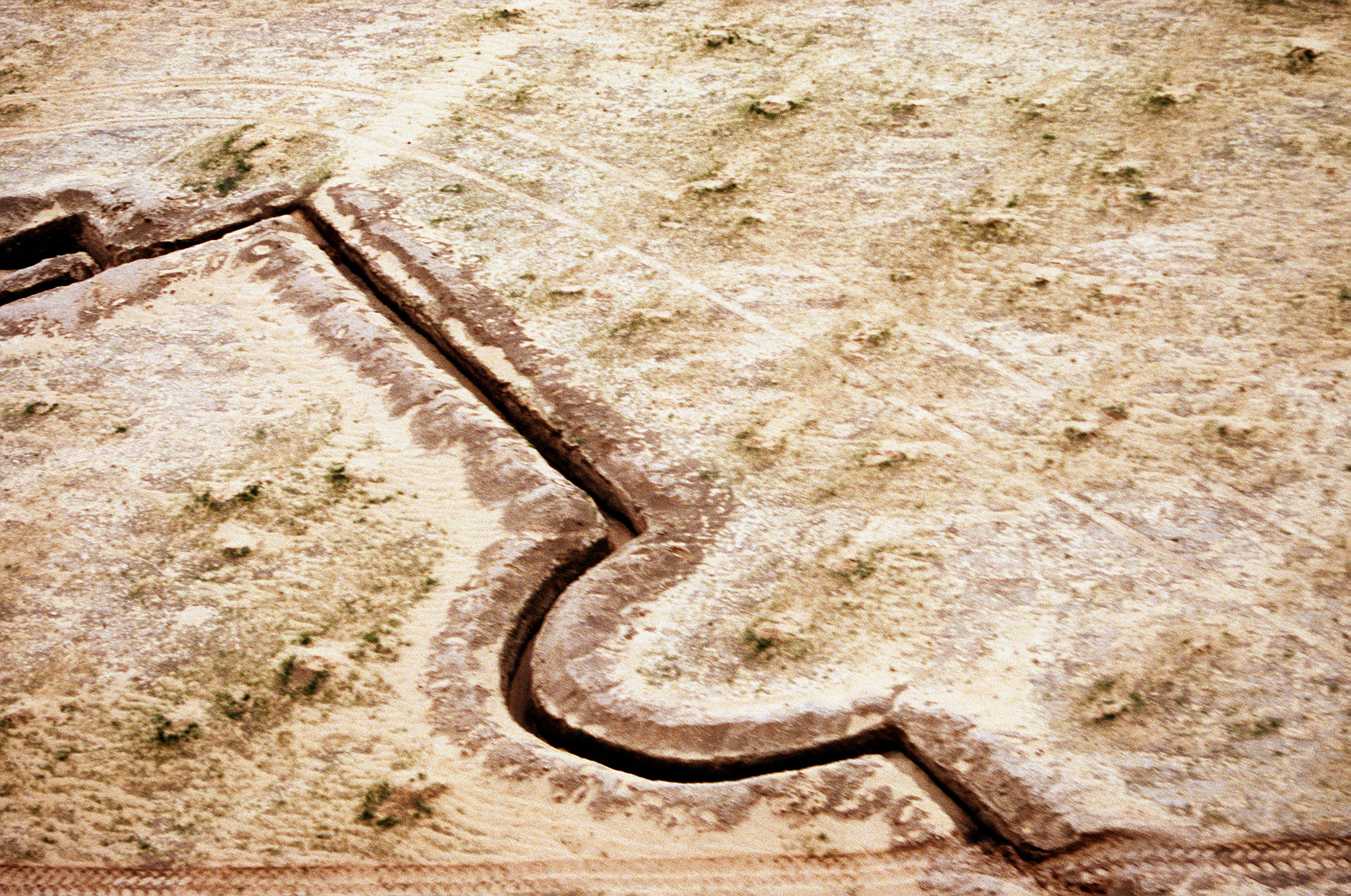
Iraqi trench line abandoned during Operation Desert Storm

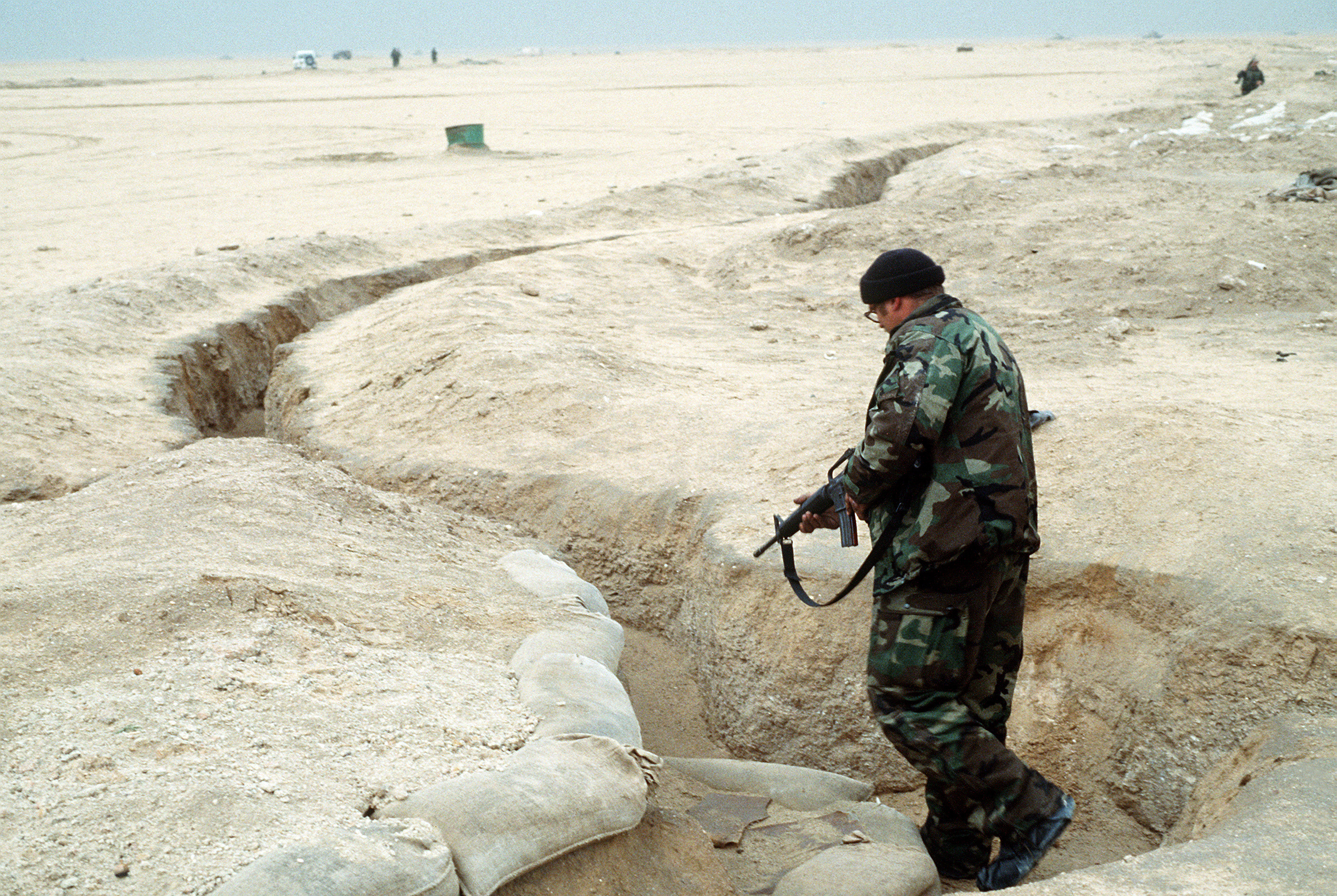
A Coalition soldier inspecting an Iraqi trench

The Saddam Line consisted of a series of defensive fortifications constructed by Saddam Hussein's Iraqi Army on Kuwait's border with Saudi Arabia after Iraq had invaded and occupied Kuwait in August 1990. The plan was to force any attacker into a trench war of attrition. However, due to the attacking Coalition forces using tanks with minesweeper ploughs in the Gulf War, the Saddam Line was rendered largely ineffectual.

== History ==
The design of the Saddam Line was based upon the Iraqi Army's use of Soviet Union-style defensive tactics. The Western media presented fears that it would present a formidable obstacle to the liberation of Kuwait, consisting of "flame trenches" (ditches filled with oil to be ignited in case of attack) and "sand berms, trench works, anti-tank ditches, barbed wire and minefields", backed by the threat of chemical and biological weapons. The objective of Hussein was to force the coalition to engage in costly trench warfare. The rationale was that the Coalition forces would have to clear each trench one at a time, as happened during the First World War. However, the American 1st Infantry Division opted to use minesweeping ploughs on the front of their tanks to demolish the trenches as they advanced.

However, those fears turned out to be unwarranted. The Coalition assault, beginning at 4 a.m. on February 24, 1991, met "only sporadic resistance", and by 6:45 a.m., troops had broken through the Saddam Line. The US forces charged the Iraqi lines with M1 Abrams tanks modified with minesweeping plows and M728 Combat Engineer Vehicles which buried the trenchlines, and in many cases, buried Iraqi troops alive, the number of which has been estimated to be "in the thousands", though the Iraqi government stated after the war that they had found 44 bodies. The Coalition forces did not lose a man whilst breaching the Saddam Line.

== See also ==
- Maginot Line
- Mannerheim Line
- Trench warfare
