= Mnichov (Domažlice District) =

- Municipality
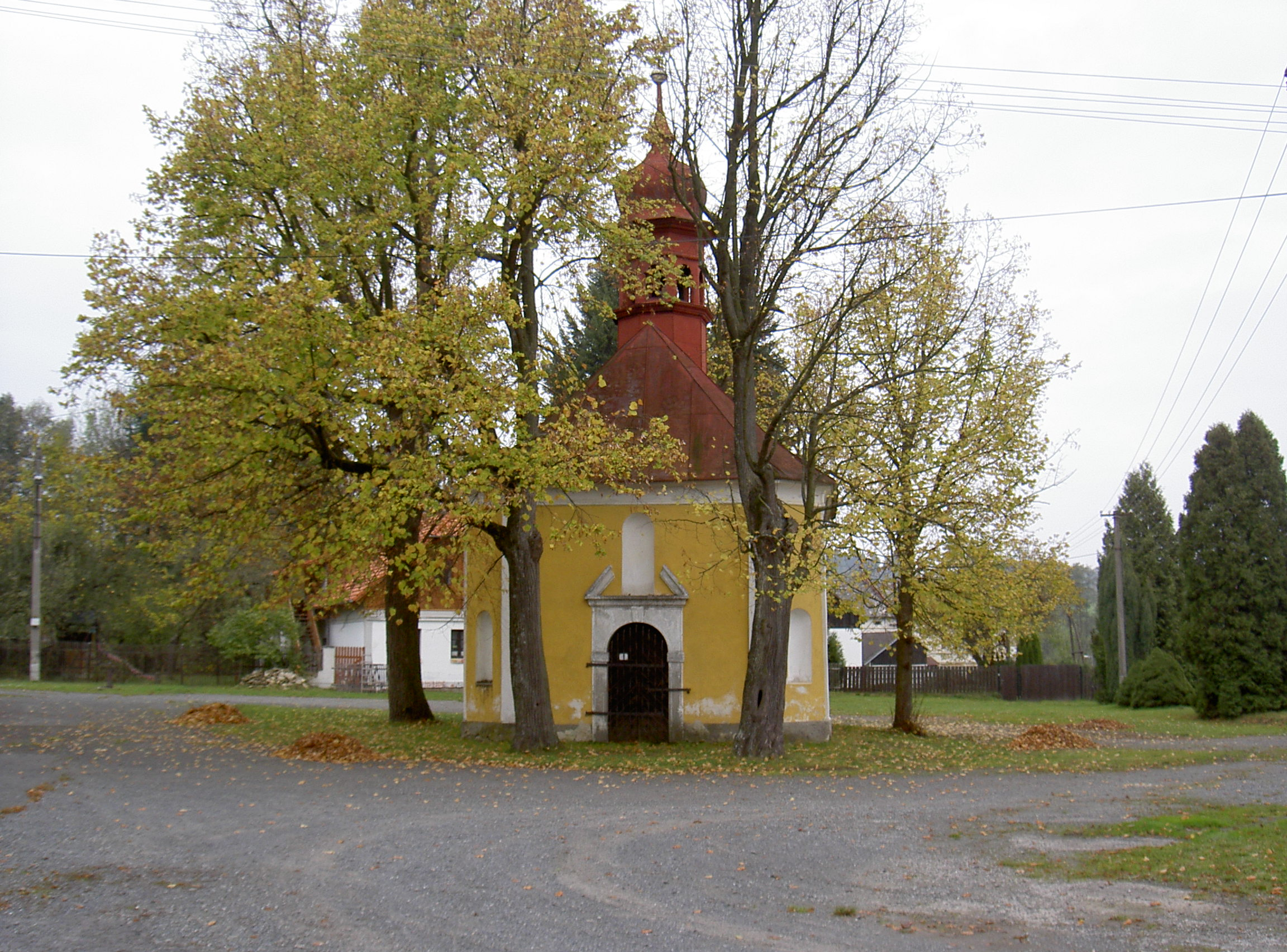
- Chapel of the Holy Trinity

- Location in the Czech Republic
- Coordinates: 49°29′49″N 12°45′52″E
- Country: Czech Republic
- Region: Plzeň
- District: Domažlice
- First mentioned: 1550

Area
  - Total: 14.25 km^{2} (5.50 sq mi)
- Elevation: 472 m (1,549 ft)

Population (2026-01-01)
  - Total: 216
  - Density: 15.2/km^{2} (39.3/sq mi)
- Time zone: UTC+1 (CET)
  - Summer (DST): UTC+2 (CEST)
- Postal code: 345 22
- Website: obec-mnichov.cz

Mnichov is a municipality and village in Domažlice District in the Plzeň Region of the Czech Republic. It has about 200 inhabitants.

Mnichov lies approximately 14 kilometres (9 mi) north-west of Domažlice, 53 km (33 mi) south-west of Plzeň, and 137 km (85 mi) south-west of Prague.

== Administrative division ==
Mnichov consists of three municipal parts (in brackets population according to the 2021 census):

- Mnichov (143)
- Pivoň (47)
- Vranov (25)

== Demographics ==
Historical population
Year	Pop.	±%
1869	1,125	—
1880	1,123	−0.2%
1890	1,096	−2.4%
1900	1,090	−0.5%
1910	1,148	+5.3%
1921	1,152	+0.3%
1930	1,019	−11.5%
1950	422	−58.6%
1961	320	−24.2%
1970	330	+3.1%
1980	296	−10.3%
1991	270	−8.8%
2001	243	−10.0%
2011	232	−4.5%
2021	215	−7.3%
Source: Censuses
