= Task Force Falcon (United States) =

Task Force Falcon has been the name of several United States Army Task forces.

== Kosovo ==
Task Force Falcon, a brigade-sized task force, was created on 9 June 1999 under the command of Brigadier General Bantz John Craddock using selected elements of Task Force Hawk, sent to Albania to provide support for Operation Allied Force during the Kosovo War. These units were deployed to Camp Able Sentry in Macedonia on that day, and were sent into Kosovo under Operation Joint Guardian, the NATO peacekeeping force in Kosovo, on 11 June. However, planning for the TF had started months before its creation, in the winter of 1998–1999. It was named Task Force Falcon to complement Task Force Eagle, the name for the NATO peacekeeping force in Bosnia, and initially included around 3,500 United States troops. It doubled in size by early spring 1999 after engineers were added for support, and the 2nd Brigade, 1st Infantry Division was alerted for deployment in early June. By 8 June, its United States Army Europe organization was finalized, including the 1st Battalion, 26th Infantry Regiment, 3rd Infantry Division, 1st Battalion, 77th Armor, 9th Engineer Battalion, 1st Battalion, 7th Field Artillery, the 299th Forward Support Battalion, the 2nd Brigade Reconnaissance Troop (E Troop, 4th Cavalry Regiment), and the headquarters for the 2nd Brigade and a tactical command post for support units from the 1st Infantry Division.

== Afghanistan ==
=== Combat Aviation Brigade, 10th Mountain Division ===
The Aviation Brigade, 10th Mountain Division (redesignated Combat Aviation Brigade on 19 Sep 2005) was given the epithet ″The Falcon Brigade″ upon its reactivation at Griffiss Air Force Base in Rome, New York, as part of the 10th Mountain Division on 2 July 1988. The aviation brigade continues to be known by its epithet, with the exception of being organized as ″Task Force Falcon″ during the Global War on Terrorism.

In July 2003, the Aviation Brigade headquarters deployed to Bagram Airfield and 2d Battalion, 10th Aviation deployed to Kandahar Airfield in support of Operation Enduring Freedom (OEF) IV. While deployed, the Aviation Brigade assumed command of Task Force Panther, Task Force Talon, and Task Force Red Dawg (USMC), and renamed the Brigade to Combined Joint Task Force (CJTF) Falcon.

In winter 2006 the Combat Aviation Brigade, 10th Mountain Division was deployed again to Afghanistan as the only aviation brigade in the theater, stationed at Bagram Air Base, Afghanistan. Named "Task Force Falcon," the brigade's mission was to conduct aviation operations to destroy insurgents and anti-coalition militia in an effort to help build the Afghan National Security Force's capability and allow the Afghan government to increase its capabilities. In addition, the Task Force provided logistical and aviation support for International Security Assistance Force forces throughout the country, conducted tactical maneuvers and performed security and attack operations when needed.

In early 2010 the aviation brigade again task organized as ″Task Force Falcon,″ with its subordinate battalion commands being organized into their respective task forces, in order to prepare for deployment to Afghanistan in support of OEF XI (October 2010 - October 2011). The brigade remained organized in task force structure for sometime upon its return to Wheeler-Sack Army Airfield, Fort Drum, New York.

=== Combat Aviation Brigade, 3rd Infantry Division ===
In October 2017, half of the Combat Aviation Brigade, 3rd Infantry Division deployed to Afghanistan as Task Force Falcon, replacing the 16th Combat Aviation Brigade of the 7th Infantry Division.
