= Wheeler-Sack Army Airfield =

Wheeler-Sack AAF
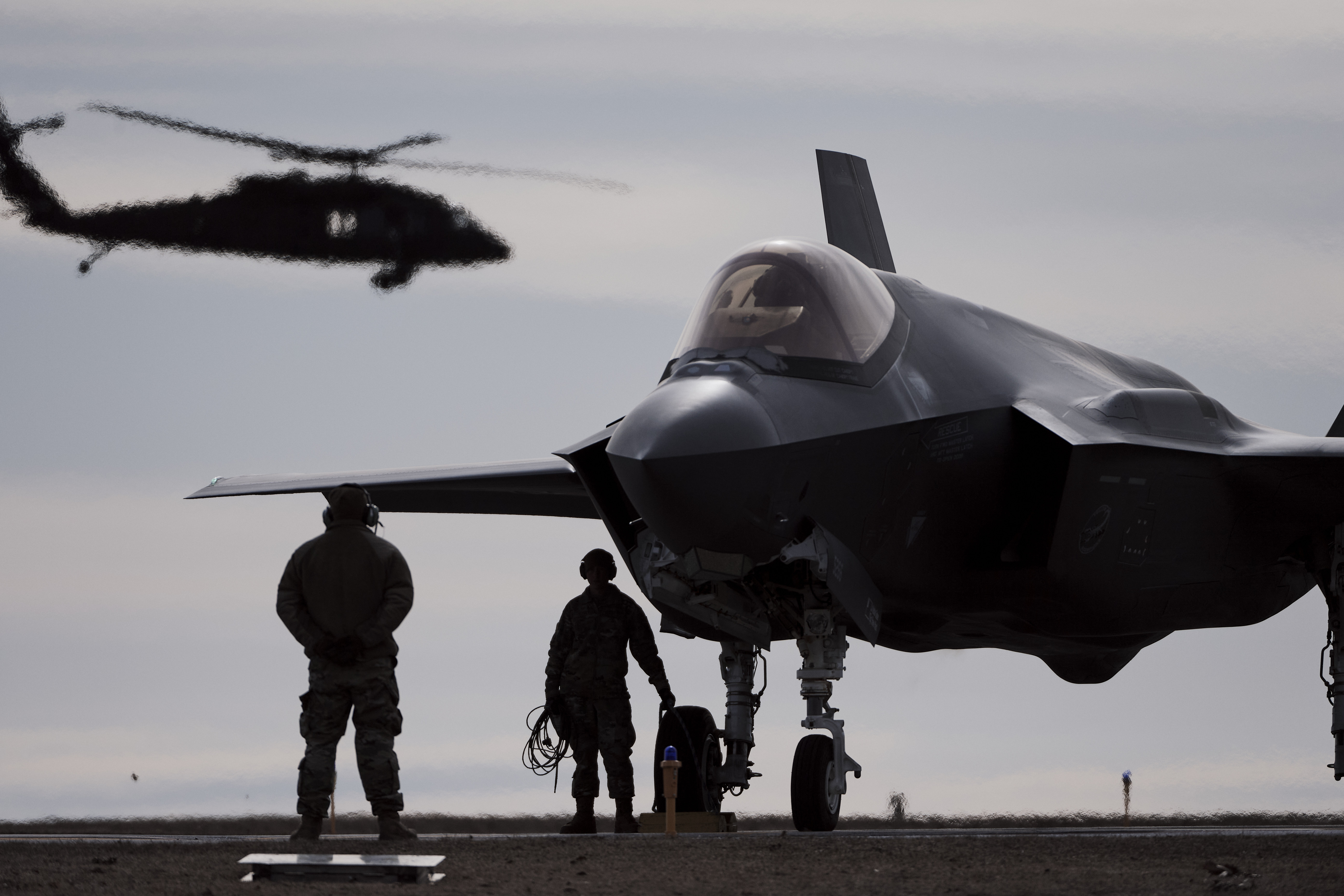
- IATA: none; ICAO: KGTB; FAA LID: GTB

Summary
- Airport type: Military
- Owner: U.S. Army ATCA-ASO
- Location: Fort Drum, New York
- Elevation AMSL: 690 ft / 210 m
- Coordinates: 44°03′20″N 075°43′10″W
- Interactive map of Wheeler-Sack AAF

Runways
Direction	Length		Surface
Direction	ft	m	Surface
3/21	10,000	3,048	Concrete
8/26	4,482	1,366	Concrete
15/33	4,999	1,524	Concrete
- Source: Federal Aviation Administration

Wheeler-Sack Army Airfield (ICAO: KGTB, FAA LID: GTB) is a military use airport located at Fort Drum, in Jefferson County, New York, United States. It is owned by the U.S. Army.

Although most U.S. airports use the same three-letter location identifier for the FAA and IATA, this airport is assigned GTB by the FAA but has no designation from the IATA (which assigned GTB to Genting Airport in Malaysia). However, as of November 2012, IATA (in its Location Identifier Notification #40 bulletin, 2012) claimed back the GTB code because Genting's airport could not be found.

== History ==
Although in use in the early years of army aviation supporting the "Pine Plains" military training ground, during World War II the airfield was extensively expanded for use by the United States Army Air Forces as home of the 91st Observation Squadron, USAAF. The 91st was attached to the Army's 4th Armored Division, training at the time for the division's later role exploiting Operation Cobra in Northern France. Additions to the field including two new 4500' x 150' concrete runways and a steel hangar.

Throughout World War II and the Korean War, Wheeler-Sack continued to support the needs of Fort Drum, which ebbed and flowed with the Army's training needs.

When Fort Drum was designated as the new home of the Army's newly reactivated 10th Mountain Division in 1985, the reactivation ceremony was held in the steel hangar at Wheeler-Sack. The division, a part of the Army's component of the United States Rapid Deployment Forces, was designed to be moved from the continental United States to distant theater on short notice. Initially, the components of the division that were air-transportable were moved via Griffiss Air Force Base.

But the logistics involved with moving personnel, equipment, and munitions across 85 miles of road made the arrangement less than optimal, and the Army chose to expand Wheeler-Sack. Completed in 1998, the expansion now allows Wheeler-Sack to accommodate any aircraft in the United States Air Force inventory, and with scales, an ammunition holding area, refueling points, and a vehicle staging and inspection area, the field can serve as the primary departure airfield for the 10th Mountain Division. The new pre-deployment processing facility at the airfield accommodates up to 1,200 soldiers, allowing entire battalions to stage directly to overseas destination from the field.

In recent years, the 10th Mountain Division's aerial reconnaissance abilities have been expanded with the addition of 3 RQ-7B Shadow TUAS platoons and a special-use 500 foot runway designed for unmanned aircraft operations at Wheeler-Sack.

== Facilities ==
Wheeler-Sack AAF has three runways with concrete surfaces: 3/21 is 10,000 by 150 feet (3,048 x 46 m), 8/26 is 4,482 by 150 feet (1,366 x 46 m), and 15/33 is 4,999 by 150 feet (1,524 x 46 m).

== Current Units ==
- 10th Mountain Division
  - Combat Aviation Brigade "Falcons"
    - HHC
    - 1st Battalion, 10th Aviation Regiment (Attack) "Tigershark"
    - 2nd Battalion, 10th Aviation Regiment (Assault)
    - 3rd Battalion, 10th Aviation Regiment (General Support) "Phoenix"
    - 6th Squadron, 6th Cavalry Regiment "Six Shooters"
    - 277th Aviation Support Battalion "Mountain Eagle"

== See also ==
- New York World War II Army Airfields
