= 2nd Brigade Combat Team, 1st Infantry Division =

One of two basic maneuver units of the 1st Infantry Division, US Army

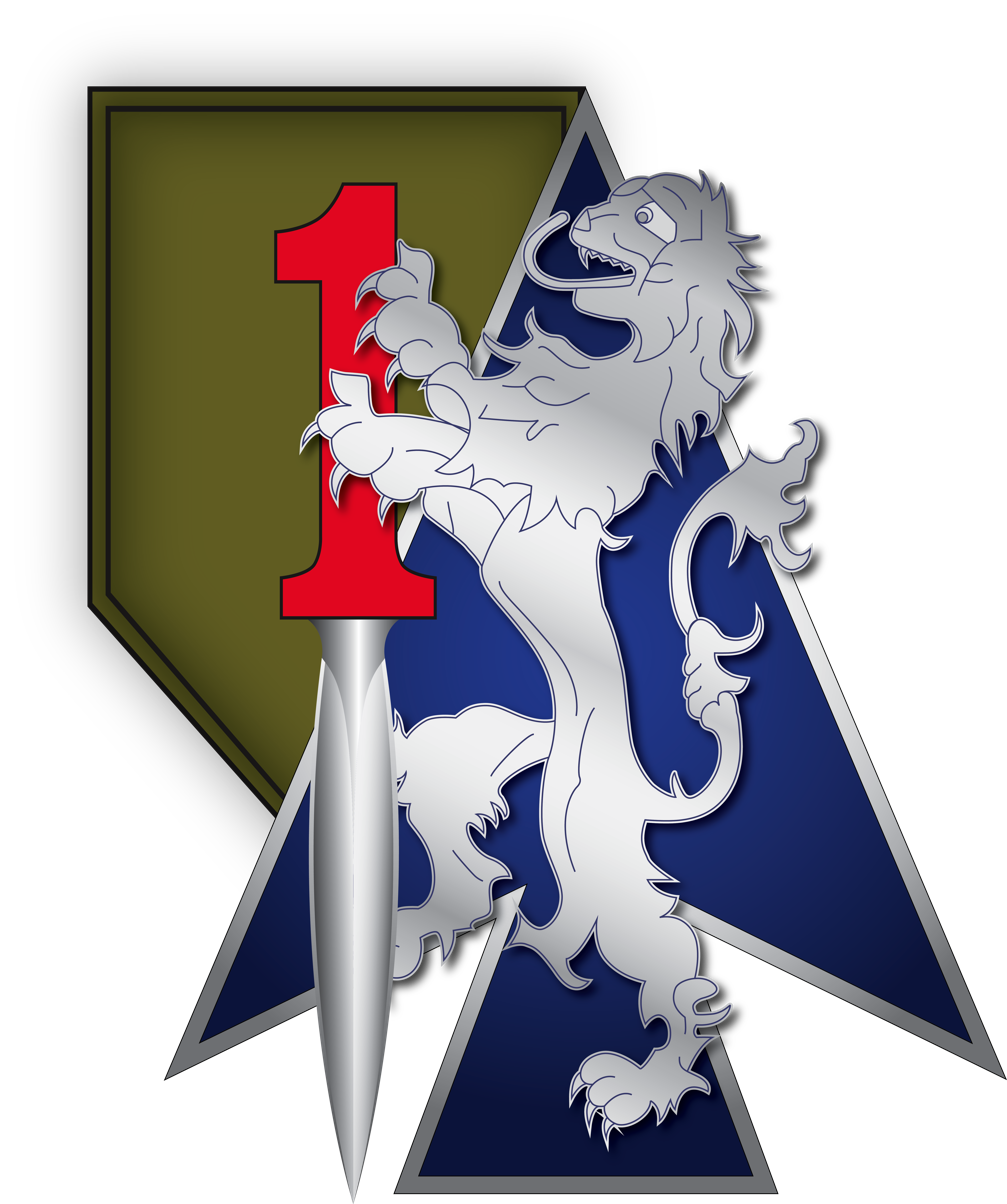
- 2nd ABCT, 1st ID Badge
- Active: 24 May 1917–
- Country: United States of America
- Branch: United States Army
- Type: Infantry
- Size: Brigade
- Part of: 1st Infantry Division
- Garrison/HQ: Fort Riley, Kansas
- Nickname: "Dagger Brigade"

The 2nd Brigade Combat Team, 1st Infantry Division, also known as the Dagger Brigade, is a maneuver brigade combat team in the 1st Infantry Division of the U.S. Army stationed in Fort Riley, Kansas.

== History ==
=== World War I ===
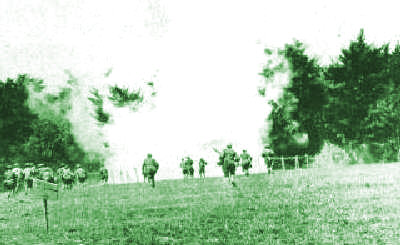
Soldiers from the 2nd Dagger Brigade in World War I.

The 2nd Brigade was first constituted on 24 May 1917 as Headquarters, 2nd Infantry Brigade of the 1st Expeditionary Division, which was later designated as the 1st Division.

- Headquarters, 2nd Infantry Brigade
  - 26th Infantry Regiment
  - 28th Infantry Regiment
  - 3rd Machine Gun Battalion

The 2nd Brigade deployed to France in December 1917 with the rest of the 1st Infantry Division as part of the American Expeditionary Force (AEF), as the American military was known in World War I. The brigade participated in many campaigns, including the Meuse-Argonne Offensive and the Battle of Saint-Mihiel.

The brigade redeployed at the end of World War I in August 1918.

==== Commanders 2nd Infantry Brigade ====
- 1917
1. 7 June COL Robert L. Bullard
2. 28 June BG Robert L. Bullard
3. 22 July Col. Charles A. Doyen, USMC (ad interim)
4. 9 August BG Robert L. Bullard
5. 14 August Col. Charles A. Doyen, USMC (ad interim)
6. 19 August BG Robert L. Bullard
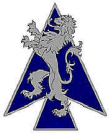
  Distinctive unit insignia of 2nd BCT.
7. 26 August Col. Charles A. Doyen, USMC (ad interim)
8. 29 August BG Robert L. Bullard
9. 4 September BG Beaumont B. Buck
10. 1 November COL Ferdinand W. Kobbe (ad interim)
11. 10 November BG Beaumont B. Buck
- 1918
1. 27 August BG Frank E. Bamford
2. 12 October COL George C. Barnhardt (ad interim)
3. 17 October BG George C. Barnhardt
4. 26 October BG Francis C. Marshall
- 1919
1. 2 February COL Fredrik L. Knudson (ad interim)
2. 17 February BG Francis C. Marshall
3. 29 May COL Robert A. Brown (ad interim)
4. 6 June BG Frank E. Bamford
5. 11 July COL Robert A. Brown (ad interim)
6. 16 July BG Frank E. Bamford
7. 24 July COL Robert A. Brown (ad interim)
8. 2 August COL Adolphe H. Huguet (ad interim)
9. 9 August to 4 September COL Robert A. Brown

=== World War II ===
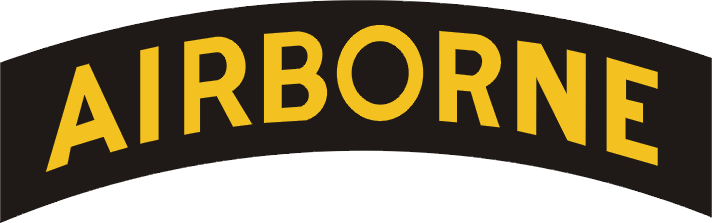
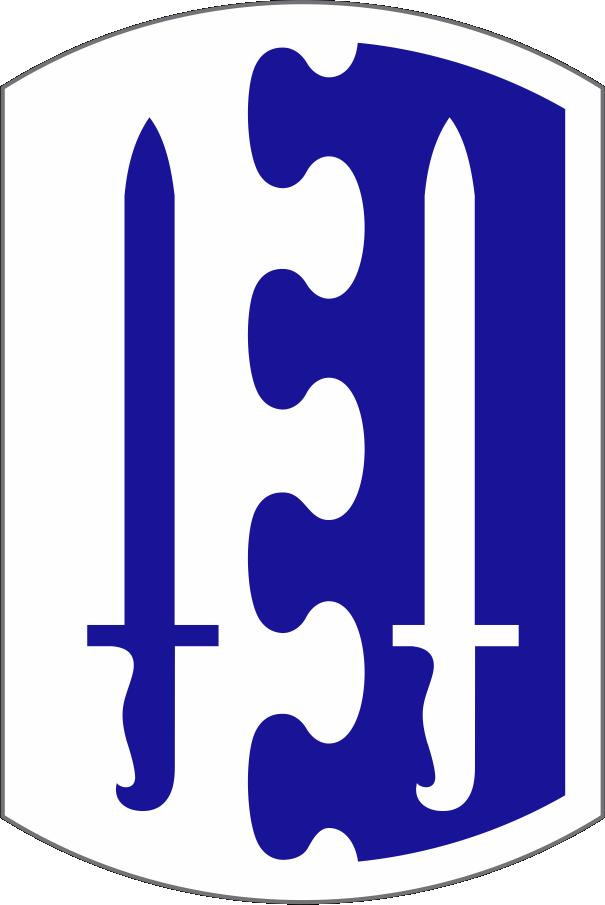
Shoulder sleeve insignia (SSI) of the 2nd Infantry Brigade. The SSI consisted of the traditional blue and white infantry colors with two bayonets reflecting the number of the brigade. During World War II the black and gold Airborne Tab was worn over the insignia.

At the start of World War II, the 2nd Brigade was stationed at Fort Ontario at Oswego, New York. When the United States Army reorganized from the square division to the triangular division, each division lost its brigade-based structure as well as one infantry regiment; in the case of the 1st Infantry Division, this was the 28th Infantry Regiment, which served as a separate regiment until its assignment to the 8th Infantry Division on 22 June 1940. The brigade was relieved from assignment to the division on 16 October 1939, and moved to Pierrepont, New York as a separate infantry brigade on 29 March 1940. The 2nd Infantry Brigade remained at Pierrepont until 1 June 1940, when it returned to Fort Ontario and was inactivated on the same day.

After the army's conversion to the triangular division, only two separate brigades were formed during World War II, the 1st Airborne Infantry Brigade (the former 1st Brigade, 1st Infantry Division) and the 2nd Airborne Infantry Brigade, both formed in 1943. The 2nd Infantry Brigade was reactivated and redesignated on 30 June 1943 as the 2nd Airborne Infantry Brigade. The brigade included the 507th Parachute Infantry Regiment and the 508th Infantry Regiment.

==== Order of battle ====
- Headquarters and Headquarters Company (HHC)
  - 507th Parachute Infantry Regiment (507th PIR)
  - 508th Parachute Infantry Regiment (508th PIR)

The 2nd Airborne Brigade deployed to Northern Ireland in January 1944 under the command of Brigadier General George P. Howell. Major General Matthew B. Ridgway, the commander of the 82nd Airborne Division and the senior airborne officer in the European Theater, decided to make organizational changes to the 82nd and 101st Airborne Divisions prior to D-Day.

As the 82nd had left one of its parachute regiments (the 504th) in Italy and arrived in the European Theater with one parachute regiment (the 505th) and one glider regiment (the 325th), Ridgway attached the brigade headquarters, 507th, and 508th Parachute Infantry Regiments to his division and placed Howell as a second assistant division commander. The 101st Airborne Division had arrived in theater under the original airborne division organization of one parachute infantry regiment (the 502nd) and two glider infantry regiments (the 327th and 401st). Ridgway broke up the 401st, assigning its 1st Battalion to the 327th and its 2nd Battalion to the 82nd's 325th. This gave the 82nd and 101st Airborne Divisions each three parachute infantry regiments and one three-battalion glider infantry regiment (instead of two glider infantry regiments, each with two battalions). The 2nd Airborne Brigade headquarters was disbanded on 15 January 1945 in Europe.

=== Cold War ===
On 15 February 1958 the 2nd Infantry Brigade was re-activated at Fort Devens, Massachusetts as the Pentomic 2nd Infantry Brigade with its own shoulder sleeve insignia. It spent the next five years training in northern Massachusetts and Cape Cod. The Brigade was prepared to support the Marines landing in the 1958 Lebanon crisis but did not deploy. Fort a period, the brigade was commanded by Joseph W. Stilwell Jr..

==== Order of battle ====
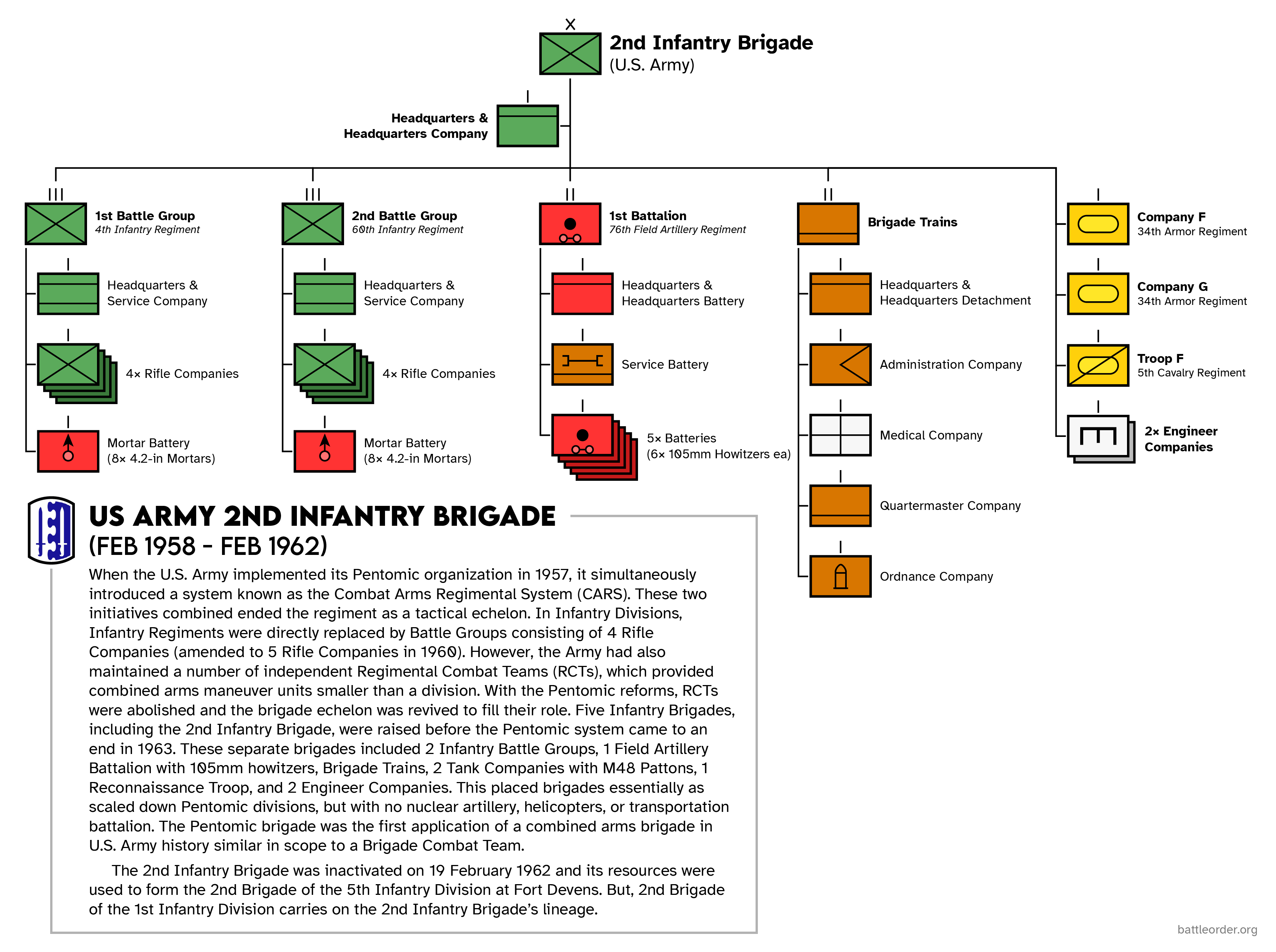
2nd Infantry Brigade organization of 1958

- Headquarters and Headquarters Company (HHC)
  - 1st Battle Group, 4th Infantry
  - 2nd Battle Group, 60th Infantry
  - 1st Battalion, 76th Artillery
  - Company F, 34th Armor
  - Company G, 34th Armor
  - Troop F, 5th Cavalry
  - Brigade Trains
  - 2 Engineer Companies

It was inactivated on 19 February 1963 at Fort Devens; in 1962 when it was reflagged as 2nd Brigade, 5th Infantry Division. It was reactivated on 23 October 1963 as Headquarters and Headquarters Company, 2nd Brigade, 1st Infantry Division and moved (with the rest of the Division) to Fort Riley, Kansas in January 1964.

=== Vietnam ===
On 12 July 1965, the 2nd Brigade landed at Cam Ranh Bay and Vũng Tàu, making it the first element of an Infantry Division to arrive in Vietnam. On 30 July 1969, the unit was visited by President Richard Nixon on his visit to South Vietnam. He met with the troops in Di An. The brigade returned to Fort Riley, Kansas in April 1970.

=== Gulf War ===
The Dagger Brigade deployed from Fort Riley, Kansas to Saudi Arabia in December 1990 as part of the United States' offensive buildup. The brigade was commanded by Colonel Anthony Moreno. The brigade was composed of 2d Battalion, 16th Infantry; 3d Battalion, 37th Armor; and 4th Battalion, 37th Armor, plus supporting units. The brigade redeployed to Fort Riley in May 1991.

=== Bosnia and Herzegovina ===
On 15 February 1996 the Dagger Brigade was relocated with the rest of the 1st Infantry Division to Europe. The Dagger Brigade replaced the U.S. 3rd Infantry Division's Raider Brigade in Schweinfurt, Germany.

Also in February 1996 the Dagger Brigade deployed units to Bosnia and Herzegovina to participate in Operation Joint Endeavor with the US 1st Armored Division.

On 7 October 1996, the Brigade Combat Team deployed to Bosnia to cover the US 1st Armored Division's redeployment to Germany. The brigade participated in Operation Joint Endeavor and Operation Joint Guard, and served as a stabilization force. The brigade redeployed to Schweinfurt in May 1997, except for the 1st Battalion, 77th Armor task force, which stayed in Bosnia until November 1997.

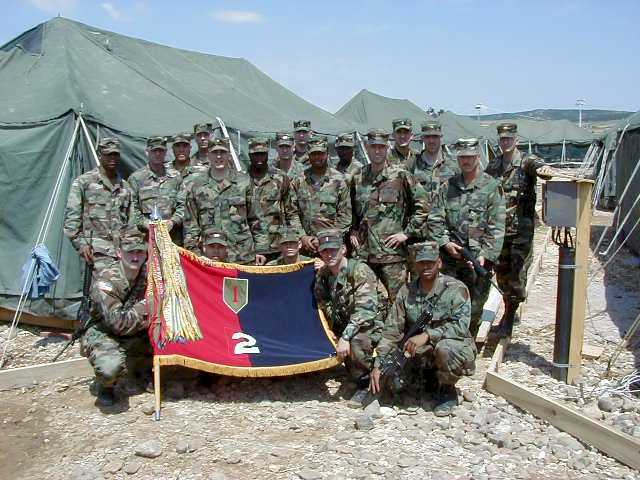
Members of the 2d Brigade pose with their brigade colors after they were unfurled in Kosovo in 1999.

=== Kosovo ===
The Dagger Brigade served in Kosovo in 1999–2000 and again in 2002–03. The Dagger Brigade deployed to the Balkans twice in 1999, first as part of Task Force Sabre in Macedonia, then in Kosovo as part of Task Force Falcon. Task Force Falcon served as the U.S. component of the NATO-led Kosovo Force (KFOR) with the mission of conducting peacekeeping operations in the Federal Republic of Yugoslavia'a Serbian Kosovo province.

TF Falcon was under the command of the 1st Infantry Division and included elements from the 1st Armored Division. The Dagger Brigade entered the war-torn province of Kosovo on 12 June 1999. TF Falcon headquartered at Camp Bondsteel, and grew into a Multi-National Brigade, including units from Greece, Russia, Poland, Ukraine, Lithuania, and the UK.

Initial efforts focused on monitoring and verifying the withdrawal of former Federal Republic of Yugoslavia (now Serbia and Montenegro) forces and later the demilitarization and transformation of the Kosovo Liberation Army.

The Dagger Brigade rotated to Kosovo again in 2002, this time focused on maintaining the secure environment established by coalition forces.

=== Operation Iraqi Freedom II ===
In January 2003, elements of the Dagger Brigade deployed to Turkey to support Operation Iraqi Freedom. Initial efforts were to prepare the way for the U.S. 4th Infantry Division to invade Iraq from the north. When the Turkish government denied access through their border, the 2nd brigade returned to Germany.

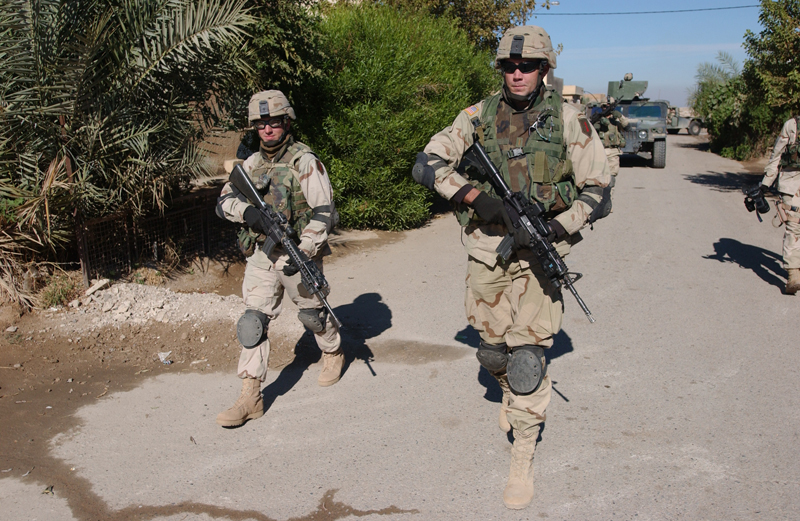
Soldiers from Alpha Company, 1st Battalion, 18th Infantry Regiment, 2nd Brigade Combat Team, 1st Infantry Division on patrol in Iraq in November 2004.

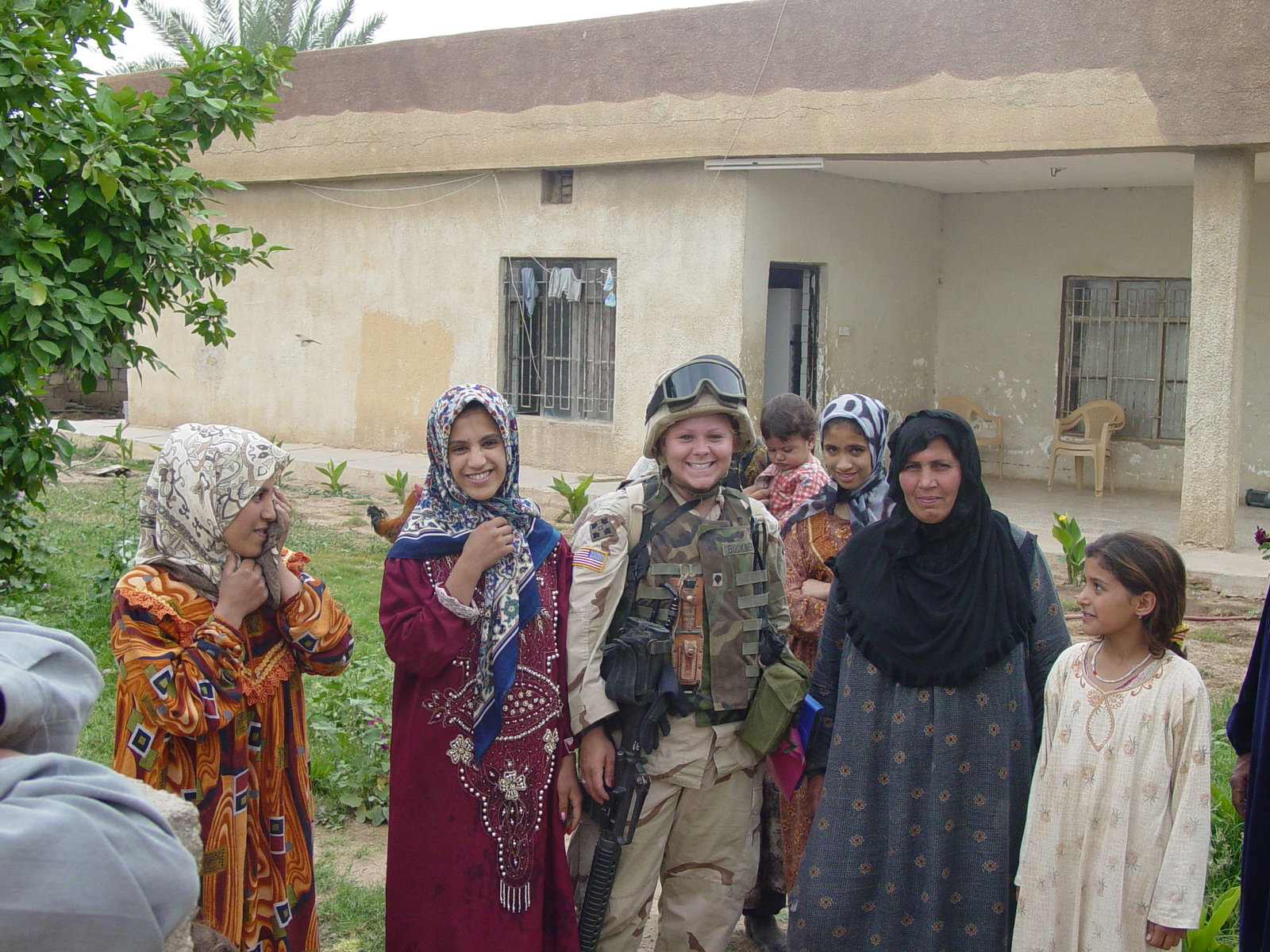
2nd Brigade, 1st Infantry Division Soldier poses with local women at a medical clinic assessment in Iraq in May 2004.

In February 2004, the Dagger Brigade deployed to northern Iraq to serve as part of the occupation force.
The Brigade Combat Team included:

- Headquarters and Headquarters Company (HHC)
  - 1st Battalion, 18th Infantry Regiment
  - 1st Battalion, 26th Infantry Regiment
  - 2nd Battalion, 108th Infantry Regiment
  - 1st Battalion, 77th Armor Regiment
  - Troop E, 4th Cavalry Regiment (Brigade Recon Troop)
  - 1st Battalion, 7th Field Artillery Regiment
  - 9th Engineer Battalion
  - 299th Forward Support Battalion (299th BSB)
  - 121st Signal Battalion

=== Operation Iraqi Freedom 06-08 ===
In August 2006 the 2nd Brigade Combat Team again deployed in support of Operation Iraqi Freedom from their home station in Schweinfurt, Germany. Task Force 1–26 (BLUE SPADERS) was sent ahead of the main body in an effort to curb the growing violence in Adamiyah, Shab and Uhr in North East Baghdad, Iraq. The Dagger BCT followed in September 2006 and assumed the mission as the CENTCOM reserve, positioned in Kuwait. Shortly after arrival in Kuwait, TF 1–77 AR (STEEL TIGERS) was deployed to Ramadi and TF 1–18 IN (VANGUARDS) was deployed to FOB Falcon, in the Rashid District of Baghdad, Iraq. The BCT Headquarters along with the 9th Engineers (GILAS), 1–7 FA (FIRST LIGHTNING), the 299th Forward Support Battalion (LIFELINE) and the BCT's four separate companies, were deployed to Camp Liberty, Baghdad. Echo troop 4th cavalry regiment was assigned as the brigade reconnaissance team at the liberty base complex, with the 2nd brigade combat team MP platoon, who were later re-attached to Alpha battery 1-7 field artillery, serving as route reconnaissance/route clearance and the quick reaction force element at Forward Operating Base Justice in Khadamiyah district of Baghdad, Iraq.

The DAGGER BCT assumed responsibility for Coalition force activities in northwest Baghdad in late October 2006 following Operation Together Forward II. The BCT assumed command of 3 task forces already in Sector; TF 1–22 (REGULARS) in the Abu Ghraib area west of Baghdad, TF 8–10 CAV (ROUGH RIDERS) in the Ameriyah district and TF 1-23IN (TOMAHAWK), a Stryker infantry task force which operated mainly in the Ghazaliyah and Shulla districts of Baghdad.

Throughout the BCT's tour of duty, they effectively integrated and employed a total of nine attached task forces including TF 1-22IN, TF 8-10CAV, TF 1-23IN, TF 2-8CAV, TF 2–12 CAV, TF 1-325AIR, TF 1-5CAV, TF 2-32FA and TF 1–64 AR.

TF 1-22IN (1st BCT, 4th ID) transitioned the Abu Ghraib district to TF 2-8CAV (1st BCT, 1st CAV). TF 8–10 CAV (4th BCT, 4th ID) transitioned Ameriyah and Khadra to TF 1–5 CAV (2nd BCT, 1st CAV). TF 1-23IN (3/2 STRYKER) transitioned Ghazaliyah to TF 2-12CAV (4th BCT, 1st CAV) and the Tomahawks assumed responsibilities in Hurriyah and Khadamiyah. TF 1-325AIR (2nd BCT, 82nd) arrived as part of the surge and assumed responsibilities for Khadamiyah, Hurriyah and some of the most dangerous Shia zones in Baghdad. TF 1-64AR (3ID) relieved TF 1-5CAV for Khadra and Mansour, enabling TF 1-5CAV to fully focus efforts against Sunni extremists in Ameriyah. TF 2-32FA (4th BCT, 1st ID) assumed responsibilities for Yarmouk and Hateen, completing the DAGGER BCT stance for OIF 06-08. For the bulk of its deployment, DAGGER BCT employed five maneuver task forces, from five different BCTs from five different installations in the Continental United States.

Throughout the tour, 1-7FA was attached to the Victory Base Defense Force, but provided fire support to the Dagger BCT's efforts across Northwest Baghdad. The 9th Engineers established a route clearing capability dubbed "DAGGER IRON CLAW" which served to clear more than 50% of the routes in support of BCT, division and corps level efforts in Baghdad. The 299th Forward Support Battalion established a vital logistics support area in support of MND-Baghdad, and sustained the BCT and all attached and detached formations while concurrently operating the division detainee holding area annex.

Dagger BCT ultimately established 14 joint security stations, multiple safe neighborhoods and formally partnered with the Iraqi Security Forces in the Khadamiyah and Mansour Security Districts. Under Dagger BCT OPERATION MARBLE ARCH, sectarian violence was significantly reduced as the BCT fought to stop the expansion of Shia and Sunni criminals and extremists from the North East and West/South West respectively.

The BCT and ISF leadership joined forces with the Arrowhead Stryker BCT for OPERATION ARROWHEAD STRIKE 9, which enabled a true combined forces approach to eliminating Sunni extremist from critical areas across the Mansour and Khadamiyah security districts. These combined efforts fully integrated Coalition, ISF and Iraqi municipal service efforts and enabled the rapid expansion of safe neighborhoods and increased Iraqi civilian participation in the security and services efforts.

Under Dagger BCT OPERATION SEVENTH VEIL, corrupt ISF and governmental officials' influence was significantly reduced with several key, senior-level officials arrested. SEVENTH VEIL was conducted in full partnership with the leadership of the Kharkh Area Command. OPERATION SWITCHBLADE enabled the effective integration of volunteer security forces into the combined security plan of the Dagger BCT and partnered units of the Iraqi Kharkh Area Command, to include the combined units of the Khadamiyah and Mansour Security Districts. OPERATION OUR TOWN effectively linked the security apparatus with the essential services apparatus and served as a nexus for positive, real economic and essential service growth across northwest Baghdad.

The BCT effectively transitioned Coalition force responsibilities to the 2nd BCT of the 101st in November 2007 and the Brigade re-deployed to Schweinfurt, Germany. 61 soldiers from the brigade died during the deployment.

=== Return to CONUS ===
On 16 March 2008, 1st Infantry Division's presence in Europe formally ended when the 2nd (Dagger) Brigade in Schweinfurt, Germany reflagged as the 172nd Infantry Brigade. As part of the Grow the Army Plan announced 19 Dec 2007, the 172nd is one of two infantry brigades that will be activated and retained in Germany until 2012 and 2013. The other brigade is the 2nd Brigade, 1st Armored Division in Baumholder, Germany, which was reflagged to 170th Infantry Brigade on 15 July 2009. On 28 March 2008, the 3rd Brigade, 1st Armored Division (HBCT) inactivated at Fort Riley. The soldiers and equipment currently assigned were reflagged as 2d (Dagger) Brigade, 1st Infantry Division (HBCT), aligning all units on Fort Riley under the 1st Infantry Division.

=== Return to Iraq ===
In 2008, the 2nd Brigade Combat Team was composed of:

- Headquarters and Headquarters Company (HHC)
  - 5th Squadron, 4th Cavalry Regiment
  - 1st Battalion, 63rd Armor Regiment
  - 2nd Battalion, 70th Armor Regiment
  - 1st Battalion, 18th Infantry Regiment
  - 1st Battalion, 7th Field Artillery Regiment
  - 299th Brigade Support Battalion (299th BSB)
  - Special Troops Battalion (STB)

On 30 September 2008, the Dagger Brigade Combat Team held its deployment ceremony on the Cavalry Parade Field at Fort Riley, KS. In October 2008 the Dagger Brigade deployed to North West Baghdad in support of Operation Iraqi Freedom, they returned to Fort Riley September 2009 and then received the Meritorious Unit Commendation for their efforts in the support of Operation Iraqi Freedom.

=== Operation New Dawn ===
In November 2010, the Dagger Brigade deployed to Baghdad, Iraq in support of Operation New Dawn as an advise and assist brigade. The brigade was the only maneuver brigade in Baghdad and partnered with 7 Iraqi Army and Federal Police divisions and 2 corp level commands, which constituted half of the Iraqi government's security forces. They redeployed in November 2011.

=== AFRICOM ===
In 2013, the brigade was designated as the main force for Africom.

=== Operation Atlantic Resolve ===
The 2nd Brigade Combat Team, 1st Infantry Division has deployed to EUCOM as part of Operation Atlantic Resolve in September 2017.

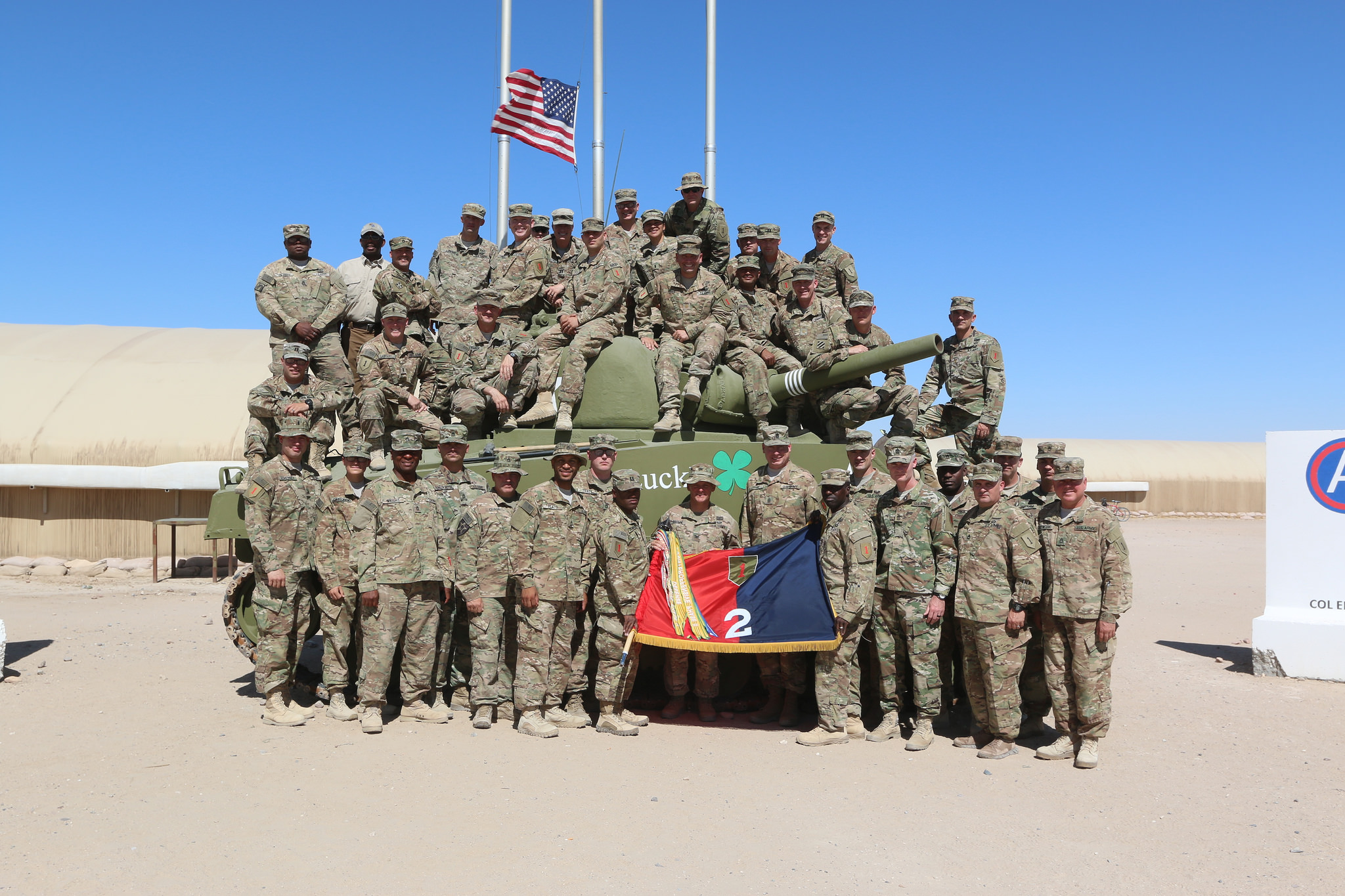
Members of the Dagger Brigade Staff pose in front of the brigade headquarters on 14 June 2016 at Camp Buehring, Kuwait.

=== Current Organization ===
2nd Armored Brigade Combat Team (2nd ABCT) (Dagger Brigade)

- Headquarters and Headquarters Company (HHC)
  - 5th Squadron, 4th Cavalry Regiment
  - 1st Battalion, 18th Infantry Regiment Vanguards
  - 1st Battalion, 63rd Armor Regiment Dragons
  - 2nd Battalion, 70th Armor Regiment Thunder Bolts
  - 1st Battalion, 7th Field Artillery Regiment (1-7th FAR) First Lightning
  - 82nd Brigade Engineer Battalion (82nd BEB)
  - 299th Brigade Support Battalion (299th BSB) Lifeline

== Distinctive unit insignia ==
On 11 December 1980 the 2nd Brigade was authorized their own distinctive unit insignia (DUI). It is described as "a silver device 1 1/4 inches in height overall consisting of a blue arrowhead on which is superimposed a silver lion."

The blue arrowhead and silver lion come from the brigade's two original regiments, the 26th Infantry Regiment ("Blue Spades") and the 28th Infantry Regiment ("Black Lions"). Since both the 1st and 2nd Brigades of the 1st Infantry Division were formed before the division, they are authorized their own DUI.

== Lineage ==
- Constituted 24 May 1917 in the Regular Army as Headquarters, 2nd Infantry Brigade, and assigned to the 1st Expeditionary Division (later redesignated as the 1st Division)
- Organized 8 June 1917 at New York City
- Reorganized and redesignated 1 April 1921 as Headquarters and Headquarters Company, 2nd Infantry Brigade
- Redesignated 23 March 1925 as Headquarters and Headquarters Company, 2nd Brigade
- Redesignated 24 August 1936 as Headquarters and Headquarters Company, 2nd Infantry Brigade
- Relieved 11 October 1939 from assignment to the 1st Division
- Inactivated 1 June 1940 at Fort Ontario, New York
- Redesignated 30 June 1943 as Headquarters and Headquarters Company, 2nd Airborne Infantry Brigade, and activated at Camp Mackall, North Carolina
- Disbanded 15 January 1945 in Europe
- Reconstituted 12 February 1958 in the Regular Army as Headquarters and Headquarters Company, 2nd Infantry Brigade
- Activated 15 February 1958 at Fort Devens, Massachusetts
- Inactivated 19 February 1962 at Fort Devens, Massachusetts
- Redesignated 23 October 1963 as Headquarters and Headquarters Company, 2nd Brigade, 1st Infantry Division
- Activated 2 January 1964 at Fort Riley, Kansas

== Honors ==
=== Campaign participation credit ===
- World War I
1. Montdidier-Noyon
2. Aisne-Marne
3. St. Mihiel
4. Meuse-Argonne
5. Lorraine 1917
6. Lorraine 1918
7. Picardy 1918
- World War II
1. Normandy
- Vietnam
1. Defense
2. Counteroffensive
3. Counteroffensive, Phase II
4. Counteroffensive, Phase III
5. Tet Counteroffensive
6. Counteroffensive, Phase IV
7. Counteroffensive, Phase V
8. Counteroffensive, Phase VI
9. Tet 69/Counteroffensive
10. Summer-Fall 1969
11. Winter-Spring 1970
- Southwest Asia
1. Defense of Saudi Arabia
2. Liberation and Defense of Kuwait
3. Cease-Fire

=== Decorations ===
- Meritorious Unit Commendation (Army) for VIETNAM 1969
- Army Superior Unit Award for 1996–1997
- Republic of Vietnam Cross of Gallantry with Palm for VIETNAM 1965–1968
- Republic of Vietnam Civil Action Honor Medal, First Class for VIETNAM 1965–1970
- Valorous Unit Award for Desert Shield / Desert Storm 1990–1991
- Valorous Unit Award for SAMARRA October 2004 – November 2004
- Valorous Unit Award for IRAQ February 2004 – February 2005 ( not on HRC Site)
- Meritorious Unit Commendation (Army) OPERATION IRAQI FREEDOM 06-08
- Meritorious Unit Commendation (Army) OPERATION IRAQI FREEDOM 08-09
- Meritorious Unit Commendation (Army) OPERATION NEW DAWN 10–11
- Meritorious Unit Commendation (Army) OPERATION INHERENT RESOLVE 15-16
