= Combat Aviation Brigade, 10th Mountain Division =

10th Combat Aviation Brigade, 10th Mountain Division
- Insignia of the 10th Mountain Division
- Active: 2 July 1988 - present
- Country: United States
- Branch: United States Army Aviation Branch
- Type: Combat aviation brigade
- Role: Aviation
- Size: Brigade
- Part of: 10th Mountain Division
- Garrison/HQ: Fort Drum, New York
- Engagements: War on terror; War in Afghanistan; Iraq War

The Combat Aviation Brigade, 10th Mountain Division is a combat aviation brigade of the United States Army based at Fort Drum, New York. It is a subordinate unit of the 10th Mountain Division.

Reactivated in 1988, the 10th Mountain Division's Combat Aviation Brigade supported the division as it undertook numerous operations and overseas contingencies in the 1990s, including Operation Restore Hope, Operation Uphold Democracy, and Task Force Eagle, as well as disaster relief following Hurricane Andrew. The brigade has since become involved in the war on terrorism, seeing four deployments to Afghanistan to support Operation Enduring Freedom and a deployment to Iraq to support Operation Iraqi Freedom. In 2019, the brigade deployed to Afghanistan in support of Operation Freedom's Sentinel.

== Organization ==
The Combat Aviation Brigade, 10th Mountain Division comprises five principal battalions under the command of its Headquarters and Headquarters Company (Renegades).

The brigade commands 1st Battalion (Dragons), 2nd Battalion (Knighthawks), 3rd Battalions (Phoenix), 10th Aviation Regiment, and 6th Squadron, 6th Cavalry Regiment (Six Shooters), which operate a number of aircraft including UH-60 Black Hawks, AH-64 Apaches and CH-47 Chinooks. In addition, the 277th Aviation Support Battalion (Mountain Eagle) provides supporting services to the combat battalions when they are deployed, making the brigade capable of operating independently of higher command headquarters, and capable of taking on additional battalions and other, smaller units when deployed, as necessary.

== History ==
The brigade HHC was constituted on 1 April 1988 as Headquarters and Headquarters Company, Aviation Brigade, 10th Mountain Division, and activated at Fort Drum, New York. The brigade was activated at Griffiss Air Force Base in Rome, New York as part of the 10th Mountain Division (Light Infantry) on 2 July 1988. The brigade relocated to Fort Drum in 1992. As per an article by the order of battle analyst Andy Johnson, the 10th Combat Aviation Brigade was a part of the NATO and Warsaw Pact orders of battle. The brigade is listed as having the following composite units: 3rd Squadron, 17th Cavalry Regiment, and the C and D companies of the 25th Aviation Regiment.

The brigade has played a key role in all Division missions, including support for Hurricane Andrew relief in south Florida, in Somalia, Operation Uphold Democracy in Haiti, SFOR and KFOR missions in Bosnia and Kosovo and most recently Operation Enduring Freedom and Operation Iraqi Freedom. The 10th Combat Aviation Brigade has 12 CH-47s, 24 AH-64s, 30 OH-58s, and 50 UH-60s to assist the 10th Mountain Division to fight and win in any environment.

In Somalia from 1993 ('Operation Restore Hope and Operation Continue Hope') the 10th Mountain Division brought an aviation task force to support them in their UNOSOM II missions. Task Force Raven, built around 2nd Battalion, 25th Aviation Regiment, was a task organized aviation unit with a total of 52 attack, scout, lift, and medical evacuation aircraft. They flew over 6000 missions over the streets of Mogadishu. Twelve AH-1 Cobras made up the attack helicopter force. The lessons learned by this aviation task force are particularly useful for the rest of the conventional aviation units in the U.S. Army. Fortunately, LTC R. Lee Gore, commander of Task Force Raven ordered a detailed after action review upon the unit's return." During the Battle of Mogadishu on 3–4 October 1993, UH-1V and MH-60s moved casualties from the airfield to the 46th Combat Support Hospital at the U.S. Embassy compound. The battalion returned home in December 1993 – January 1994, relieved by the 4th Battalion, 4th Aviation Regiment, from Fort Carson. (Casper, 128)

=== Haiti 1994 ===
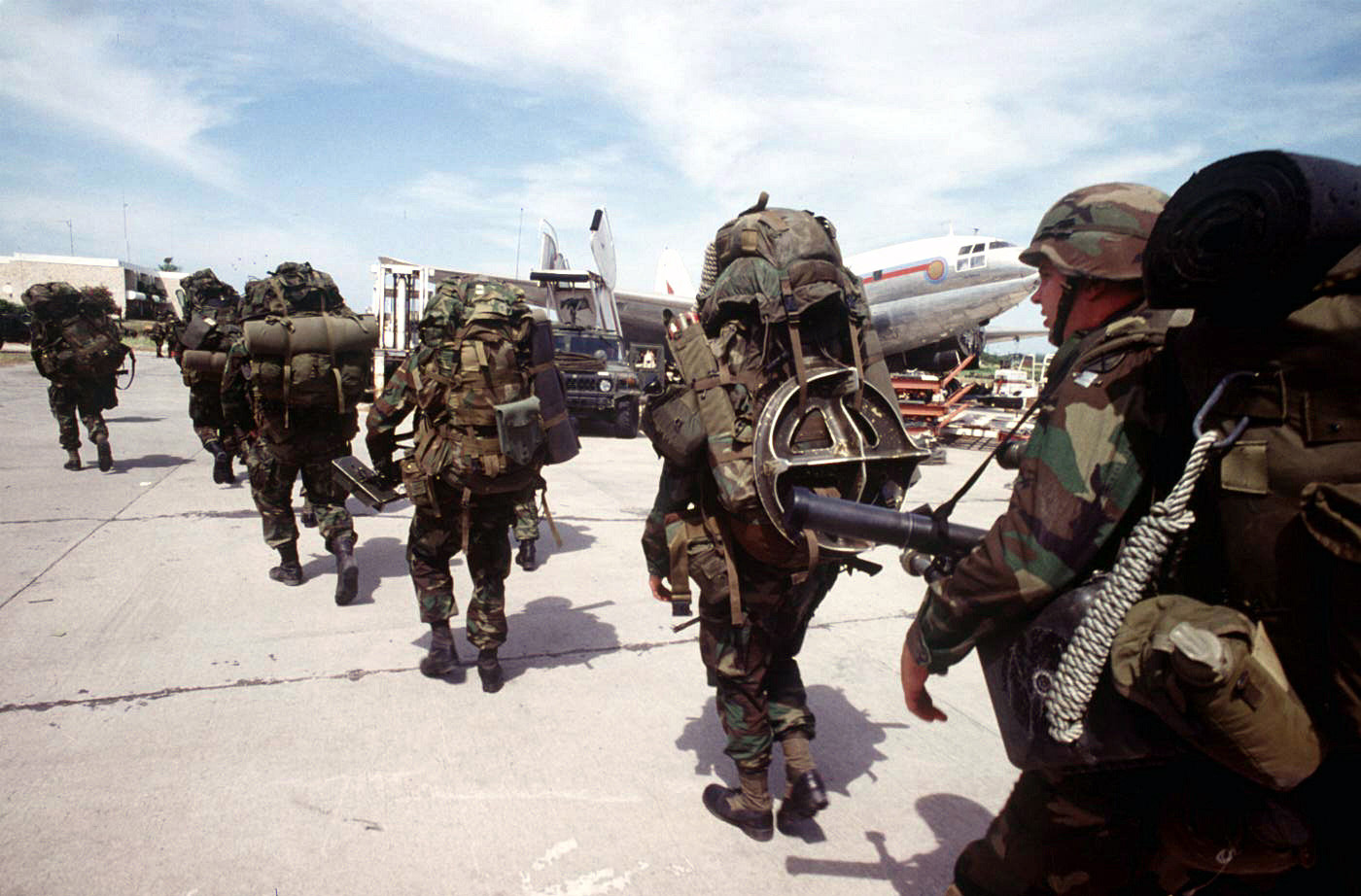
Soldiers of the 10th Mountain Division secure Port-au-Prince International Airport in 1994.

The division formed the nucleus of the Multinational Force Haiti and Joint Task Force 190 (JTF 190) in Haiti during Operation Uphold Democracy. More than 8,600 of the division's troops deployed during this operation. On 19 September 1994, the 1st Brigade conducted the Army’s first air assault from an aircraft carrier. This force consisted of 54 helicopters and almost 2,000 soldiers. They occupied the Port-au-Prince International Airport. This was the largest Army air operation conducted from a carrier since the Doolittle Raid in World War II.

=== Afghanistan Deployments ===
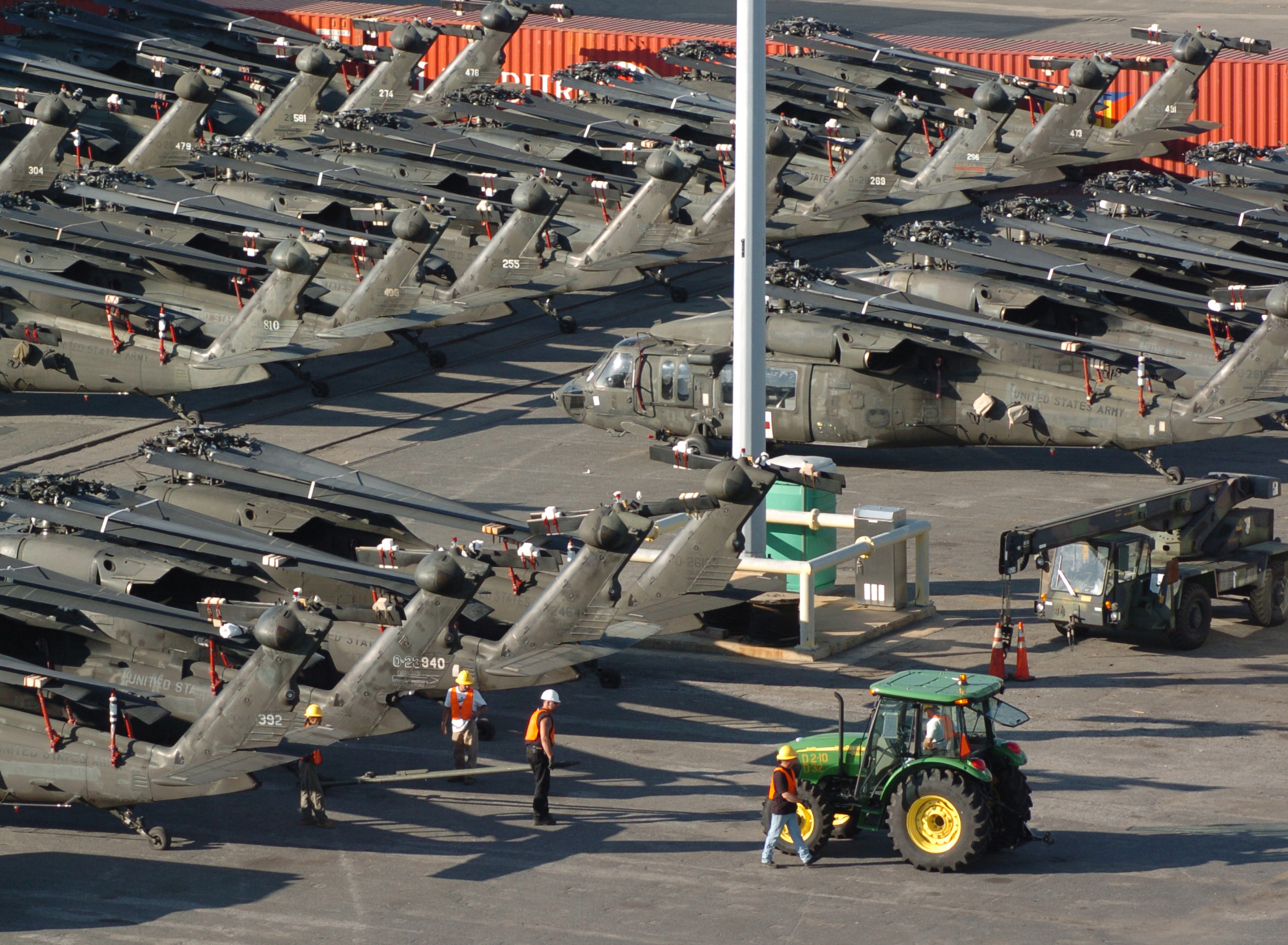
UH-60 Black Hawk helicopters of the 10th Combat Aviation Brigade are loaded into a ship in preparation for a 2008 deployment to Iraq.

In 2003 and into 2004, the brigade deployed for the first time to Afghanistan as part of Operation Enduring Freedom. As the only aviation brigade in the theater, the brigade provided air support for all U.S. Army units operating in the country. The brigade's mission at that time focused on close air support, medevac missions, and other duties involving combat with Taliban and Al-Qaeda forces in the country. The brigade returned to Fort Drum in 2004.

In winter 2006 the brigade was deployed again to Afghanistan to support Operation Enduring Freedom as the only aviation brigade in the theater, stationed at Bagram Air Base, Afghanistan. Named "Task Force Falcon," the brigade's mission was to conduct aviation operations to destroy insurgents and anti-coalition militia in an effort to help build the Afghan National Security Force's capability and allow the Afghan government to increase its capabilities. In addition, the Task Force provided logistical and aviation support for ISAF forces throughout the country, conducted tactical maneuvers and performed security and attack operations when needed.

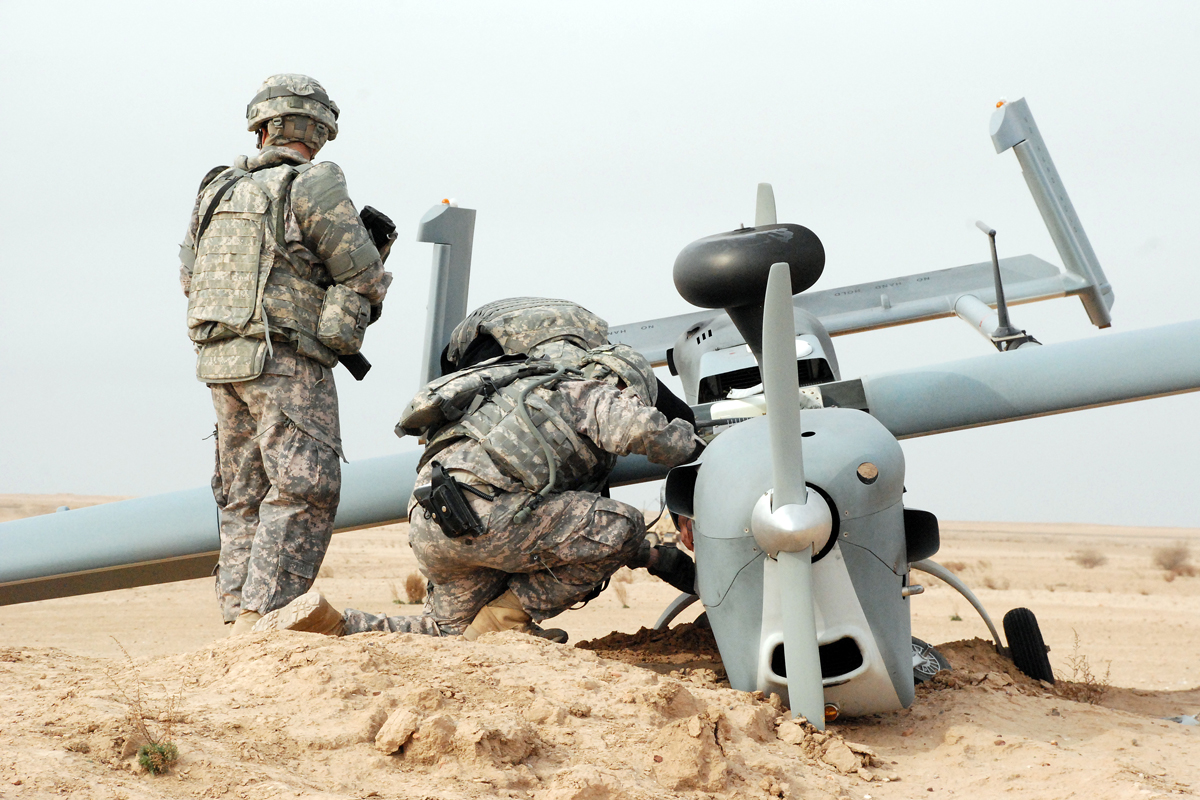
Soldiers of the brigade inspect a downed UAV.

Prior to the modular force structure reorganization, the 10th Aviation Brigade consisted of a Headquarters Company, 10th Aviation Brigade; 3rd Squadron, 17th Cavalry Regiment, 1st Battalion, 10th Aviation Regiment (United States) (formerly 2nd Battalion, 25th Aviation Regiment), 2nd Battalion (Assault), 10th Aviation Regiment (formerly 3rd Battalion, 25th Aviation Regiment); 3rd Battalion, 10th Aviation (General Support), and C Company (Aviation Intermediate Maintenance), 10th Aviation Regiment.

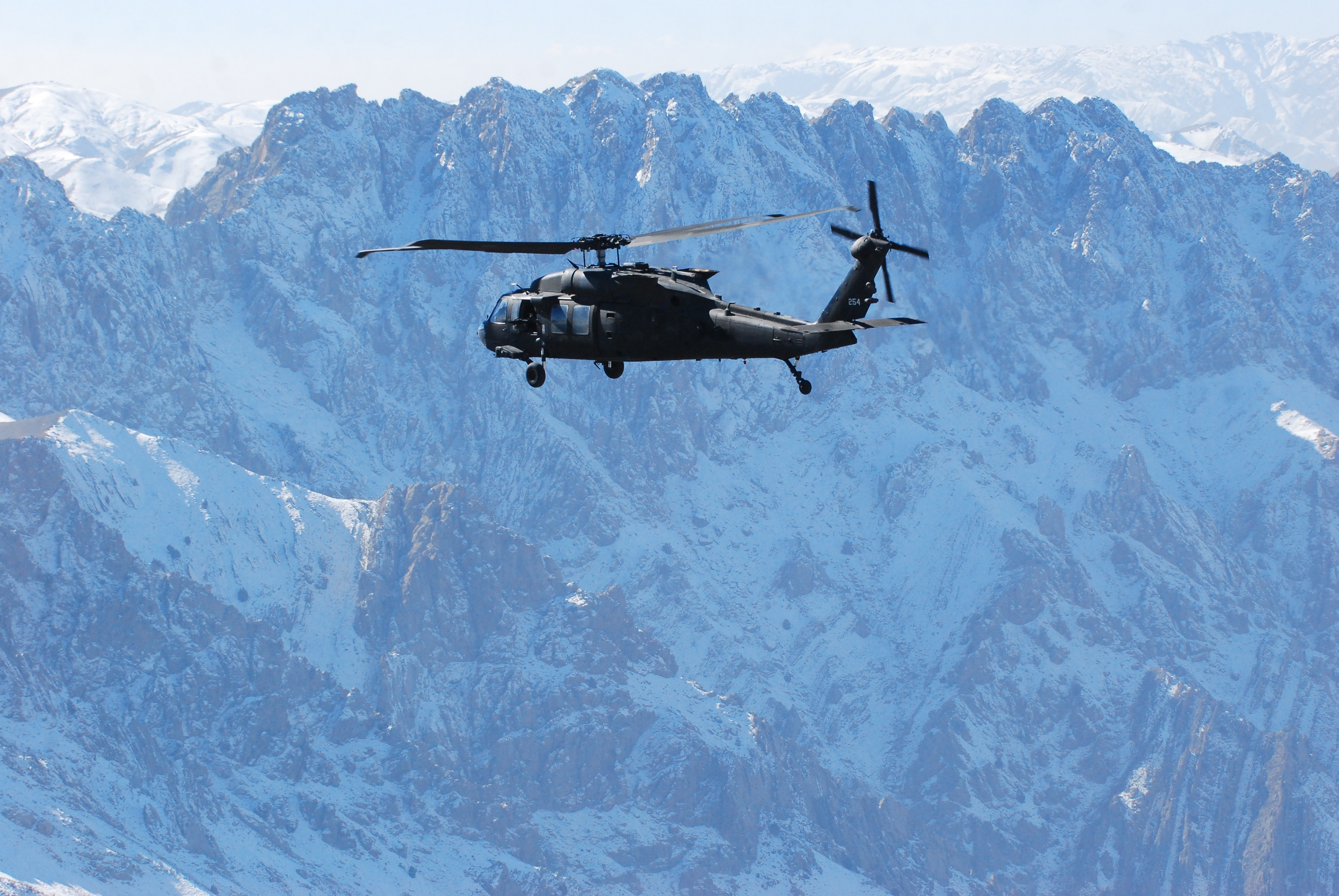
Helicopter of the brigade in Paktia Province, Afghanistan

After the transformation, the reorganized brigade retained the 3–17th Cavalry and 1- and 2–10th Aviation. 3–10th Aviation and C-10th Aviation were inactivated. Also reactivated as part of the reorganized unit were 6th Squadron, 6th Cavalry Regiment and the 277th Aviation Support Battalion. During the transition elements of the 10th Aviation continued to be deployed as part of Task Forces part of Operation Iraqi Freedom, with units returning to Fort Drum for reorganization after their tours were complete. Elements of the 10th Aviation Brigade were deployed to Iraq in 2008 as part of continued operations in that country.

Beginning March 2016, soldiers from the brigade participated in a week long over-water exercise with the Helicopter Sea Combat Squadron 2 of the US Navy at Wheeler-Sack Army Airfield. The 6th Squadron, 6th Cavalry Regiment of the brigade returned to the United States in June 2016 after a nine month long deployment in South Korea as part of US Forces Korea, in its role to augment the 2nd Combat Aviation Brigade.

Elements of the brigade also deployed in support of Operation Atlantic Resolve in 2017 in support of deterrence operations in the EUCOM theater. In 2019, the brigade deployed to Afghanistan in support of Operation Freedom's Sentinel.

A Black Hawk helicopter of the brigade struck the air traffic control tower at Griffiss International Airport after landing there on 16 June 2018. One member of its crew had a minor injury as a result.

The brigade conducted flight operations and training as part of Exercise Falcon Peak in Griffiss Airport in August 2021. The brigade conducted air assault exercises at Fort Drum and Griffiss Airport from 31st May to 1st June 2023. In May 2024, the brigade replaced the 82nd Combat Aviation Brigade in the United States Central Command (CENTCOM) as part of its operational deployment.

== Honors ==
The brigade has been awarded two Meritorious Unit Commendation (Army) for Somalia, and service in 'Afghanistan 2003–2004'. As of 6 February 2009, the Army's official lineage and honors website says that Campaign Participation Credit for the war on terrorism has 'yet to be determined.'
