= 77th Armor Regiment =

Tank unit of the United States Army

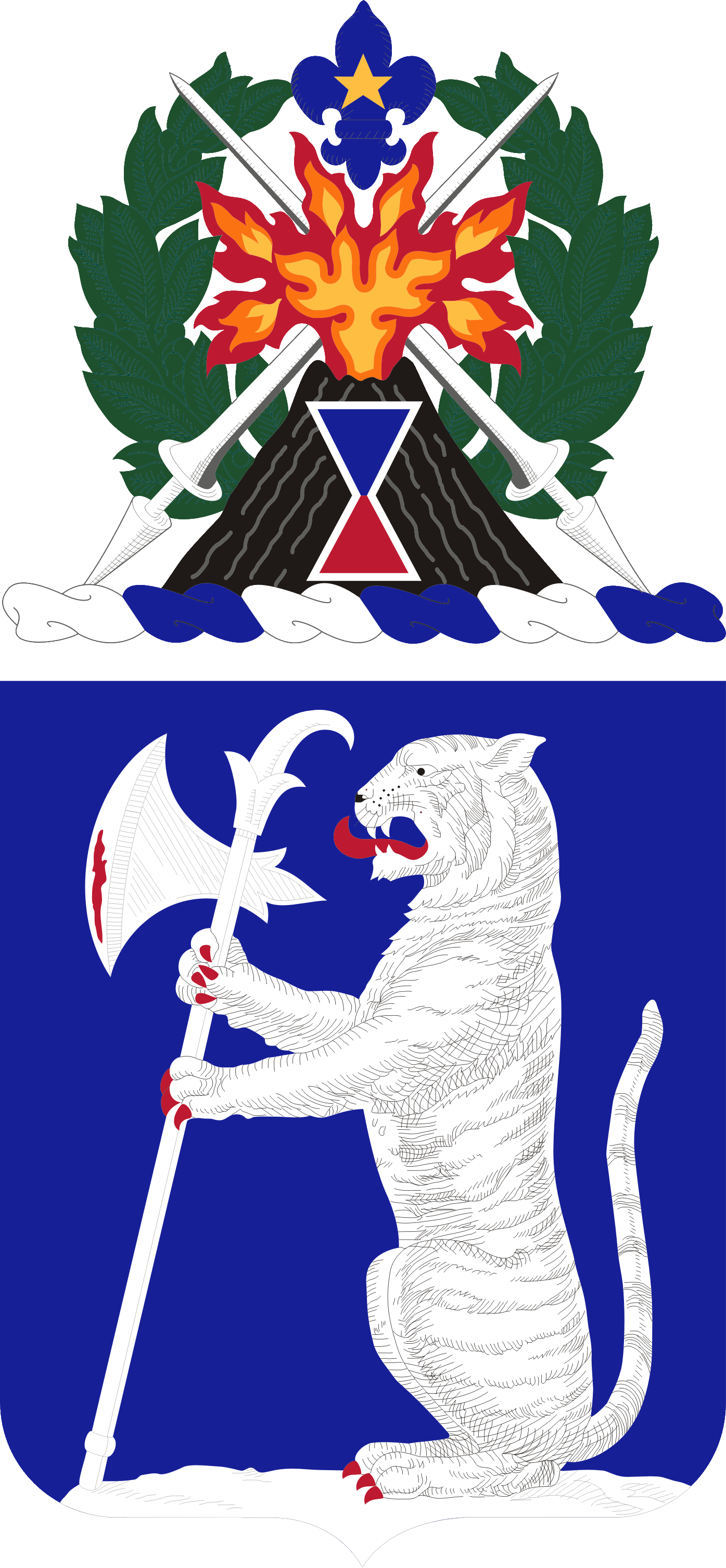
- 77th Armor coat of arms
- Active: 25 April 1941 – present.
- Country: US
- Branch: Armor Branch (United States)
- Type: Armor Regiment
- Part of: 3rd Brigade, 1st Armored Division
- Garrison/HQ: 1st Battalion: Fort Bliss, Texas
- Nickname: Steel Tigers
- Motto: Insiste Firmiter
- Colors: Blue, Silver and Red
- Anniversaries: 5 March 2008 = Became part of 4BCT 1AD
- Engagements: World War II; Korean War; Vietnam War; Iraq War

Commanders
- Notable commanders: LTC Wesley Clark, LTC Joseph B. Morgan

Insignia
- Distinctive Unit Insignia

The 77th Armor is an armored (tank) regiment of the United States Army. The 77th Armor Regiment is part of the U.S. Army Regimental System with only a single battalion, the 1st Battalion, 77th Armor Regiment, and is therefore classified as both a single battalion and the remainder of the Regiment itself. 1–77 AR is currently stationed at Fort Bliss, Texas as part of the 3rd Brigade "Bulldogs", 1st Armored Division and has transformed from a tank pure battalion into a combined arms battalion (CAB).

In 1976, Brigade 76 assigned the 1st Battalion 77th Armor to a six-month TDY assignment; The Battalion was situated at Wiesbaden Air Force Base.

== Heraldry ==
=== Distinctive unit insignia ===
- Description: A silver color metal and enamel device 1 1/8 inches (2.9 cm) in height overall consisting of the shield and motto of the coat of arms.
- Symbolism: The carnivorous tiger is symbolic of the "enemy devouring" qualities of the organization. Unlike the man-eating lion, which only attacks man in its dotage, the ferocious tiger attacks at all ages and at any time; the battle-axe symbolizes the offensive mission of a tank battalion.

=== Coat of arms ===
- Blazon:
  - Shield: azure, on a mount a tiger sejant argent, armed and langued gules, supporting a battle-axe in pale of the second, embrued of the third.
  - Crest: On a wreath of the colors argent and azure in front of a wreath of laurel proper and below two lances in saltire of the first a volcano sable inflamed overall proper and charged in base with an hourglass divided per fess gules and of the second and fimbriated of the first, above the flames a blue fleur-de-lis charged with a gold mullet.
  - Motto: INSISTE FIRMITER (To Stand Firm)
- Symbolism:
  - Shield: The carnivorous tiger is symbolic of the "enemy devouring" qualities of the organization. Unlike the man-eating lion, which only attacks man in its dotage, the ferocious tiger attacks at all ages and at any time; the battle-axe symbolizes the offensive mission of a tank battalion.
  - Crest: The volcano is an allusion to Mount Etna, the most distinctive feature of the island of Sicily, where the 77th Armor landed to begin its arduous World War II campaign history. The eruption of flames refers to the unit's subsequent participation in thirteen campaigns throughout Italy, France, Germany, and finally Korea. Two awards of the French Croix de Guerre, with Palm, are identified by the surrounding branches of laurel, while a third award with silver gilt star is marked by the star on the fleur-de-lis which refers to an assault landing in Southern France. Crossed lances denote the grand courage and aggressive spirit displayed by the men of this regiment throughout its many campaigns. The red and blue hourglass shape is an adaptation of the shoulder sleeve insignia of the 7th Division with which the 77th Armor served in Korea through six campaigns, twice receiving the Korean Presidential Unit Citation.

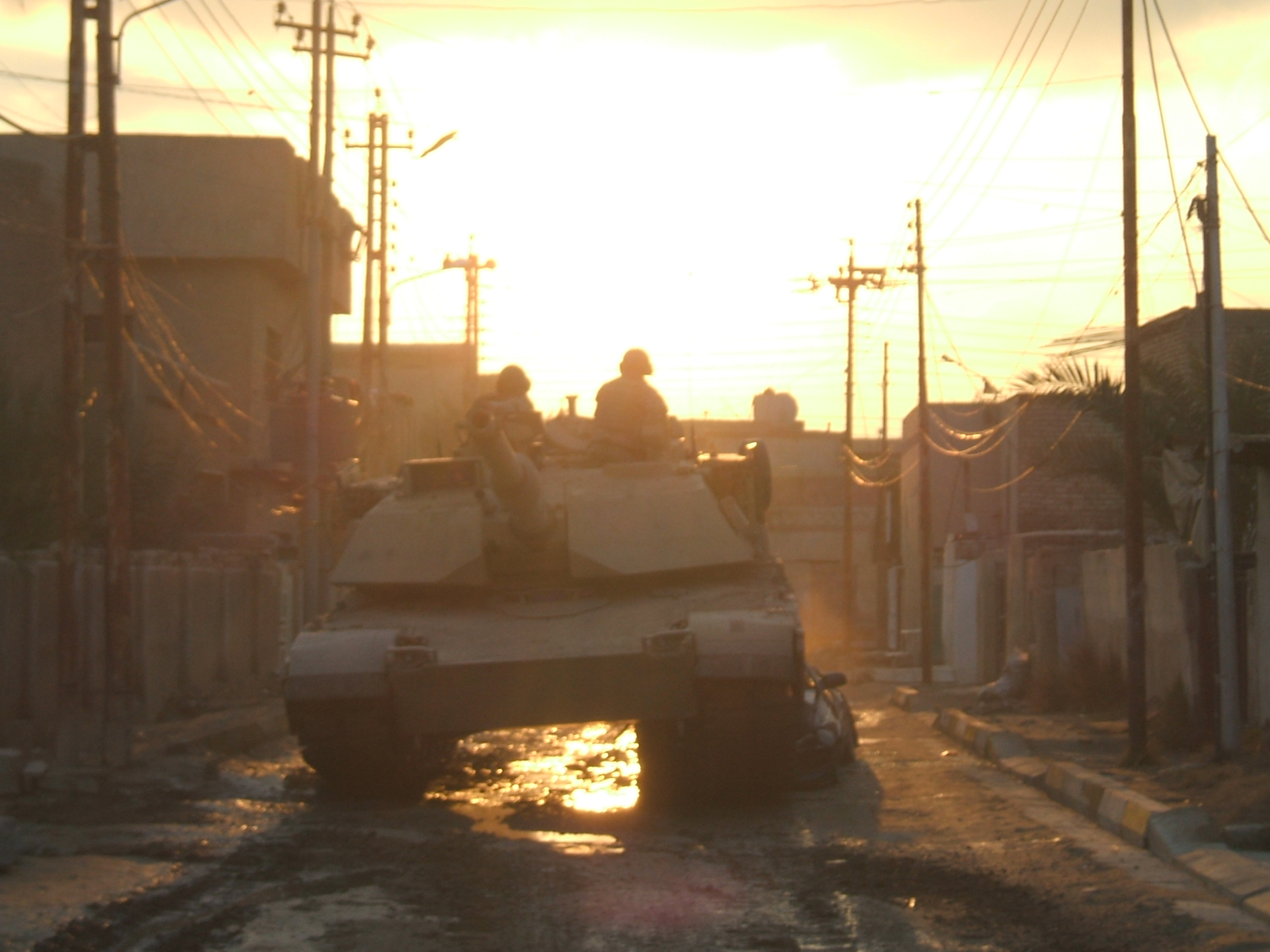
An M1A1 Abrams Main Battle Tank from Company A, 1st Battalion, 77th Armor Regiment destroys an insurgent vehicle in Baghdad, Iraq in 2007

== History ==
=== World War II ===
The regiment was originally constituted in the Army of the United States on 25 April 1941 as the 73rd Tank Battalion, and redesignated on 8 May 1941 as the 753rd Tank Battalion. It was activated on 1 June 1941 at Fort Benning, Georgia. The unit transferred to Camp Polk, Louisiana, later that month, and was assigned to the General Headquarters Reserve. Equipment and vehicles used to fill out units varied, allowing training to begin. Later in 1941 and early in 1942, the battalion received M3 Lee medium tanks and other current vehicles and equipment. It was then posted to Camp Hood, Texas, in April 1942 for eight months of general training in tank-only operations. The battalion was posted to Camp Pickett, Virginia, during January 1943 and attached to the 45th Infantry Division. The battalion received its first M4A1 medium tanks, and two months of training followed focusing on gunning and small unit operations.

==== North Africa ====
During April 1943, the 753rd was posted to Camp Patrick Henry, Virginia, for their deployment with the 45th Infantry Division overseas. The unit made a long 33-day trip on five LSTs. On 26 May 1943, the 753rd landed at several locations east of Oran and consolidated near the port city of Arzew, Algeria. By May 1943 the fighting in North Africa was all but over. The 753rd saw no combat, and instead spent six weeks in maintenance and training. From 5 to 7 July, the 753rd loaded on LSTs. The battalion was to support landings by the 45th ID, II US Corps, 7th Army (Lt Gen George S Patton's command) in Operation Husky for the invasion of Sicily.

==== Sicily ====
During the 39-day campaign on Sicily, the 753rd Tank Battalion never fought as an entire tank battalion. Tanks were deployed as companies, platoons and sections in support of the 45th Infantry Division's 157th, 179th and 180th infantry Regiments. The unit also supported the 1st Infantry Division's 16th, 18th and 26th Infantry, the 3rd Infantry Division's 7th and 30th Infantry, elements of the 82nd Airborne Division, and a task force formed around the 70th Tank Battalion. At times, the battalion was under the operational control of the US II Corps. On 10 July 1943, Company C of the 753rd landed on Blue Beach near Santa Croce Camerina, east of Gela. Company C supported the 157th Infantry against Italian armor in heavy action, seizing Comiso and the airport. On 11 July the remainder of the battalion landed on Blue Beach. Company B of the 753rd supported the 82nd Airborne Division attacking the Vittoria area and repelled a heavy enemy counterattack late on the 11th. On 12 and 13 July, Company B of the 753rd supported the 180th Infantry during very heavy fighting for the airport at Biscari. From 13 to 16 July, Company A of the 753rd supported the 179th Infantry in attacks against Caltagirone. From 16 to 22 July, Company A of the 753rd, attached to the 70th Tank Battalion, supported the 6th, 18th and 26th Infantry of the 1st Infantry Division in securing the crossroads at Enna, then went northeast to Alimena, Bompieto, and Petralia.

===== North Shore Road =====
23 July Company C, 753rd supported the 157th Infantry Regiment in attacking Campofelice di Roccella and the high ground on the northern Sicilian shore. On 8 August, one tank platoon from Company B, 753rd supported troops of the 3rd Infantry Division in amphibious landings behind enemy lines on the north shore at Sant Agata and again on 11 August at Brolo. Company B, 753rd received the Presidential Unit Citation, as did all units in the battalion landing team. In early August, Company C, 753rd supported the 157th Infantry's landing near Milazzo without any enemy resistance.

===== Messina =====
On 16 August, the 3rd Platoon of Company B supported the 2nd Battalion, 7th Infantry, 3rd Infantry Division's attack on Messina. 3rd Platoon was instrumental in making attack a success, allowing the 2/7th Infantry to be the first Allied unit into Messina, only two sea miles from the Italian coast.

===== Overall results =====
Effect 753rd had during their first combat supporting infantry was outstanding. Tankers helped account for 250 enemy troops killed, 1100 captured, 100 vehicles destroyed. Included 28 enemy tanks. 753 casualties, six killed, accidents claimed three, 22 wounded, and five captured. 753rd lost six M4A1 tanks and one M3 half-track.

- Japan 1949–50

Company A 77th Heavy Tank Battalion (77th HTB) organized and assigned 7th Infantry Division in 1949. Unit stationed Chitose, Hokkaido Japan June 1949 to August 1950. Mission occupation duty. Company equipped with M24 light tanks. No other companies were organized.

- Korea 1950

Yokohama Japan – Early July 1950 Company A's 1st Platoon 77TH HTB deployed South Korea as 8th Army's 8064th Heavy Tank (Provisional)Tank Platoon. Equipped with three M26 tanks. 1st Platoon engaged North Korean troops near Chinju with heavy casualties during UN Defensive campaign.

Yokohama Japan – August 1950 Company A 77th HTB redesignated Company A 77th Medium Tank Battalion (77th MTB). Company A's 1st (-), 2nd and 3rd Platoons with replacements expanded to three complete tank companies for training with M4A4E8s tanks in Yokohama area. Early September Company A 77th MTB was redesignated 17th, 31st and 32nd Regimental Tank Companies assigned to 7th ID infantry regiments.

Inchon South Korea – Regimental tank companies 17th, 31st and 32nd (77th MTB) participated in Operation Chromite (UN Offensive campaign), Inchon-Seoul landings September 1950 supporting left flank of 1st Marines Division. Units advanced into the City of Seoul and south forward Pusan in heavy fighting. Hostilities for tankers ended by 30 September. By early October regimental tank units had redeployed for refitting and maintenance in the Pusan area.

Iwon-Hungnam North Korea – Tankers (77th MTB) participated Iwon-Hungnam Landings November 1950 during UN Offence campaign. Starting 9 November 17 and 32 Tankers (77th MBT) land at Iwon in support of infantry. Deployed north toward Cho-ri area on North Korean coast. November 32 Tank Company (77th MBT) supported infantry in campaign in Pujon (Fusen) Reservoir area. Battle of Kapsan – 15 November 17th Tank Company (77th MTB) supported infantry crossing Ungi River. Attack in Kapsan area. 20 November reach Hyesanjin City on Yalu River along China's southern border with North Korea. 31 November Tank Company (Task Force Mclean/Fath) support infantry campaign in Changjin (Chosin) Reservoir area. Battles for Hill 1221 November. Night battle at Haguru-ri December. December 1950 – Chinese (CCF Intervention campaign) troops attacked across Yalu River. All tank companies with infantry redeploy to Hungnam for evacuation from North Korea.

- Vietnam 1968

South Vietnam I Corp – July 1968 1st Battalion 77th Armor (1–77) deployed from Fort Carson Colorado USA to Wunder Beach, Quảng Trị Province, South Vietnam. Mid-August Battalion deployed to positions in Leatherneck Square south of the Vietnamese Demilitarized Zone (DMZ) in support of 3rd Marine Division infantry operations during heavy fighting.

US Army FRAG ORDER 5 to OPORD 2–68 Sign by PICKARTS LTC and THOMAS S-3 1–77 YD 139615 1700 hours 31 Aug 1968 1. MISSION. TF 1–77 Armor conducts search and destroy operation through area of operation with two teams attacking abreast. 2. Team A (A/1-77): Assume security of C-3 at 0600 2 Sept until return of Team B (B/1-61 Inf (-) 1&2/C1-77 Scouts).

Early September Typhoon Bess hits land in I Corp disrupting all military operations for several days. 13 September 1968 – 1–77 participated in heavy fighting during Operation Sullivan in Kinh Mon area northeast of Con Thien in support of 11th and 61st Infantry. This was the first brigade size operation. Late October 1968 Company B 1–77 supported 61st Infantry in heavy fighting in Kinh Mon area during Operation Rich. 1 November 1968 1–77 redeployed to positions south of Quảng Trị City supporting infantry operations along coast and Base Area 101 to west during Operation Napoleon/Saline and Marshall Mountain.

- Vietnam 1969

From time to time it became involved within 3d Marine Division operations on the Khe Sanh plains and up to the vicinity of the DMZ with the US Marines. In total, the 1st Battalion, 77th Armor participated in eight campaigns during its tour in Vietnam.

- Operation Iraqi Freedom

In February 2004 the 1st Battalion, 77th Armor Regiment deployed from Schweinfurt, Germany to Balad, Iraq as part of the 2nd "Dagger" Brigade Combat Team is support of OIF II. The battalion occupied Forward Operating Base Paliwoda and Logistic Support Area Anaconda. They redeployed to Schweinfurt, Germany in February 2005.

On 28 August 2006 the 1st Battalion, 77th Armor Regiment deployed from Schweinfurt, Germany as part of the 2nd "Dagger" BCT, 1st ID in support of OIF 06–08. The battalion was task organized, with its B Company attached to Task Force 1–26 Infantry and A Company attached to TF 1–18 Infantry. In return TF 1–77 Armor received the B Companies from both infantry battalions, a company of Combat Engineers from 9th Engineer Battalion, a Fire Support Team from 1–7 Field Artillery, and a Maintenance Support Team from 299th Forward Support Battalion. In early October 2006 the Task Force moved north from Camp Buehring, Kuwait to Camp Ramadi, Iraq. The two detached companies, A and B, were sent to Baghdad, Iraq with their infantry task forces. The entire brigade's deployment was extended from 12 months to 15 months with the onset of the "Surge" in early 2007. They redeployed to Schweinfurt, Germany in November 2007.

In April 2009, the 1st Battalion, 77th Armor Regiment began deploying as part of the 4th Brigade Combat Team, 1st Armored Division to southern Iraq as part of the first Advise & Assist Brigade in Iraq. Task Force 1–77 was headquartered at COB Adder (also known as Tallil Air Base), adjacent to Nasiriyah, Iraq and was charged with security and assistance in Dhi Qar and Muthanna Provinces. In addition to its headquarters and an Alpha Company command post at COB Adder, its Bravo Company was moved to Basrah Province to assist with Multi-national Division-South (MND-S) security in the area. Charlie Company conducted operations from JSS Ur in Dhi Qar Province. HHC conducted operations through its Scout Platoon, which was based at JSS Jenkins and both lived and conducted operations with the 5th Tactical Support Unit (ISF) based in downtown Nasiriyah. The Mortar Platoon was based out of COB Adder and staffed the Provincial Joint Command Center which was also located within Nasiriyah. Delta Company conducted operations from JSS Soto (also known as JSS Eastern Barracks) in Muthanna Province as was the only American presence in the entire province. Elements of Alpha Company were attached to Task Force 2–29 to assist in Provincial Reconstruction Team (State Department) security and projects. During the deployment, 1–77 AR suffered the brigade's only combat death during the deployment when an explosively formed penetrator on 16 June 2009 killed a Delta Company Soldier in Samawah, Iraq. The battalion was recognized with a Meritorious Unit Citation for its service in Iraq. The battalion returned to Fort Bliss, Texas in May 2010.

In July 2011, the 1st Battalion, 77th Armor Regiment deployed again to Iraq as part of the 4th Brigade Combat Team, in support of Operation New Dawn and the closure of the Iraq Theater of Operations. The battalion performed as the theater's Operational Reserve, enabling the responsible closure of the remaining Forward Operating Bases across the country. The battalion returned to Fort Bliss, Texas in December 2011.

- Operation Enduring Freedom

In May 2012, the 1st Battalion, 77th Armor Regiment was called on again to deploy to Afghanistan in support of Operation Enduring Freedom. The battalion deployed several Security Force Assistance Advisory Teams (SFAAT) with the mission to train, advise, and mentor Afghan National Security Forces, in order to increase their capabilities and enable the drawdown of Coalition Forces in the Afghan Theater. The battalion returned to Fort Bliss, Texas in February 2013.

=== Lineage and honors ===
Constituted 25 April 1941 in the Army of the United States as the 73d Tank Battalion

Redesignated 8 May 1941 as the 753d Tank Battalion

Activated 1 June 1941 at Fort Benning, Georgia

Reorganized and redesignated 9 September 1942 as the 753d Tank Battalion, Medium

Reorganized and redesignated 29 March 1944 as the 753d Tank Battalion

Inactivated 15 January 1946 at Camp Patrick Henry, Virginia

Activated 1 August 1946 at Fort Knox, Kentucky

Inactivated 15 October 1946 at Fort Knox, Kentucky

Redesignated 20 March 1949 as the 77th Heavy Tank Battalion, assigned to the 7th Infantry Division, and activated in Camp Chitose Hokkaido Japan.

Redesignated 5 August 1950 as the 77th Medium Tank Battalion Yokohama Japan.

Redesignated late August as 17th, 31st and 32nd Regimental Tank Companies Yokohama Japan.

Relieved 10 October 1951 from assignment to the 7th Infantry Division

Inactivated 10 November 1951 Korea

Redesignated 24 January 1962 as the 77th Armor, a parent regiment under the Combat Arms Regimental System

Redesignated 19 February 1962 as Headquarters and Headquarters Company, 1st Battalion, 77th Armor, assigned to the 5th Infantry Division, and activated at Fort Carson, Colorado

Relieved 21 March 1973 from assignment to the 5th Infantry Division and assigned to the 4th Infantry Division

Withdrawn 16 February 1989 from the Combat arms Regimental System and reorganized under the United States Army Regimental System.

Inactivated 15 December 1989 at Fort Carson, Colorado, and relieved from assignment to the 4th Infantry Division

1st Battalion, 77th Armor Regiment is activated 5 April 1996 at Schweinfurt, Germany as part of the 2nd "Dagger Brigade" 1st Infantry Division (Mechanized).

1st Battalion, 77th Armor Regiment is redesignated 5 March 2008 at Fort Bliss, Texas as part of the 4th Brigade "Highlanders", 1st Armored Division

=== Campaign history ===
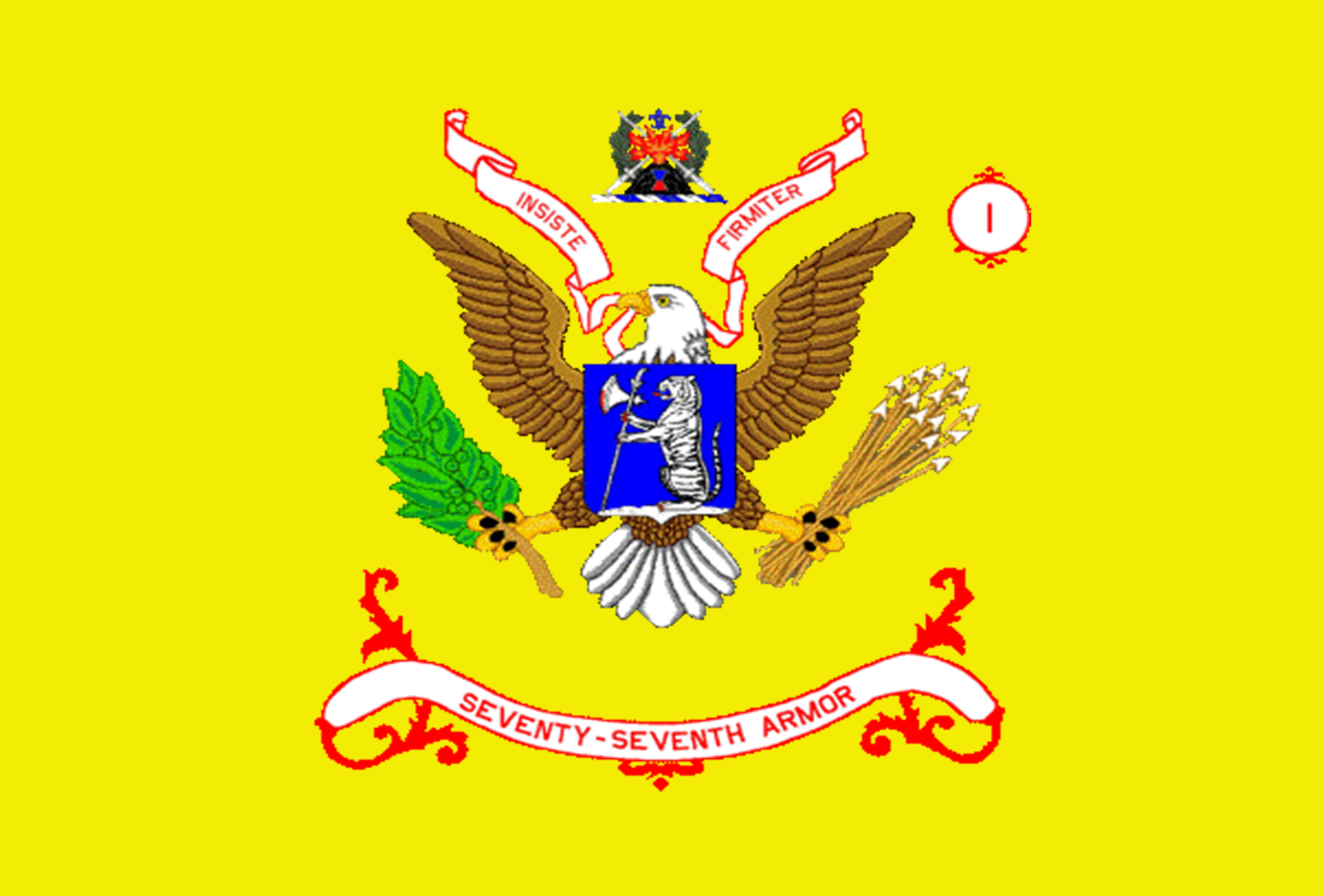
Battalion Colors of the 1st Battalion, 77th Armor Regiment

- World War II
  - Sicily
  - Naples-Foggia
  - Rome-Arno
  - Southern France
  - Rhineland
  - Ardennes-Alsace
  - Central Europe
- Korean War
  - UN Defensive
  - UN Offensive
  - CCF Intervention
  - First UN Counteroffensive
  - CCF Spring Offensive
  - UN Summer-Fall Offensive
- Vietnam War
  - Counteroffensive, Phase V
  - Counteroffensive, Phase VI
  - Tet 1969 Counteroffensive
  - Summer-Fall 1969
  - Winter-Spring 1970
  - Sanctuary Counteroffensive
  - Counteroffensive, Phase VII
  - Consolidation I
- Balkans
  - Operation Joint Guard, NATO intervention in Bosnia 1997
  - Operation Joint Guard II
  - NATO intervention in Kosovo 1999
  - NATO peacekeeping in Kosovo 2002
- Global war on terrorism
  - Operation Iraqi Freedom II
  - Operation Iraqi Freedom 06-08
  - Operation Iraqi Freedom 09-10
  - Operation New Dawn (Iraq) 11
  - Operation Enduring Freedom 12–13

=== Decorations ===
- 73rd Tank Battalion (independent)

French Croix de Guerre with Palm, World War II, Streamer embroidered CENTRAL ITALY

French Croix de Guerre with Palm, World War II, Streamer embroidered VOSGES

French Croix de Guerre with Silver-Gilt Star, World War II, Streamer embroidered ITALY

French Fourragère in the colors of the Croix de Guerre, World War II

- Company A 77th Medium Tank Battalion (17th, 31st, 32nd Tank Companies)

Republic of Korea Presidential Unit Citation, Streamer embroidered INCHON

Republic of Korea Presidential Unit Citation, Streamer embroidered KOREA 1950

Republic of Korea Presidential Unit Citation, Streamer embroidered KOREA 1950–1951

- 1st Battalion 77th Armor

Republic of Vietnam Cross of Gallantry with Palm, Streamer embroidered VIETNAM 1968

Republic of Vietnam Cross of Gallantry with Palm, Streamer embroidered VIETNAM 1971

- Company A 1st Battalion 77th Armor

Company A additionally entitled to the Valorous Unit Award, Streamer embroidered VIETNAM 1969

Navy Unit Commendation for Operation Iraqi Freedom VI-VIII, OCT 2006 – NOV 2007

Company A additionally entitled to the Valorous Unit Award for Operation Iraqi Freedom VI-VIII, 12 OCT 2006 – 17 NOV 2007

Company B additionally entitled to the Presidential Unit Citation for Operation Iraqi Freedom VI-VIII, 12 OCT 2006 – 17 NOV 2007

=== Commanders of the 753rd, Co A 77th Tank Bn, 77th Armor Regiment ===
- 753rd Medium Tank Battalion
  - COL Joseph G Felber
  - COL Charles Neill
- Company A 77th Heavy Tank Battalion
  - 1Lt Robert E Drake – June 1949 – August 1950 (Company A only. No other companies organized).
- 1st Battalion, 77th Armor Regiment
  - LTC John Maxwell Pickard – 1966 – Nov 1968
  - LTC Carmin Milia – Dec 1968 – May 1969
  - LTC Thomas Miller – June 1969 – Sept 1969
  - LTC Richard Meyer – 1971
  - LTC Wesley Clark – 1980–1982
  - LTC Rance Sopko
  - LTC Matthew L. Smith
  - LTC James K. Greer
  - LTC Timothy R. Reese
  - LTC William H. Hedges
  - LTC David S. Hubner, – 21 June 2005
  - LTC Miciotto O. Johnson, 21 June 2005 – February 2008
  - LTC Louis B. Rago II 2008, (right before 1–77 AR moved its colors to Ft. Bliss, Texas)
  - COL James D. Nickolas, March 2008 – 24 June 2008
  - LTC James J. Gallivan, 24 June 2008 – July 2010
  - LTC Lance D. Moore, July 2010 –May 2012
  - LTC Collin T. Hunton May 2012 – June 2014
  - LTC Tommy L. Cardone June 2014 – March 2016
  - LTC Johnny Mario Casiano March 2016 – January 2018
  - LTC Mark R. McClellan January 2018 - June 2020
  - LTC Michael Soyka June 2020 - June 2022
  - LTC Michael Porges June 2022 - July 2024
  - LTC Marc W. Jason, July 2024 – June 2026
  - LTC William W. Lassiter, IV June 2026 - Present
- 2nd Battalion, 77th Armor Regiment
  - LTC Timothy J. Gordon (unk)
  - LTC Frederick Benson 1980–1982
  - LTC K. Steven Collier 1993–1995
- 5th Battalion, 77th Armor Regiment
  - LTC Daniel R. Zanini (LTG, ret.) 1983–1985
  - LTC Joseph B. Morgan (Col, ret.) 1985–1987
  - LTC Thomas A. Horton 1987–1989
  - LTC Philip D. Allum 1989–1991
  - LTC Hank Sharpenburg 1991–1993
  - LTC Patrick J. Flynn 1993–1995

== See also ==
- List of armored and cavalry regiments of the United States Army
