= Genting Airport =

Genting Airport Lapangan Terbang Genting
- IATA: ~~GTB~~; ICAO: none

Summary
- Airport type: Public
- Serves: Genting, Pahang, Malaysia
- Time zone: MST (UTC+08:00)
- Coordinates: 03°33′00″N 101°52′59″E
- Interactive map of Genting Airport
- Source: WMAD (Bentong), the closest airfield to the nonexistent airport.

Genting Airport (IATA: ~~GTB~~) was a purported airstrip serving Genting in the state of Pahang in Malaysia. However, as of November 2012, IATA (in its Location Identifier Notification #40 bulletin, 2012) claimed back the GTB code because the airport could not be found. Published co-ordinates are

   Lat: 2.1166670322 (2°7'0"N)
   Lng: 111.6999969482 (111°41'59"E)   

Elevation 13.00ft These coordinates are in woods beside Sungai Binatang, a tributary to the Rajang near the main road 6308A.

== See also ==
- List of airports in Malaysia
