= 10th Aviation Regiment =

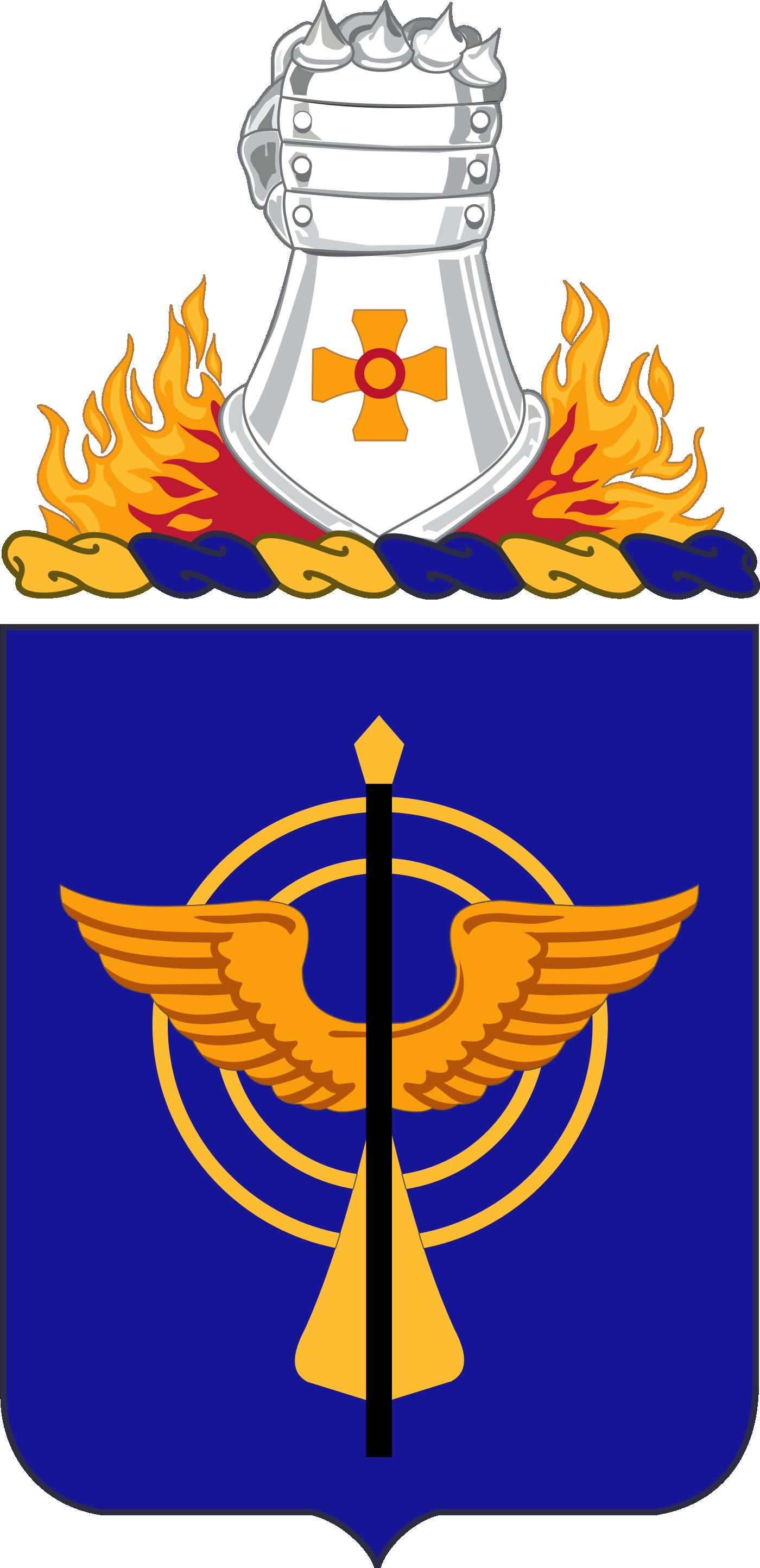
- Coat of Arms
- Active: 1957
- Country: United States of America
- Branch: United States Army
- Type: United States Army Aviation Branch
- Role: Aviation
- Part of: 10th Mountain Division (United States)
- Garrison/HQ: Fort Drum, New York
- Motto: Soldiers of the Sky
- Colors: Ultramarine Blue, Golden Orange

Insignia
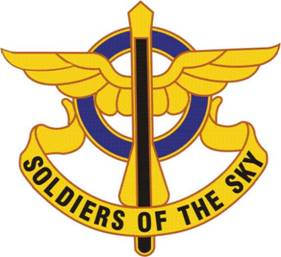
- Distinctive Unit Insignia

Aircraft flown
- Attack helicopter: AH-64D Apache
- Cargo helicopter: CH-47F Chinook
- Utility helicopter: UH-60M Black Hawk

The 10th Aviation Regiment is an aviation regiment (United States Army Aviation Branch) of the U.S. Army.

== History ==
The regiment was constituted 21 August 1965, in the regular Army as Headquarters and Headquarters Detachment, 10th Aviation Battalion. The battalion was activated 23 August 1965 at Fort Benning, Georgia, and redesignated as Headquarters and Headquarters Company, 10th Aviation Battalion on 1 December 1968.

10th Aviation was an important contributor to the United States Army's efforts in Vietnam. The unit provided critical Aviation support in the first Tet counter-offensive and distinguished itself by successfully fulfilling this vital role. 10th Aviation regularly repeated this standard for success in the intervening years and was recognized for valorous acts at Dak To and Tuy Hoa Valley. By the end of the Vietnam War, the unit had received two Army meritorious unit commendations and five awards for gallantry from the Republic of South Vietnam. After the war ended, the 10th Aviation Battalion was inactivated 30 December 1980 at Fort Lewis, Washington.

On 17 April 1986 the battalion were assigned to the 1st Armored Division and activated in Germany. They were relieved from assignment to the 1st Armored Division and inactivated on 16 November 1987 in Germany.

The unit was reorganized and re-designated on 2 October 1988 as the 10th Aviation, a parent regiment under the United States Army Regimental System, and transferred to the United States Army Training and Doctrine Command 1st Battalion was assigned to the 1st Aviation Brigade at Fort Rucker, Alabama. On 5 January 1996 they were consolidated with the 10th Aviation Company, and consolidated into a unit designated as the 10th Aviation.

== Current structure ==
- 1st Battalion (Attack) (TF Tigershark)
- 2nd Battalion (Assault Helicopter) (TF Knighthawk)
  - Headquarters and Headquarters Company (HHC) (Nomads)
  - A Company (Voodoo) (UH-60)
  - B Company (Wolfpack) (UH-60)
  - C Company (Warlords) (UH-60)
    - Afghanistan (October 2019 -)
  - D Company (Dragon Hawks)
  - E Company (Regulators) (FSC)
- 3rd Battalion (General Support) (TF Phoenix)
  - HHC (Hooligans)
  - A Company (War Angels)
  - B Company (Mountain Movers) (CH-47)
  - C Company (Blue Max)(Mountain Dustoff) (HH-60M)
  - D Company (Damage Inc)
  - E Company (Executioners)
  - F Company (Arctic Foxes)
- D Company (MQ-1C Gray Eagle)

== 1st Battalion (Attack) ==
1st Battalion, 10th Aviation Regiment currently is constituted as part of the Army's 10th Combat Aviation Brigade at Fort Drum, New York. It is tasked as an Attack Helicopter Battalion composed of Boeing AH-64D Apache helicopters. Its most recent iteration has deployed multiple times in support of the global war on terrorism.

The unit was originally constituted 17 April 1986 in the Regular Army as Company A, 10th Aviation Battalion, an element of the 1st Armored Division, and activated in Germany. It was then inactivated 16 November 1987 in Germany and relieved from assignment to the 1st Armored Division. It was re-designated 2 October 1988 as Headquarters and Headquarters Company, 1st Battalion, 10th Aviation and its headquarters concurrently transferred to the United States Army Training and Doctrine Command and activated at Fort Rucker, Alabama. The Headquarters was withdrawn 5 January 1996 from the United States Army Training and Doctrine Command and inactivated at Fort Rucker, Alabama. It was then assigned 16 March 1996 to the 10th Mountain Division and activated at Fort Drum, New York (organic elements concurrently constituted and activated). The battalion was relieved 19 September 2005 from its assignment to the 10th Mountain Division and assigned to the 10th Combat Aviation Brigade, 10th Mountain Division. It was re-designated 1 October 2005 as the 1st Battalion, 10th Aviation Regiment, inactivated 15 October 2006 at Fort Drum, New York and then reactivated 15 June 2008 at Hunter Army Airfield, Georgia. Following its reactivation, the battalion deployed to Iraq in support of Operation Iraqi Freedom under the 10th Combat Aviation Brigade in October 2008. After redeploying back to the U.S., the unit was reassigned to the 10th Combat Aviation Brigade and transferred back to Fort Drum in October 2009. After transferring back to Fort Drum, the battalion, along with the rest of the 10th CAB, was restructured into a task force for an upcoming deployment to Afghanistan in 2010 in command of Major General Townsend, Colonel Francis, Lieutenant Colonel Ward, and Command Sergeant Major Paul.

Campaign Participation credit:

Vietnam	Vietnam	Operation Iraqi Freedom	Operation Enduring Freedom
Defense	Tet 69/Counteroffensive	National Resolution	Consolidation III
Counteroffensive	Summer-Fall 1969	Iraqi Surge	Transition I
Counteroffensive, Phase II	Winter-Spring 1970	Iraqi Sovereignty	
Counteroffensive, Phase III	Sanctuary Counteroffensive		
Tet Counteroffensive	Counteroffensive, Phase VII		
Counteroffensive, Phase IV	Consolidation I		
Counteroffensive, Phase V	Consolidation II		
Counteroffensive, Phase VI			

10th Aviation Regiment decorations:

- Valorous Unit Award for TUY HOA VALLEY
- Valorous Unit Award for DAK TO
- Meritorious Unit Commendation (Army) for VIETNAM 1965–1966
- Meritorious Unit Commendation (Army) for VIETNAM 1966–1967

1st Battalion, 10th Aviation Regiment decorations:

- Meritorious Unit Commendation (Army), Streamer embroidered IRAQ 2005–2006
- Meritorious Unit Commendation (Army), Streamer embroidered IRAQ 2008–2009

Company C additionally entitled to:

- Meritorious Unit Commendation (Army), Streamer embroidered IRAQ 2003–2004

== 2nd Aviation Battalion (Assault) ==
Mission

Our mission is to maintain an aviation brigade, trained and ready to deploy anywhere in the world to conduct combat, combat support and combat service support aviation operations to enable the 10th Mountain Division (LI) to fight and win!

History

The 10th Aviation was constituted on 21 Sept. 1965, in the Regular Army as Headquarters and Headquarters Detachment, 10th Aviation Battalion. The unit activated on 23 Aug. 1965, at Fort Benning, Georgia, and it was redesignated as Headquarters and Headquarters Company, 10th Aviation Battalion, on 1 Dec. 1968.

The 10th Aviation was an important contributor to the U.S. Army's efforts in Vietnam. The unit provided critical aviation support in the first Tet counter-offensive, and it distinguished itself by successfully fulfilling this vital role. The 10th Aviation regularly repeated this standard for success in the intervening years and was recognized for valorous acts at Dak To and Tuy Hoa, receiving Commendations (Army) and five awards for gallantry from the Republic of South Vietnam. The 10th Aviation was inactivated 30 Dec. 1980, at Fort Lewis, Washington.

On 2 July 1988, the 10th Aviation Brigade was reactivated at Griffiss Air Force Base in Rome, New York, as part of the 10th Mountain Division (Light Infantry); it relocated to Fort Drum, New York, in 1990. Since then, it has played a key role in all division missions, to include support for Hurricane Andrew Relief in south Florida, Operations Restore Hope and Continue Hope in Somalia, Operation Uphold Democracy in Haiti, SFOR and KFOR missions in Bosnia and Kosovo, and most recently, Operation Iraqi Freedom in Iraq and Operation Enduring Freedom in Afghanistan. In each instance, the brigade demonstrated its capability to rapidly deploy and conduct aviation missions upon arrival while emphasizing safety and readiness.

In July 2003, the 10th Aviation Brigade Headquarters deployed to Bagram Airfield, and 2nd Battalion, 10th Aviation Regiment, deployed to Kandahar Airfield in support of Operation Enduring Freedom (OEF) IV. While deployed, 10th Aviation Brigade assumed command of Task Force Panther, Task Force Talon, and Task Force Red Dawg (U.S. Marine Corps), and the brigade was renamed Combined Joint Task Force Falcon.

In January 2006, the 10th Aviation Brigade Headquarters, along with the newly formed 3rd General Support Aviation Battalion, 10th Aviation Regiment, and 277th Aviation Support Battalion, deployed to Bagram, with 2-10 Aviation again deploying to Kandahar, this time with a slice of 277th ASB. Upon completion of their mission in support of OEF VII, the units returned to Fort Drum.

In October 2008, the 10th CAB Headquarters, along with 1-10 Aviation, 2-10 Aviation, 3-10 Aviation and 277th ASB, deployed to Contingency Operating Base Speicher, while 6th Squadron, 6th Cavalry Regiment, deployed to Mosul in support of Operation Iraqi Freedom VIII.

In October 2010, the 10th CAB Headquarters, along with Task Force Phoenix (3-10 Aviation), and Task Force Mountain Eagle (277th ASB) deployed to Bagram Airfield, while Task Force Knighthawk (2-10 Aviation) deployed to Forward Operating Base Shank, Task Force Tigershark (1-10 Aviation) deployed to Salerno, and Task Force Six Shooters (6-6 Cavalry) deployed to Jalalabad Airfield to support Operation Enduring Freedom XI.

In February 2012, the 10th CAB Headquarters, along with TF Phoenix (3-10 Aviation) deployed to Bagram Airfield, while TF Knighthawk (2-10 Aviation) deployed to FOB Shank, and TF Tigershark (1-10 Aviation) deployed to Salerno in support of Operation Enduring Freedom XIV.

In February 2013, the brigade successfully deployed to Afghanistan in support of Operation Enduring Freedom.

In February 2015, D/10 "Gray Eagle" Company deployed to Afghanistan in support of Operation Freedom's Sentinel.

In October 2015, 6th Squadron, 6th Cavalry Regiment, deployed to South Korea with their OH-58D Kiowa helicopters. After their return from the rotation, the airframe was retired in July 2016, and 6-6 Cavalry transitioned into a heavy attack reconnaissance squadron (HARS) flying AH-64D Apache helicopters and RQ-7 Shadow unmanned aerial vehicles.

In March 2016, Soldiers of 1st Attack Reconnaissance Battalion, 10th Aviation Regiment, deployed to Iraq and Kuwait in an advisory role as part of Operation Inherent Resolve and Operation Spartan Shield.

In January 2017, D/10 "Gray Eagle" Company deployed to Iraq and Kuwait in support of both Operation Spartan Shield and Operation Inherent Resolve.

In February 2017, Soldiers of 10th CAB, augmented by 1-501st Attack Reconnaissance Battalion, 1st Combat Aviation Brigade, deployed across Europe in support of NATO and Atlantic Resolve 2.0.

In September 2017, 6-6 Cavalry returned to South Korea for a nine-month rotation to augment 2nd Combat Aviation Brigade, this time as an H-ARB.

Today, the 10th Combat Aviation Brigade stands ready to deploy in support of contingency operations worldwide.

Subordinate units:

Headquarters and Headquarters Company (Renegades)

1st Attack Reconnaissance Battalion, 10th Aviation Regiment (Dragons)

2nd Assault Helicopter Battalion, 10th Aviation Regiment (Knighthawks)

3rd General Support Aviation Battalion, 10th Aviation Regiment (Phoenix)

6th Squadron, 6th Cavalry Regiment (Six Shooters)

277 Aviation Support Battalion (Eagles)

== 3rd Battalion (General Support) ==
3rd Battalion, 10th Aviation is an active duty aviation battalion serving under the United States' 10th Mountain Division (Light Infantry). It is tasked with general support as part of the 10th Combat Aviation Brigade. The unit has deployed three times in support of the ongoing global war on terrorism.

The 3rd Battalion, 10th Aviation Regiment was first constituted on 16 September 2005, and designated Headquarters and Headquarters Company (HHC), 3rd Battalion, 10th Aviation Regiment, with its organic elements concurrently constituted and activated. On 19 September 2005, the unit was relieved of its assignment to the 10th Mountain Division (LI), and was reassigned to the 10th Combat Aviation Brigade (CAB), 10th Mountain Division (LI). Re-designated the 3rd General Support Aviation Battalion (GSAB), 10th Aviation Regiment on 1 October 2005, the "Phoenix Battalion" continues to conduct full-spectrum aviation operations as a component of either the 10th Mountain Division (LI), or any other assigned parent unit due to the needs of today's modular Army.

The battalion served in Operation Enduring Freedom VII (Afghanistan) from February, 2006, to February, 2007, where it conducted personnel transportation, re-supply, and air assault missions under the 10th Mountain Division (LI) in support of ongoing ISAF operations in the region. The battalion also provided aircraft for then-ongoing relief operations after the 2005 Kashmir earthquake that devastated much of northeastern Pakistan.

After nearly 18 months of stateside reprieve, the battalion was once again deployed, where it served in Operation Iraqi Freedom 08-10 (Iraq) from November, 2008, to November, 2009. The battalion once again performed personnel movement, re-supply, and air assault missions (though this time under the 25th Infantry Division (L)) throughout its area of operations. In January 2010, the battalion comprised a Headquarters and Headquarters Company (Staff/Personnel/Security/Operations/Supply/Communications), A Company (VIP/Personnel Movement), B Company (Heavy Lift), C Company (MEDEVAC), D Company (Aviation Maintenance), E Company (Aviation Refuel/Ground Maintenance), and F Company (Air Traffic Control).

Following the battalion's return from Iraq in 2009, the unit was restructured as task force's, TF Knighthawk, TF Phoenix, and TF Falcon, supplementing its own elements with elements from 2-10 Assault, 6-6 Cavalry, and 1-10 Attack. 6-6 CAV integrated with C 1-10 ATK Blue Max, combining into one dual-airframe flight company, the only one like it in the Army. It consisted of 6 OH-58D and 6 AH-64D helicopters. During the battalion's 12-month dwell time, the unit received and trained up on new "Foxtrot" model Chinooks, as well as multi-platform mission execution and performed a training rotation in Fort Carson, Colorado in preparation for an upcoming deployment to Afghanistan. In August 2010, the unit began deploying forces from C Company MEDEVAC to Afghanistan, with the rest of the battalion following suit in October 2010. The task force returned from Afghanistan in October 2011, where it began receiving and train up on the new "Mike" model Blackhawk helicopter as well as preparation for another deployment to Afghanistan in 2013.

After Hurricane Sandy's landfall, the unit sent a group of UH-60L, UH-60M, HH-60M and CH-47F helicopters to Bedford, Massachusetts to assist in operations to assess damages, and to provide relief.

The battalion's equipment includes the UH-60 "Blackhawk", and the CH-47

10th Aviation Regiment decorations:

Decorations

Valorous Unit Award, Streamer embroidered TUY HOA VALLEY
Valorous Unit Award, Streamer embroidered DAK TO
Meritorious Unit Commendation (Army), Streamer embroidered VIETNAM 1965–1966
Meritorious Unit Commendation (Army), Streamer embroidered VIETNAM 1966–1967

Campaign Participation Credit
Vietnam

Defense
Counteroffensive
Counteroffensive, Phase II
Counteroffensive, Phase III
Tet Counteroffensive
Counteroffensive, Phase IV
Counteroffensive, Phase V
Counteroffensive, Phase VI
Tet 69/Counteroffensive
Summer-Fall 1969
Winter-Spring 1970
Sanctuary Counteroffensive
Counteroffensive, Phase VII
Consolidation I
Consolidation II

War on terrorism

Afghanistan 2006–2007
Iraq 2008–2009
