= 7th Field Artillery Regiment =

7th Field Artillery
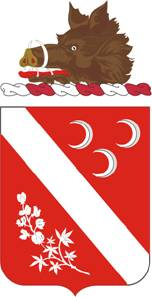
- Coat of arms
- Active: 1916 –
- Country: USA
- Branch: Army
- Type: Field artillery
- Nickname: First Lightning
- Motto: Never Broken
- Engagements: World War I World War II; Vietnam War; Afghanistan Campaign; Iraq Campaign

Insignia
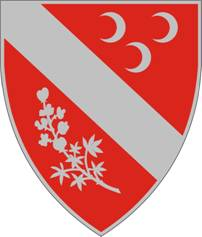
- Distinctive unit insignia

The 7th Field Artillery Regiment is a United States Army field artillery regiment, whose lineage traces back to the early 20th century.

Note that the lineage of the "7th Regiment of Artillery" constituted 8 March 1898 is carried by the 7th Air Defense Artillery Regiment.

== World War I ==
The regiment was constituted on 1 July 1916 in the Regular Army as the 7th Field Artillery. It was organized on 15 July 1916 at Fort Sam Houston, Texas. On 8 June 1917 it was assigned to the First Expeditionary Division, which was later designated as the 1st Division as part of the Allied Expeditionary Force in World War I.

== World War II ==
7th Field Artillery Regiment participated in the amphibious assault landing in Algeria as part of Operation Torch. After fighting across North Africa, the regiment participated Operation Husky landing in Gela. The regiment then went to England to train and join the 1st Infantry Division's assault of Omaha Beach at Collevillle—surMer supporting the 16th Infantry. The regiment fought across Europe to the Hurtgen Forest in Germany, participating in the Battle of the Bulge.

== Vietnam War ==
On 20 January 1964 the unit was redesignated the 1st Battalion, 7th Artillery and assigned to the 1st Infantry Division. The distinctive unit insignia (DUI) of the unit was changed to an "artillery red" square shield with a silver band dividing it (as seen by the wearer) from the top right corner to the bottom left corner. In the upper division of the shield appears three silver crescent moons, while the lower division holds seven silver crosslets alluding to the numerical designation of the battalion. The primary charge of the shield however is the three large "artillery red" arrow heads or pheons that rest upon the silver band. It is from these three pheons that the nickname for the battalion "the Pheons" is derived. The unit's motto was shortened to "Nunquam Fractum" (Never Broken) written in silver on an "artillery red" scroll beneath the shield.

The unit would carry this designation throughout its tour of Vietnam from 25 June 1965, to 19 March 1970. On 23 June 1965, Private First Class Gerold Worster arrived by plane in Saigon, in the Republic of Vietnam. Not only was Gerold the first soldier from the 1st Infantry Division, known as the "Big Red One", he was also the first member of the 7th Artillery to set foot on Vietnamese soil. Even as he climbed from the plane, his comrades were loading aboard the USNS General W. H. Gordon for the trip to Vietnam. On 12 July, Charlie Battery of the 1st Battalion, 7th Artillery made landfall at Cam Ranh Bay, part of a taskforce with the 1st Battalion, 18th Infantry, 1st Infantry Division.

After returning from Vietnam in March 1970, the 7th Artillery was redesignated the 7th Field Artillery once again on 1 September 1971. The unit insignia was redesigned by replacing the squared shield with a more rounded one, eliminating the three pheons on the bend of the shield, and replacing the seven crosslets with seven blossoms of the Texas bluebonnet, alluding not only to the unit's number, but its birthplace as well. The motto "Nunquam Fractum" was replaced with "Nunquam Aerumna Nec Proelio Fractum" (never broken by hardship or battle).

During its Vietnam tour the 105 mm howitzers of the 1st Battalion, 7th Artillery, fired more than 1,250,000 rounds in its 55 continuous months of combat while earning 11 new battle honors. With the change of the unit insignia and the loss of the pheons from the shield, the 7th Artillery's Vietnam nickname of "Pheons" was also lost.

Vietnam Campaign Participation: *Defense; *Counteroffensive; *Counteroffensive, Phase II; *Counteroffensive, Phase III; *Tet Counteroffensive; *Counteroffensive, Phase IV; *Counteroffensive, Phase V; *Counteroffensive, Phase VI; *Tet 69/Counteroffensive; *Summer-Fall 1969; *Winter-Spring 1970Decorations: *Meritorious Unit Commendation (Army) for VIETNAM 1966–1967, *Meritorious Unit Commendation (Army) for VIETNAM 1967–1968, *Republic of Vietnam Cross of Gallantry with Palm for VIETNAM 1965–1968, *Republic of Vietnam Cross of Gallantry with Palm for VIETNAM 1969–1970, *Republic of Vietnam Civil Action Honor Medal, First Class for VIETNAM 1965–1970.

== Kuwait 1990–91 ==
The artillery battery elements of the 7th FA unit located in Fort Drum, New York, volunteered approximately 60 soldiers at a time to participate in a rotation schedule during Operation Desert Shield / Operation Desert Storm in late 1990 and early 1991. Although the unit itself was not activated for combat duty as a whole, these soldiers rotated out over a nine-month period to support the 82nd Airborne Division and 101st Airborne Divisions.

== Afghanistan ==
A Soldier from 3rd Battalion, 7th Field Artillery, practices firing a grenade launcher near Kandahar Airfield, Afghanistan, Sept. 17, 2004

The 3rd Battalion, 7th Field Artillery 3rd Brigade Combat Team, 25th (Light) Infantry Division, was in Afghanistan as part of Joint Task Force 76 in Operation Enduring Freedom 2004–2005. The unit was headquartered at Kandahar Airfield and provided indirect fire, close combat air control, and fire support for the Bronco Brigade and throughout Afghanistan during the 12-month rotation. The battalion, augmented by coalition partners, was responsible for Kandahar Province and conducted infantry missions during the deployment, conducting patrols in the districts surrounding the city of Kandahar. During this deployment, Bravo Battery (Bulls) was recorded as having shot the first artillery round against a hostile enemy for the 25th (L)ID since Vietnam.

== Iraq ==
1st Battalion, 7th Field Artillery Regiment was relieved from assignment to the 25th Infantry Division and assigned to the 2nd Brigade Combat Team, 1st Infantry Division on 16 November 2005.

In October 2010 1st Battalion 7th Field Artillery Regiment deployed in support of Operation New Dawn in Iraq at JSS Loyalty. They partnered with and trained the 1st Iraqi Federal Police against Iranian backed militias in the area. They returned in October 2011 after a 12-month deployment to Fort Riley, KS.

== Current status ==
The 3rd Battalion, 7th Field Artillery Regiment returned to Schofield Barracks, HI in October 2009 where they were awarded the Valorous Unit Commendation. Currently, they are conducting reset operations and training to prepare for future deployments.

In October 2015, 1-7 FA was reassigned to 1st Infantry Division's newly reconstituted "DIVARTY," part of an Army-wide reorganization of the modular brigade concept. In the fall of 2015, the battalion deployed to Kuwait in support of Operation Spartan Shield and Iraq in support of Operation Inherent Resolve until June 2016. All three firing batteries engaged ISIS fighters in Anbar Province from fire bases in Ramadi and Al Asad. Elements of Charlie Battery deployed to northern Iraq in support of the Iraqi Army's eventual push to Mosul.

== Honors ==
=== Campaign participation credit ===
- World War I:
1. Montdidier-Noyon;
2. Aisne-Marne;
3. St. Mihiel;
4. Meuse-Argonne;
5. Lorraine 1917;
6. Lorraine 1918;
7. Picardy 1918
- World War II:
1. Algeria-French Morocco (with arrowhead);
2. Tunisia;
3. Sicily (with arrowhead);
4. Normandy (with arrowhead);
5. Northern France
6. Rhineland
7. Ardennes-Alsace
8. Central Europe
- Vietnam:
1. Defense;
2. Counteroffensive;
3. Counteroffensive, Phase II;
4. Counteroffensive, Phase III;
5. Tet Counteroffensive;
6. Counteroffensive, Phase IV;
7. Counteroffensive, Phase V;
8. Counteroffensive, Phase VI;
9. Tet 69/Counteroffensive;
10. Summer-Fall 1969;
11. Winter-Spring 1970

=== Decorations ===
- Meritorious Unit Commendation (Army) for VIETNAM 1966–1967
- Meritorious Unit Commendation (Army) for VIETNAM 1967–1968
- French Croix de Guerre with Palm, World War I for LORRAINE-PICARDY
- French Croix de Guerre with Palm, World War I for AISNE-MARNE and MEUSE-ARGONNE
- French Croix de Guerre with Palm, World War II for KASSERINE
- French Croix de Guerre with Palm, World War II for NORMANDY
- French Médaille militaire, Fourragère
- Belgian Fourragère 1940: Cited in the Order of the Day of the Belgian Army for action at MONS and for action at EUPEN-MALMEDY
- Republic of Vietnam Cross of Gallantry with Palm, Streamer embroidered VIETNAM 1965–1968
- Republic of Vietnam Cross of Gallantry with Palm, Streamer embroidered VIETNAM 1969–1970
- Republic of Vietnam Civil Action Honor Medal, First Class, Streamer embroidered VIETNAM 1965–1970
- Army Superior Unit Award for Operation Joint Endeavor/Joint Guard 1996–1997

=== 1st Battalion ===
Operation Iraqi Freedom

- Valorous Unit Commendation

=== 3rd Battalion ===
Operation Enduring Freedom

- Meritorious Unit Commendation

== See also ==
- 7th Air Defense Artillery Regiment - had shared lineage 1 September 1958 – 1 September 1971
