= Netherlands American Cemetery =

ABMC World War II cemetery in the Netherlands

Netherlands American Cemetery and Memorial
- American Battle Monuments Commission
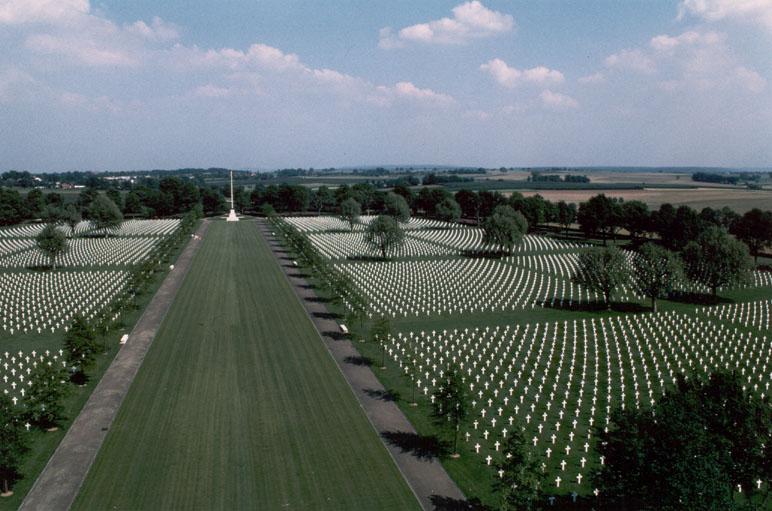
- Netherlands American Cemetery
- Used for those deceased 1941–1945
- Location: 50°49′N 5°48′E near Margraten, Netherlands
- Total burials: More than 8,000, see note 1

Burials by nation
- United States: More than 8,000, see note 1

Burials by war
- World War II: More than 8,000, see note 1

Netherlands American Cemetery and Memorial (Dutch: Amerikaanse Begraafplaats Margraten) is a Second World War military war grave cemetery, located in the village of Margraten, 10 km (6.2 mi) east of Maastricht, in the most southern part of the Netherlands. The cemetery, the only American one in the Netherlands and dedicated in 1960, contains a constantly varying number above 8,000 American war dead and covers 26.5 hectares (65 acres). It is administered by the American Battle Monuments Commission (ABMC).

== History ==
The cemetery was created in November 1944 under the leadership of Lt. Col. Joseph Shomon of the 611th Graves Registration Company, as the Ninth United States Army pushed into the Netherlands from France and Belgium. As the war was coming to an end, it was expected that the cemetery would have to be built twice in the following years: first to accommodate what would become more than 20,000 dead of the last months of the conflict, including enemy dead, then to what would become a reduced population of 8,000 as other permanent cemeteries were opened, bodies were returned to America at the wish of American families, and enemy dead were moved to their home countries. At the outset, it was determined that the cemetery would congregate war dead within 600 km of Margraten with the goal that no Americans would remain buried in enemy territory.

With cooperation of the leadership of the village of Margraten, the cemetery was plotted out in prime agricultural land for which farmers would eventually receive compensation. It would eventually comprise 65 acres on an historic former Roman highway that had carried the growth of Europe and movements of war since the Early Middle Ages. In the 21st century, the road is a mostly rural artery between Maastricht, Netherlands and Aachen, Germany (N278 becoming German1).

The first ground in the cemetery was broken with the labor of the largely African American 960th Quartermaster Corps at the outset of what would be a historically cold and wet winter. The workers used picks and shovels to create a standard grave that was 6 feet deep, 6 feet long and 2½ feet wide. After processing, the body was to be placed in a mattress cover with its dog tag in its mouth. The first 300 dead were buried during Thanksgiving 1944. As the winter went on the process was complicated by frozen remains, the constant flooding of graves before they could be filled, and the inability of transport and machinery to maintain reliable solid ground.

Spring 1945 brought relief to the effort involved but a dramatic and accelerated number of those to be buried. As the number of dead increased with the nearby Battle of the Bulge and other conflicts it became necessary for the U.S. military to ask the people of Margraten for help. The response of the village initiated a full relationship between south Limburg Province of the Netherlands and the American cemetery that remained active into the 21st century. The cemetery was ceremonially opened on Memorial Day 1946 as an event of international attention and with the attendance of twenty trucks full with flowers from sixty surrounding villages. The final phase of the cemetery's development, in 1949, required the disinterment of most burials for return home or movement to other cemeteries, redesign and reinternment for the creation of the modern Netherlands American Cemetery of the American Battle Monuments Commission.

Nearly all US personnel were concentrated at the cemetery with the exception of some burials at Zoetermeer (pilot John E. McCormick), Loosdrecht (Jasper Vandenbergh killed in action 16 December 1944 at St. Vith - originally interred at Henri-Chappelle but moved to Loosdrecht cemetery at the request of his parents who both came from the town) and Opijnen (eight of the crew of B-17 Man-O-War shot down over Opijnen on 30 July 1943).

Over 3,000 Germans that had been buried in a field adjacent to the American one were reburied at Ysselsteyn German war cemetery. The bodies of Soviet prisoners of war were moved to Rusthof cemetery, Amersfoort. Additionally, a thousand Commonwealth soldiers, mainly British and Canadian, were also moved to cemeteries elsewhere post war.

The cemetery was dedicated in 1960 and officially opened by Queen Juliana of the Netherlands.

== Architecture and layout ==
The cemetery covers 26.5 hectares (65.5 acres) and from the entrance there is Court of Honor with a reflecting pool. There is a visitors' building and a museum with three engraved operations maps designed by Yale University graduate Lewis York (who is buried in Akron, Ohio) and executed by the Dura Company of Heerlen, Netherlands, describing the movements of the American forces in the area during World War II. At the base of the chapel tower, facing the reflecting pool, is a statue by Joseph Kiselewski representing the grieving mother for her lost son.

The walls on either side of the Court of Honor contain the Tablets of the Missing on which are recorded the names of 1,722 American missing service personnel; rosettes placed next to a name denote that the person has since been identified. Beyond the chapel and tower is the burial area which is divided into sixteen plots. An approximate and regularly changing number (due to identification and other factors) of just more than 8,000 American dead, most of whom fell in nearby battles, are interred in the cemetery with headstones set in long curves.

== Commemorations and displays ==
In the demands of the end of World War II, the relationship between the Margraten community of south Limburg and the American military community involved in the construction, deconstruction and reconstruction of The Netherlands American Cemetery has led to the attention to those buried in the cemetery on the part of the surrounding community. In 1945, an official of the village suggested that each of the graves and memorial names be adopted by families and individuals, and each has remained adopted into the 21st century. Many adoptions by citizens of the Netherlands and Belgium are passed down through family generations, and in 2021 there was a waiting list of those who wished to take up lapsed adoptions. The adoption program, which exists in various forms for most of the American cemeteries in Europe is administered by The Foundation for Adopting Graves American Cemetery Margraten.

Each year, on the Dutch Memorial Day, commemorations take place in the cemetery. In 2005, President George W. Bush became the first American president to visit the cemetery. The following quote is from a speech President Bush gave that day:

On this peaceful May morning we commemorate a great victory for liberty, and the thousands of white marble crosses and Stars of David underscore the terrible price we pay for that victory. For the Americans who rest here, Dutch soil provides a fitting home. It was from a Dutch port that many of our pilgrim fathers first sailed for America. It was a Dutch port that gave the American flag its first gun salute. It was the Dutch who became one of the first foreign nations to recognize the independence of the new United States of America. And when American soldiers returned to this continent to fight for freedom, they were led by a President (Roosevelt) who owed his family name to this great land.

In 2008, the Legacy of the War Heritage Program of the Dutch government and the Association of Margraten Local History Organizations supported an oral history project, Akkers van Margraten (Fields of Margraten), with a resulting book, From Farmland to Soldiers Field and the television documentary Akkers van Margraten.

In 2009, an international gathering in honor of the cemetery and the 65th anniversary of the liberation of the Netherlands brought the first sergeant of the African American gravediggers of 1944, retired Connecticut educator Jefferson Wiggins, to speak at a community celebration in Maastricht, excerpted:

War affects all of us and it occurs to me that we all have a role to play in a conflict of the magnitude of World War II. The people of the Netherlands - especially those in Margraten and Maastricht - know this all too well. When the dead were buried, we, as soldiers, went on to other duties and we finally went home. But the twenty thousand [in 1945] who were buried in the Netherlands remained. Who was it that took on the responsibility of managing such a huge cemetery? Who took on the task of remembering those who had given their lives to a cause that was intended to give us all our freedom? The people of the Netherlands took on that task. So I believe we owe a debt of gratitude, especially to the people of the Margraten area who, each year place flowers on these graves. In doing so, they say, in effect, "Thank you. We remember you and we honor you." And I say, to these gallant people who care for these graves, "Thank you. We respect you and we honor you."

In 2014, The Faces of Margraten project opened an effort to gather photographs of each of those buried for display on alternate Memorial Days, and had assembled a library of 7,500 by 2020. In 2018, attention turned to 172 African American soldiers found to have been buried at Margraten and the role that they had played in the liberation and restoration of the Netherlands. With the Black Liberators project historians Mieke Kirkels and Sebastiaan Vonk have developed a project which seeks to learn more about them as part of the continuing effort by Netherlanders to honor those who are buried in its American war cemetery.

=== Black soldiers panels ===
In 2024, two panels related to African American participation in the war were installed, one of which noted the million African Americans who enlisted but were “fighting on two fronts", both against the Nazis in Europe and against America's segregationist policies. In its final section, the panel linked African American wartime service to President Harry S. Truman's 1948 order to desegregate the armed forces and to the later civil rights movement. In November 2025 Dutch historians, politicians, and citizens raised alarm when the panels were found to have been removed. The removal formed part of a wider wave of changes prompted by the Trump administration's campaign to eliminate diversity, equality and inclusion (DEI) language and programs in federal institutions. Although the Margraten cemetery was not directly covered by those orders, ABMC officials removed the panels because they feared they might conflict with the administration's anti‑DEI policy. A formal request was made to the provincial government by 11 local parties, expressing their “shock”, and proposing a separate permanent site to remember the soldiers. “Removing the panels that commemorate the sacrifices of black American soldiers does not do justice to history and is improper and unacceptable,” they said. The ABMC responded that, of the two panels, one had been permanently removed and the other was currently off display but not out of rotation. Trump Administration US Ambassador to the Netherlands Joe Popolo supported the removal, meanwhile, accusing the panels of promoting "an agenda that criticizes America". According to the American Battle Monuments Commission, the exhibition at Margraten included three biographical panels on individual Black soldiers, George H. Pruitt, Willmore Mack, and Willy F. James Jr., which were designed to be rotated periodically.

== Notable burials ==
- Lt. Col. Robert G. Cole, United States Army – Medal of Honor
- Pfc. Willy F. James Jr., United States Army – Medal of Honor
- Pvt. George J. Peters, United States Army – Medal of Honor
- S/Sgt. George Peterson, United States Army – Medal of Honor
- Maj. Gen. Maurice Rose, United States Army – Highest ranking soldier killed by enemy fire in the European Theater
- 1st Lt. Charles Steele von Stade, United States Army – U.S Open Polo Champion
- Pfc. Walter C. Wetzel, United States Army – Medal of Honor
- 1st Lt. Walter J. Will, United States Army – Medal of Honor

== See also ==
- World War II memorials and cemeteries in the Netherlands
- Lamp of Brotherhood – Decorative oil lamp as a symbol of reconciliation
