= Walter C. Wetzel =

United States Army Medal of Honor recipient (1919–1945)

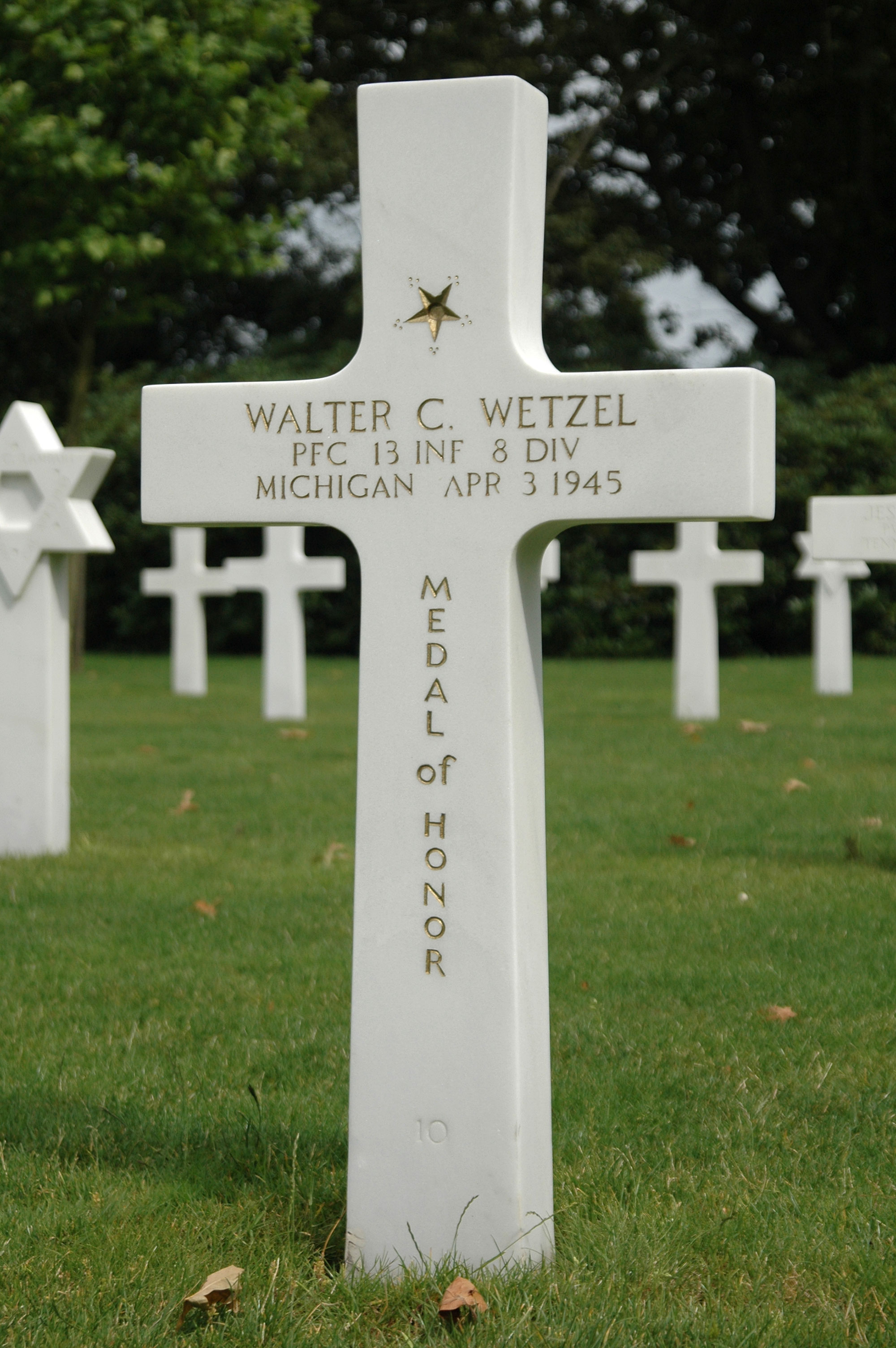
- Grave at Netherlands American Cemetery
- Born: June 7, 1919; Huntington, West Virginia, US
- Died: April 3, 1945 (aged 25) near Morsbach, Germany
- Burial place: Netherlands American Cemetery, Margraten, the Netherlands
- Military career
- Allegiance: United States
- Branch: United States Army
- Service years: 1941–1945
- Rank: Private First Class
- Units: 13th Infantry Regiment, 8th Infantry Division
- Conflicts: World War II: West European Campaign (1944-1945)
- Awards: Medal of Honor

Walter C. Wetzel (June 7, 1919 – April 3, 1945) was a United States Army soldier and a recipient of the United States military's highest decoration—the Medal of Honor—for his actions in World War II.

== Biography ==
Wetzel joined the Army from Roseville, Michigan in July 1941, and by April 3, 1945, was serving as a private first class in the 13th Infantry Regiment, 8th Infantry Division. On that day, in Birken, Germany, Wetzel smothered the blasts of German-thrown grenades with his body, sacrificing himself to protect those around him. He was posthumously awarded the Medal of Honor ten months later, on February 26, 1946, by President Harry S. Truman.

Wetzel is buried in the Netherlands American Cemetery, Margraten, the Netherlands.

== Medal of Honor citation ==
Private First Class Wetzel's official Medal of Honor citation reads:

Pfc. Wetzel, an acting squad leader with the Antitank Company of the 13th Infantry, was guarding his platoon's command post in a house at Birken, Germany, during the early morning hours of 3 April 1945, when he detected strong enemy forces moving in to attack. He ran into the house, alerted the occupants and immediately began defending the post against heavy automatic weapons fire coming from the hostile troops. Under cover of darkness the Germans forced their way close to the building where they hurled grenades, 2 of which landed in the room where Pfc. Wetzel and the others had taken up firing positions. Shouting a warning to his fellow soldiers, Pfc. Wetzel threw himself on the grenades and, as they exploded, absorbed their entire blast, suffering wounds from which he died. The supreme gallantry of Pfc. Wetzel saved his comrades from death or serious injury and made it possible for them to continue the defense of the command post and break the power of a dangerous local counterthrust by the enemy. His unhesitating sacrifice of his life was in keeping with the U.S. Army's highest traditions of bravery and heroism.

== See also ==
- List of Medal of Honor recipients
- List of Medal of Honor recipients for World War II
