= George Peterson (Medal of Honor) =

United States Army Medal of Honor recipient

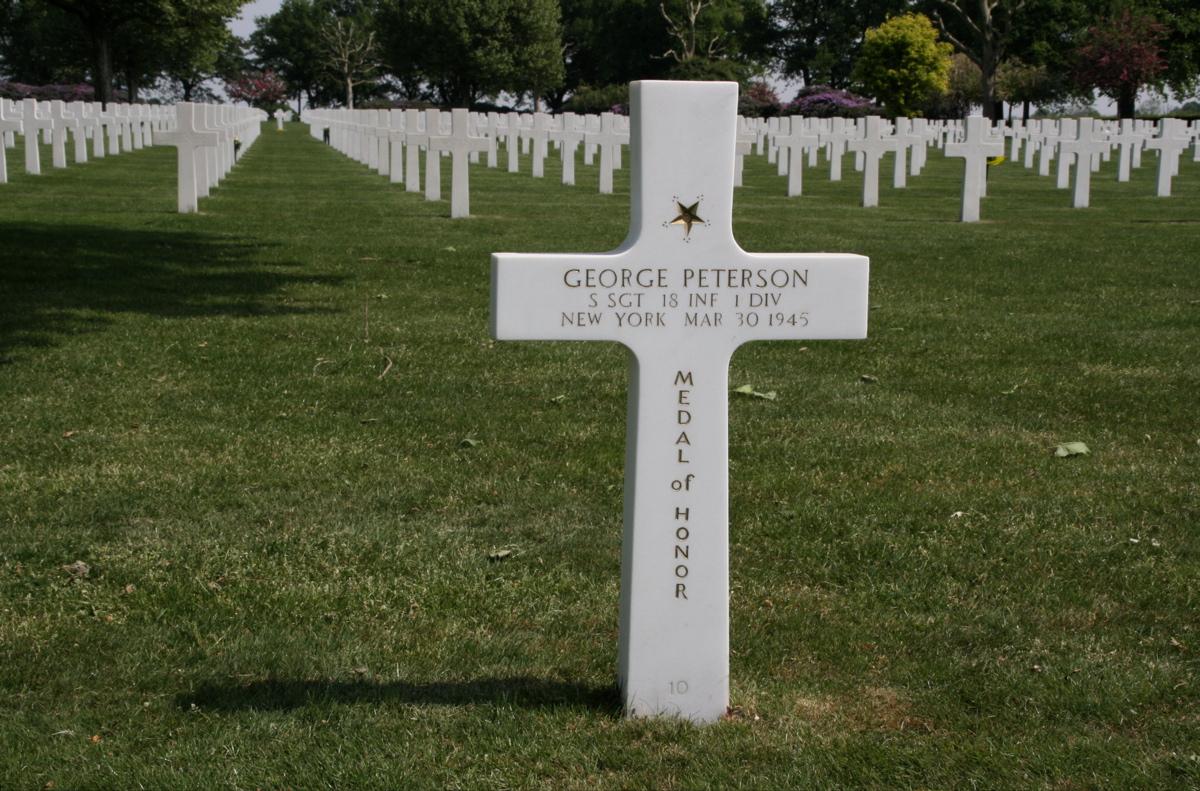
- Peterson's grave marker at the Netherlands American Cemetery
- Born: May 28, 1912; Brooklyn, New York, U.S.
- Died: March 30, 1945 (aged 32) near Eisern, Germany
- Burial place: Netherlands American Cemetery, Margraten, Netherlands
- Military career
- Allegiance: United States of America
- Branch: United States Army
- Service years: 1933 - 1945
- Rank: Staff Sergeant
- Units: 18th Infantry Regiment, 1st Infantry Division
- Conflicts: World War II †
- Awards: Medal of Honor; Bronze Star (2); Purple Heart (4)

George Peterson (May 18, 1912 – March 30, 1945) was a United States Army soldier and a recipient of the United States military's highest decoration—the Medal of Honor—for his actions in World War II.

== Biography ==
George Peterson was born in Brooklyn, New York on May 28, 1912. He joined the Army from his birthplace in July 1933, and by March 30, 1945, was serving as a staff sergeant in Company K, 18th Infantry Regiment, 1st Infantry Division. During a battle on that day, near Eisern, Germany, Peterson was severely wounded but continued in the fight and single-handedly destroyed three German machinegun nests before receiving another, fatal, wound. He was posthumously awarded the Medal of Honor seven months later, on October 17, 1945.

== Medal of Honor ==
Staff Sergeant Peterson's official Medal of Honor citation reads:

He was an acting platoon sergeant with Company K, near Eisern, Germany. When his company encountered an enemy battalion and came under heavy small-arms, machinegun, and mortar fire, the 2d Platoon was given the mission of flanking the enemy positions while the remaining units attacked frontally. S/Sgt. Peterson crept and crawled to a position in the lead and motioned for the 2d Platoon to follow. A mortar shell fell close by and severely wounded him in the legs, but, although bleeding and suffering intense pain, he refused to withdraw and continued forward. Two hostile machineguns went into action at close range. Braving this grazing fire, he crawled steadily toward the guns and worked his way alone to a shallow draw, where, despite the hail of bullets, he raised himself to his knees and threw a grenade into the nearest machinegun nest, silencing the weapon and killing or wounding all its crew. The second gun was immediately turned on him, but he calmly and deliberately threw a second grenade which rocked the position and killed all 4 Germans who occupied it. As he continued forward he was spotted by an enemy rifleman, who shot him in the arm. Undeterred, he crawled some 20 yards until a third machinegun opened fire on him. By almost superhuman effort, weak from loss of blood and suffering great pain, he again raised himself to his knees and fired a grenade from his rifle, killing 3 of the enemy guncrew and causing the remaining one to flee. With the first objective seized, he was being treated by the company aid man when he observed 1 of his outpost men seriously wounded by a mortar burst. He wrenched himself from the hands of the aid man and began to crawl forward to assist his comrade, whom he had almost reached when he was struck and fatally wounded by an enemy bullet. S/Sgt. Peterson, by his gallant, intrepid actions, unrelenting fighting spirit, and outstanding initiative, silenced 3 enemy machineguns against great odds and while suffering from severe wounds, enabling his company to advance with minimum casualties.

== Awards and decorations ==

Badge	Combat Infantryman Badge		
1st row	Medal of Honor		Bronze Star Medal with 1 Oak leaf cluster
2nd row	Purple Heart with 3 Oak leaf clusters	Army Good Conduct Medal	American Defense Service Medal
3rd row	American Campaign Medal	European–African–Middle Eastern Campaign Medal with Arrowhead Device and 6 Campaign stars	World War II Victory Medal
Unit awards	Presidential Unit Citation with 2 Oak leaf clusters		

== See also ==
- List of Medal of Honor recipients
- List of Medal of Honor recipients for World War II
