= 18th Infantry Regiment (United States) =

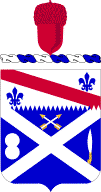
- Coat of arms
- Active: 1861–present
- Country: United States
- Branch: United States Army
- Type: Mechanized infantry
- Garrison/HQ: 1–18: Fort Riley, Kansas
- Nickname: "Vanguards" (special designation)
- Motto: "'Til the Last Round!"
- Engagements: American Civil War Indian Wars; Spanish–American War; Philippine–American War; World War I World War II: Algeria-French Morocco Campaign; Tunisia Campaign; Operation Husky; Operation Overlord; Northern France; Rhineland; Ardennes-Alsace; Western Allied invasion of Germany; Vietnam War; Gulf War; Iraq War War in Afghanistan

Commanders
- Notable commanders: Henry B. Carrington; Thomas H. Ruger; Captain William J. Fetterman; Henry W. Wessells; Ulysses G. McAlexander; John M. J. Sanno

Insignia
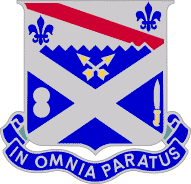
- Distinctive unit insignia

The 18th Infantry Regiment ("Vanguards") is an infantry regiment of the United States Army. The regiment currently exists with one active battalion, under the U.S. Army Regimental System; regimental designation is used only for historical tradition, and there is no active regimental headquarters. The 18th Infantry once had up to four active battalions, but three have been inactivated:

- The 1st Battalion, 18th Infantry Regiment's home duty station is located at Fort Riley, Kansas, with the 2d "Dagger" Brigade Combat Team, 1st Infantry Division. It is a combined arms battalion.
- The 2nd Battalion, 18th Infantry Regiment was stationed in Baumholder, Germany as part of the 170th Infantry Brigade Combat Team (Separate) and was inactivated with the brigade in 2012.
- The 3rd Battalion, 18th Infantry was stationed in Lawrence, Massachusetts, as part of the 187th Infantry Brigade, 94th Army Reserve Command (1963–1994).
- The 4th Battalion, 18th Infantry was part of the Berlin Brigade stationed in West Berlin in the 1960s along with the 2d and 3d Battalions, 6th Infantry. West Berlin was 100 miles behind the Iron Curtain in East Germany, surrounded by an estimated force of 270,000 Russian and East German troops. The battalion was later reflagged as the 4th Battalion, 6th Infantry.

== History ==
=== Civil War ===
The 18th Infantry was constituted in the Regular Army on 3 May 1861, and was organized at Camp Thomas, Ohio. It participated in campaigns in the Western theater of the American Civil War as a part of the US XIV Army Corps, under MG George Thomas, MG John M. Palmer and MG Jefferson C. Davis. Engagements included Perryville, Stones River, Chickamauga, Chattanooga, and the campaign for Atlanta. At Utoy Creek, Georgia, on 5 August 1864 as part of Johnsons 1st Division, XIV Army Corps under MG John M Palmer, the Regular Brigade" that included the 18th Infantry was cited for making a crossing of North Utoy Creek under fire, assaulting and driving Armstrong's Confederate Cavalry Brigade, dismounted from their position at Peyton Road. 15th and 18th U.S. Infantry were cited for this action in official records. It then conducted a feint assault on 6 August 1864 to support XXIII Corps' attack at Utoy Creek, and participated in the three-week siege of Atlanta along the high ground east of Utoy Creek in southwest Atlanta, near Willis Mill and Adams Park (near current Fort McPherson).

=== Indian Wars ===
- Fetterman Massacre. On 21 December 1866, CPT William J. Fetterman took command of a composite force consisting of the former battalion quartermaster, Captain Frederick Brown, 2nd Lt. George Grummond, 49 enlisted troops of the 18th Infantry, 27 men of the 2nd Cavalry Regiment, and 2 civilian scouts. Ignoring his orders not to venture beyond Lodge Trail Ridge (out of sight and support distance from the fort), Fetterman pursued a small band of Sioux and was lured into an ambush. He found himself facing approximately 2,000 Indians. Within 20 minutes, Fetterman and his command had been wiped out.

=== Interwar period ===
The 18th Infantry arrived at the port of New York on 3 September 1919 on the troopship USS Mobile, and was transferred to Camp Merritt, New Jersey, where emergency period personnel were discharged from the service. The regiment participated in the 1st Division Victory Parades in New York City and Washington, D.C., on 10 and 17 September 1919, respectively. It was transferred on 4 October 1919 to Camp Zachary Taylor, Kentucky, and was transferred on 14 September 1920 to Camp Dix, New Jersey. The regimental headquarters was transferred on 10 September 1922 to Fort Slocum, New York, with the subordinate battalions concurrently transferred as follows: 1st Battalion to Fort Slocum; 2nd Battalion to Fort Schuyler, New York; and 3rd Battalion to Fort Hamilton, New York. The regiment was organized with elements of the 16th Infantry into the “Composite Regiment” and deployed to Washington, D.C., to act as an honor guard for the unveiling of the 1st Division War Memorial on 4 October 1924.

The regimental headquarters was transferred on 10 January 1928 to Fort Hamilton, and concurrently, the 3rd Battalion was transferred to Fort Slocum. Company H was awarded the Edwin Howard Clark trophy for machine gun marksmanship in 1928 and 1929. The 2nd Battalion was transferred on 3 July 1931 to Fort Wadsworth, New York. Elements of the regiment served as honor guard for Marshal Henri Petain during his visit to New York City on 24 October 1931. In April 1933, the regiment assumed command and control of portions of the 1st Civilian Conservation Corps District (New Jersey), Second Corps Area. The 3rd Battalion was transferred in June 1933 to Fort Wadsworth. The regiment departed the New York Port of Embarkation on 28 October 1939 on the troopship USAT Republic and debarked at the port of Charleston, South Carolina, en route to Fort Benning, Georgia. After maneuvers in Louisiana in May 1940, the regiment returned to Fort Hamilton on 5 June 1940. It was transferred on 27 February 1941 to Fort Devens, Massachusetts.

=== World War II ===
- North African campaign. On 8 November 1942, the 18th Infantry Regiment (part of the 1st Infantry Division) went ashore at Oran, Algeria. Ensuring that the 18th was one of the first U.S. Army infantry units to engage in combat against Axis forces. The regiment (or elements of the regiment) would experience heavy action over the following seven months at Maktar, Tebourba, Medjez el Bab, the Battle of Kasserine Pass (where American forces were pushed back), and Gafsa. It also participated at El Guettar, Béja, and Mateur. The 18th Infantry Regiment was in combat in the Tunisian Campaign from 21 January 1943 to 9 May 1943, helping secure Tunisia for the Allies.
- Invasion of Sicily. The regiment participated in The Battle of Gela (10 - 12 July 1943) where it withstood heavy counterattacks from Italian and German forces. On 7 August 1943, the 18th Infantry Regiment captured Mount Pellegrino which overlooked the Troina defenses allowing accurate direction of Allied artillery.
- Invasion of Normandy. The 18th Infantry Regiment was part of the landing forces that participated in the initial onset of Operation Overlord. The 18th Regimental Combat Team (RCT) was part of the 1st Infantry Division forces that stormed Omaha Beach. The regiment was scheduled to land at 09:30 on Easy Red. The first battalion to land, 2/18, arrived at the E-1 draw 30 minutes late after a difficult passage through the congestion offshore. Casualties were light, though despite the existence of a narrow channel through the beach obstacles the ramps and mines there accounted for the loss 22 LCVP's, 2 LCI(L)'s and 4 LCT's. Supported by tank and subsequent naval fire, the newly arrived troops took the surrender of the last strong point defending the entrance to the E-1 draw at 11:30. Although a usable exit was finally opened, congestion prevented an early exploitation inland. The three battalions of the 115th RCT, scheduled to land from 10:30 on Dog Red and Easy Green came in together and on top of the 18th RCT landings at Easy Red. The confusion prevented the remaining two battalions of the 18th RCT from landing until 13:00 and delayed the move off the beach of all but 2/18, which had exited the beach further east before noon, until 14:00. Even then, this movement was hampered by mines and enemy positions still in action further up the draw.

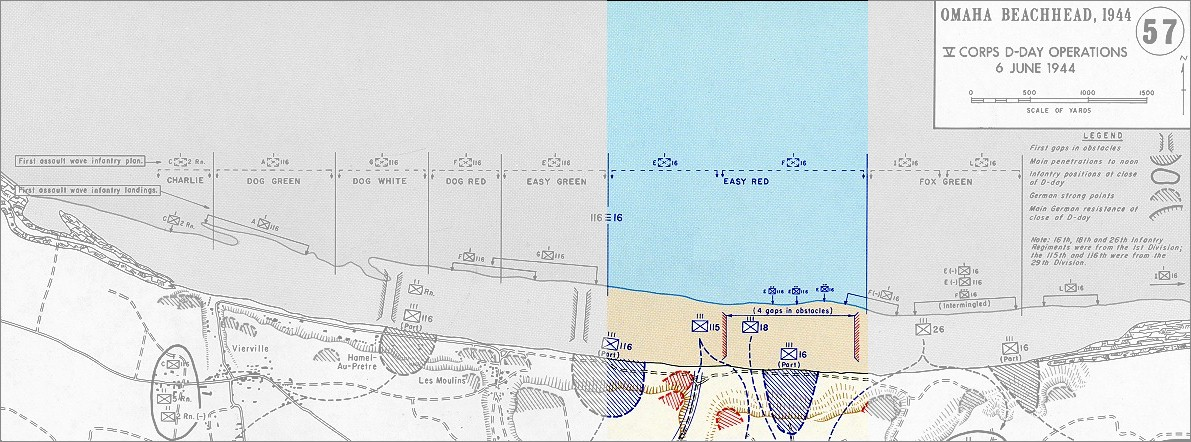
Easy Red sector of the Omaha Beach landings, 6 June 1944

- Northwest Europe The 18th Infantry Regiment would experience almost eleven months of continual combat operations from the allied invasion of Normandy (June 6, 1944) to the end of World War II in Europe in May 1945. Among the many actions that the regiment participated in were Battle of Aachen, Battle of Hürtgen Forest, The Battle of the Bulge and crossing at the Remagen bridgehead 15–16 March 1945.

=== Vietnam War ===
On 25 June 1965 the Regiment's 1st and 2nd battalions embarked on the USS General W. H. Gordon at Oakland Army Terminal bound for South Vietnam. On 12 July the 1st Battalion and an artillery battery disembarked at Cam Ranh Bay to provide security for the new port being built there. On 14 July the 2nd Battalion and other units disembarked at Vung Tau. Over the next two days the troops were flown from Vung Tau Air Base to Bien Hoa Air Base. Upon arrival, they moved by truck to their prospective base camp, about 3km southeast of the air base. For the first few days in Vietnam, the force came under the command of MACV, but on 19 July the 173rd Airborne Brigade assumed operational control. The arrangement lasted until the 1st Division headquarters reached Vietnam in October. On 29 September the 1st Battalion, 18th Infantry ceded its security mission at Cam Ranh Bay to the recently arrived 1st Brigade, 101st Airborne Division and rejoined the rest of the Regiment at Bien Hoa.

=== Operation Desert Shield/Operation Desert Storm ===
- The 1st BN 18th Inf was assigned to the 197th Inf Bde Sep in Jul 1990 at Ft Benning Ga.
- In September 1990, the 197th Infantry Brigade (M)(S) deployed from Fort Benning Georgia to Saudi Arabia, attached to the 24th Infantry Division in defense of the Arabian kingdom during Operation Desert Shield. The combat units of the 197th included 1st Bn 18th Inf Regt (1/18), 2nd Bn 18th Inf Regt (2/18), 4/41 Field Artillery and 2/69 Armor.
- During Operation Desert Storm, the 24th ID was the right flank of the XVIII Airborne Corps' push into Iraq. As the division pushed north, elements of the 197th engaged the enemy in Basra during the offensive, to include soldiers from 1/18.
- Upon returning from ODS/S, the 197th Infantry Brigade transitioned to become the 3rd Brigade of the 24th Infantry Division. Soldiers who deployed to ODS/S, as a result of the attachment to the 24th ID, are authorized to wear the combat patch for either the 197th Infantry Brigade or the 24th ID.

December 1990, Elements of 5/18, and 4/18 Brigade deployed from NATO in Europe to Kingdom of Saudi Arabia for Operations Desert Shield, engaging into Iraq and Kuwait for Desert Storm and Provide Comfort. Units were inactivated shortly after Jun 1991.

=== Global War on Terror ===
- Operation Iraqi Freedom II. In January 2004 the 1st Battalion, 18th Infantry Regiment deployed as part of the 2nd "Dagger" Brigade Combat Team, 1st Infantry Division from their home station in Schweinfurt, Germany for OIF II. 1–18 Infantry redeployed to Schweinfurt, Germany in February 2005.
- The battalion commander, then-Lieutenant Colonel Jeffrey Sinclair was quoted in The Age (Melbourne, Australia) regarding use of money to fight the Iraqi insurgency:

Lieutenant-Colonel, commander of the 1st Battalion, 18th Infantry Regiment in Tikrit, paid $US500 to a driver to get his car repaired; paid "benevolent" money to the family of a victim of violence; paid people to clean streets; bought soccer kits for a team and repaired a swimming pool. Other officers have given money to ice-cream vendors, chicken farmers and hardware suppliers to get their businesses going. "I'm trying to give them something to do rather than take shots at someone," said Colonel Sinclair, who said he gets $US50,000 every three or four weeks to distribute. "It's not bribery. It's priming the pump. And it works well." The cash incentive scheme comes as some top officers are questioning whether the practice of keeping their troops highly visible in Iraq is doing more harm than good.

- Operation Iraqi Freedom 06-08. On 1 September 2006 the 1st Battalion, 18th Infantry Regiment deployed as part of the 2nd "Dagger" Brigade Combat Team, 1st Infantry Division from their home station in Schweinfurt, Germany for OIF 06-08. The battalion was task organized, sending Company B to Ramadi, Iraq with Task Force 1–77 AR and in return receiving Company A, 1–77 Armor, a Fire Support Team from 1–7 Field Artillery, a platoon of combat engineers from 9th Engineer Battalion, and a Maintenance Support Team for 299th Forward Support Battalion. Task Force 1–18 Infantry moved north into Iraq on 19 October 2006 and occupied FOB Falcon, Baghdad. The battalion task force conducted combat operation in the Al Rasheed district of southwest Baghdad until 21 November 2007, when it redeployed back to Schweinfurt, Germany.
- Operation Iraqi Freedom 2008–2009 1st Battalion was sent to Baghdad in support of combat operations. There they helped the Iraqi Army through elections and policing actions. Headquartered at Camp Justice with several "FOBs" in the northwestern part of the city.
- Operation Enduring Freedom 08-09. In 2008 the 2nd Battalion, 18th Infantry Regiment was part of Combined Joint Force Task 101 in Afghanistan. They operated in Khost, Kunar, Kandahar and Kabul provinces for most of their times in the Chapa Dara and Chahar Dara district before the large offensive.
- Operation New Dawn, Iraq, 2010-2011. 1st Battalion, 18th Infantry deployed in NOV 2010 to NOV 2011 as part of the Dagger Brigade (2/1ID). The battalion's mission was to partner with the 9th and 11th Iraqi Army Divisions to increase their operational capabilities. The efforts of the battalion and its Military Transition Teams were instrumental in the continued development of those forces and their ability to provide security for Iraq. On June 6, the sniper section, attached to 1-7FA at Camp Loyalty, attempted to engage insurgents who launched an IRAM (improvised, rocket-assisted, munition) attack that killed several Soldiers and friends. Barbaric operated at OLD MOD, Chaos operated at FOB Hammer, Dog operated at Rustimiyah until late January 2011 when it rejoined Apocalypse, Phantom, and HHC at Camp Taji, Iraq. Barbaric led the movement of the battalion's motorized equipment to Kuwait during the retrograde operations from Iraq to Kuwait in October 2011. The Vanguards redeployed to Fort Riley, KS in November 2011 and began preparations for its next mission.
- Operation Enduring Freedom, Horn of Africa, 2013-14. 1–18 IN deployed to the Horn of Africa in December 2013 as part of Operation Enduring Freedom – HOA. The battalion secured key facilities, trained partner nation military forces throughout East Africa and manned the East African Response Force (EARF). Almost immediately upon arrival in theater, the Department of State requested security support in Juba, South Sudan. The EARF deployed to Juba and helped secure the Embassy from December 2013 to April 2014. During this mission, the battalion helped evacuate over 700 US and several other nations' citizens.

=== Victory Day ===
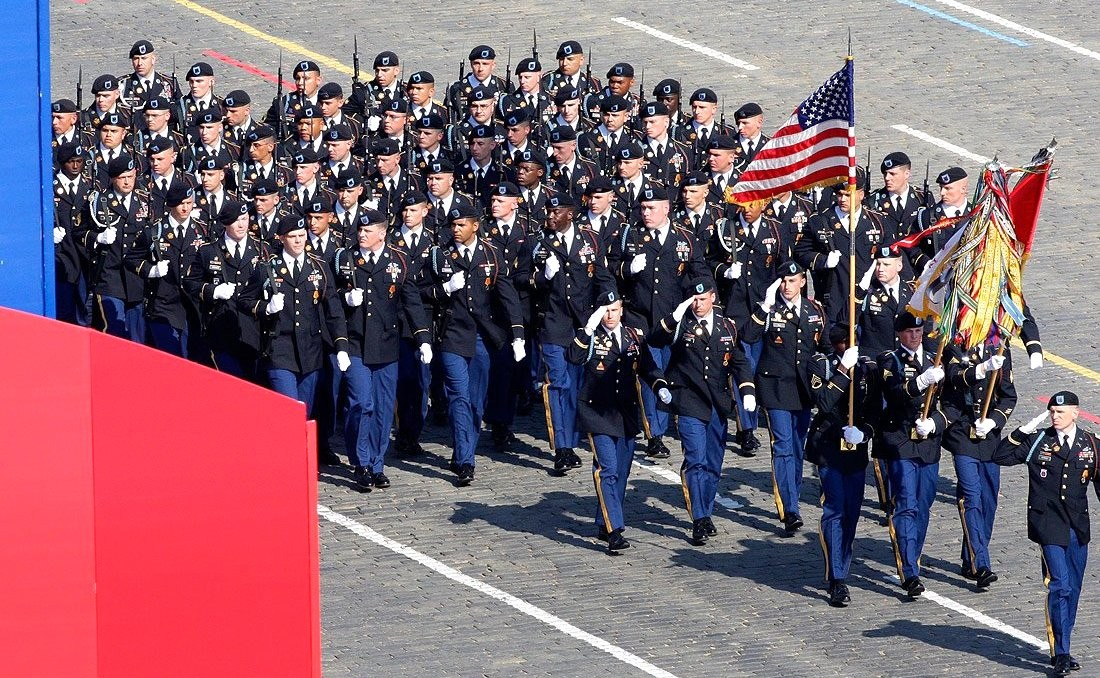
At the 2010 Moscow Victory Day Parade

On 9 May 2010, a detachment led by Captain Matthew Strand from the 2nd Battalion, 18th Infantry Regiment represented the United States in Russia's Victory Day parade across Red Square at the request of Russian Minister of Defence Anatoly Serdyukov in a letter to U.S. Secretary of Defense Robert Gates. They were joined by British, French, and Polish troops as well as detachments from the CIS member states. Labeled by Russian president Dmitry Medvedev as the "Anti-Hitler Coalition," it marked the first time in history that American and NATO troops joined the Russian Military in the 9 May parade. A member of the contingent from Kemah, Texas, Russian-born 1st Lieutenant Ilya Ivanov, is a descendant of Major Alexander Peteryaev, a platoon leader in the Soviet Red Army. The Head of the Military University of the Russian Ministry of Defense, Colonel General Valery Marchenkov later awarded to soldiers for their participation in the parade.

== Lineage ==
- Constituted 3 May 1861, in the Regular Army as the 1st Battalion, 18th Infantry Regiment.
- Organized 22 July 1861, at Camp Thomas, Ohio
- Reorganized and redesignated 21 September 1866, as the 18th Infantry
- Consolidated in April 1869 with the 25th Infantry (see ANNEX) and consolidated unit designated as the 18th Infantry
- Assigned 8 June 1917, to the 1st Expeditionary Division (later redesignated as the 1st Infantry Division)
- Relieved 15 February 1957, from assignment to the 1st Infantry Division and reorganized as a parent regiment under the Combat Arms Regimental System
- Withdrawn 16 June 1989, from the Combat Arms Regimental System and reorganized under the United States Army Regimental System

=== ANNEX ===
- Constituted 3 May 1861, in the Regular Army as the 2d Battalion, 16th Infantry Regiment.
- Organized 12 May 1862, at Camp Thomas, Ohio

Assigned to the 1st Division XIV Army Corps under Major General George H. Thomas, participated at the Battle of Chickamauga, GA as part of the Third (Regular) Brigade and was instrumental in preventing the destruction of the Union Army under Major General William Rosecrans at Chickamauga, GA Sep 1863. Participated in the operations at Chattanooga, GA and the following Atlanta Campaign assigned to the Third Brigade. Served under Brig. General John H. King and Brig. Gen. Absalom Baird's First Division and MG John M Palmer until the Attack at Utoy Creek. The 18th US Infantry distinguished itself in its performance, along with the 15th US Infantry, in a combat water crossing at North Utoy Creek, securing the position for the 1st Division under Brigadier General Johnston 3 Aug 1864 and participated in the preliminary and main attacks on 6 August 1864. Involved in cutting the rail lines south of Atlanta at Rough and Ready Station (Forest Park GA 30 Aug 1864). After the Capture of Atlanta, the regiment and the rest of the Army of the Cumberland moved back in pursuit of Hood's Confederate Army into Tennessee. Involved in the Battle of Nashville and the destruction of the Confederate Army of Tennessee on 15–16 December 1864. The unit crest shows the symbol of the XIV Corps, the Acorn, adopted by Gen. George H. Thomas, "The Rock of Chickamauga."

- Reorganized and redesignated 21 September 1866, as the 25th Infantry
- Consolidated in April 1869 with the 18th Infantry and consolidated unit designated as the 18th Infantry

On 17 March 2008, 1–18 Infantry was inactivated in Schweinfurt, Germany, to be relocated to Fort Riley, Kansas. On 28 March, the 18th Infantry Regimental colors were un-cased at Fort Riley, and the unit that was the 1st Battalion, 41st Infantry Regiment re-flagged to 1–18 Infantry (Combined Arms Battalion). The 28 March re-flagging at Fort Riley was part of the 3rd Heavy Brigade Combat Team, 1st Armored Division's re-flagging to the 2nd Heavy Brigade Combat Team, 1st Infantry Division, bringing all 1st Infantry Division brigades but 3rd BCT, 1 ID to Fort Riley.

On 15 July 2009, 2–18 Infantry stood up in Baumholder, Germany as part of the 170th Infantry Brigade Combat Team. The unit was stood up to replace 1–6 Infantry (Regulars), part 2nd Brigade of the 1st Armored Division.

=== Campaign participation credit ===
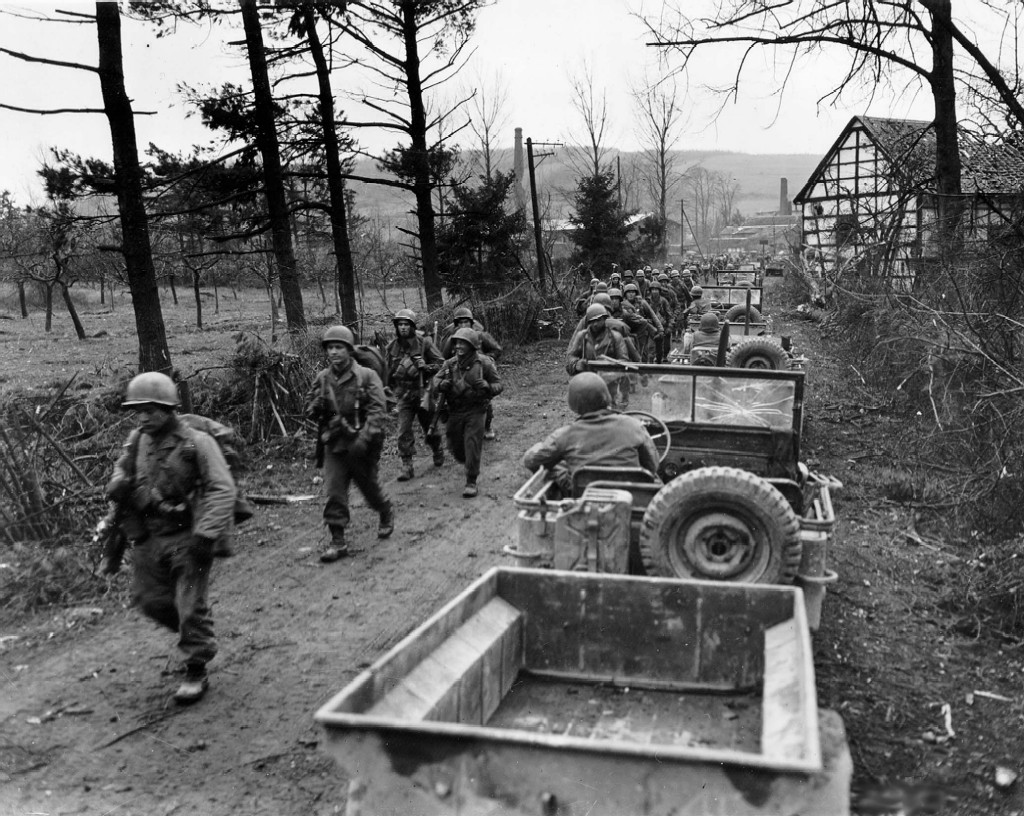
Company C, 1st Battalion, 18th Infantry Regiment, 1st Infantry Division moving up into Frauwüllesheim, Germany, after crossing the Roer River on 29 February 1945.

- Civil War:
1. Murfreesboro;
2. Chickamauga;
3. Chattanooga;
4. Atlanta campaign;
5. Kentucky 1862;
6. Mississippi 1862;
7. Tennessee 1863;
8. Georgia 1864
- Indian Wars:
1. Dakota 1867;
2. Wyoming 1867;
3. Montana 1881;
4. Montana 1882
- Spanish–American War:
1. Manila
- Philippine–American War:
1. Iloilo;
2. Panay 1899;
3. Panay 1900
- World War I:
1. Montdidier-Noyon;
2. Aisne-Marne;
3. St. Mihiel;
4. Meuse-Argonne;
5. Lorraine 1917;
6. Lorraine 1918;
7. Picardy 1918
- World War II:
1. Algeria-French Morocco (with arrowhead);
2. Tunisia;
3. Sicily (with arrowhead);
4. Normandy (with arrowhead);
5. Northern France;
6. Rhineland;
7. Ardennes-Alsace;
8. Central Europe
- Vietnam:
1. Defense;
2. Counteroffensive;
3. Counteroffensive, Phase II;
4. Counteroffensive, Phase III;
5. Tet Counteroffensive;
6. Counteroffensive, Phase IV;
7. Counteroffensive, Phase V;
8. Counteroffensive, Phase VI;
9. Tet 69/Counteroffensive;
10. Summer-Fall 1969;
11. Winter-Spring 1970
- Southwest Asia:
1. Defense of Saudi Arabia;
2. Liberation and Defense of Kuwait;
3. Cease-Fire
- Iraq:
1. Iraqi Governance;
2. Iraqi Surge;
3. Iraqi Sovereignty
- Afghanistan:
1. Kunar Province/Korengal Valley;
2. Consolidation III;
3. Transition I

=== Decorations ===
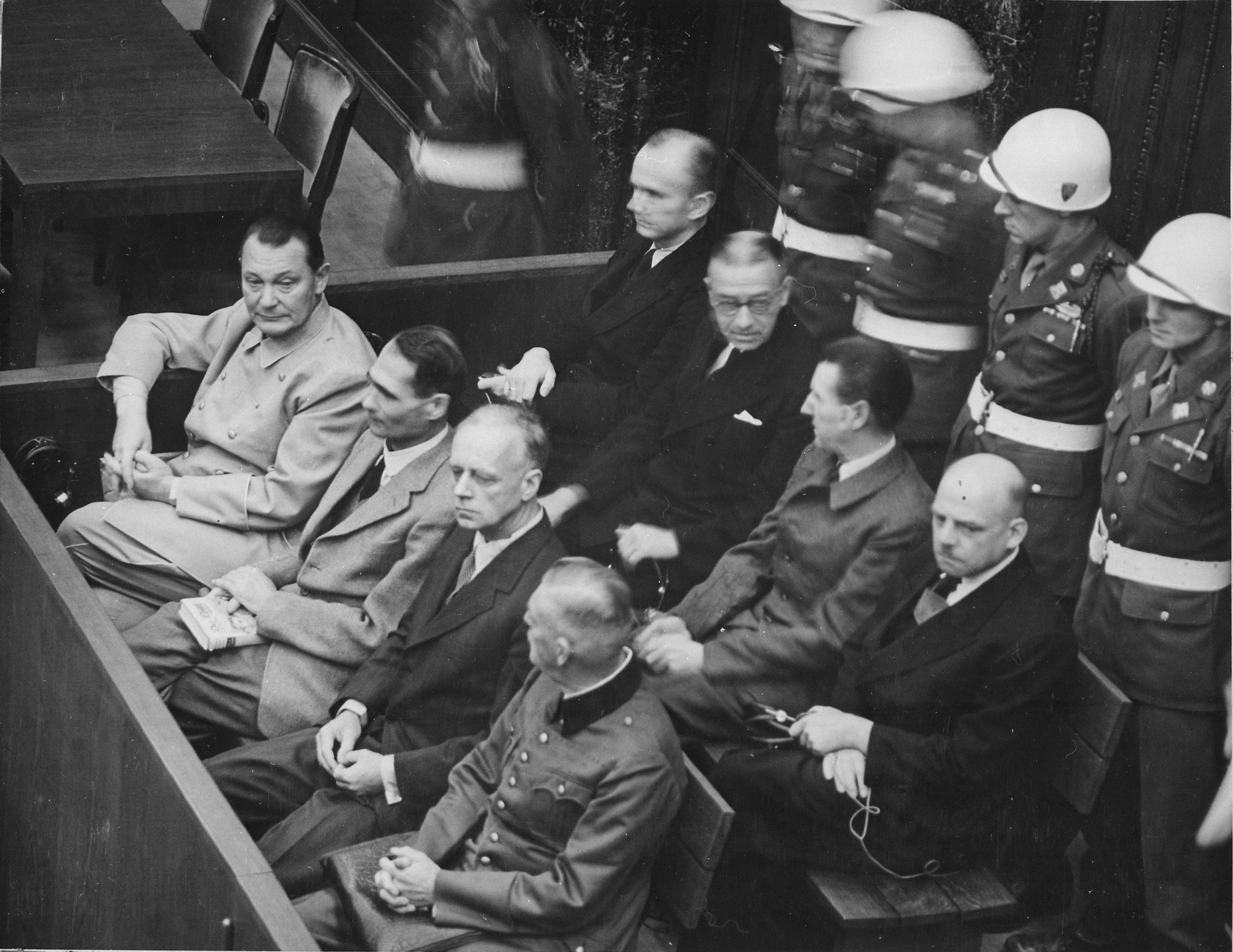
Soldiers from the 18th Infantry Regiment stand guard over Nazi leaders during the Nuremberg Trials that followed World War II.

1. Presidential Unit Citation (Army) for BEJA, TUNISIA
2. Presidential Unit Citation (Army) for NORMANDY
3. Presidential Unit Citation (Army) for AACHEN, GERMANY
4. Valorous Unit Award for BINH LONG PROVINCE
5. Valorous Unit Award for DI AN DISTRICT
6. Valorous Unit Award for IRAQ
7. Valorous Unit Award for IRAQ-KUWAIT
8. Valorous Unit Award for the 1st Battalion (minus Company B) for Operation Iraqi Freedom VI-VIII, 12 October 2006 – 17 November 2007
9. Valorous Unit Award for Bravo Company, 1st Battalion, 18th Infantry Regiment, Operation Iraqi Freedom VI-VIII, Al Ramadi, Al Anbar Province, 10 Feb 2007 – 17 Mar 2007
10. Navy Unit Commendation for Company B, 1st Battalion for Operation Iraqi Freedom VI-VIII, October 2006 – November 2007
11. Meritorious Unit Commendation for OPERATION NEW DAWN (IRAQ)
12. Army Superior Unit Award for 1994
13. Army Superior Unit Award for 1996–1997
14. Army Superior Unit Award for 1998–1999
15. French Croix de Guerre with Palm, World War I for AISNE-MARNE
16. French Croix de Guerre with Palm, World War I for MEUSE-ARGONNE
17. French Croix de Guerre with Palm, World War II for KASSERINE
18. French Croix de Guerre with Palm, World War II for NORMANDY
19. French Médaille militaire, Fourragere
20. Belgian Fourragere 1940
21. Cited in the Order of the Day of the Belgian Army for action at Mons
22. Cited in the Order of the Day of the Belgian Army for action at Eupen-Malmedy
23. Republic of Vietnam Cross of Gallantry with Palm, Streamer embroidered VIETNAM 1965–1968
24. Republic of Vietnam Cross of Gallantry with Palm, Streamer embroidered VIETNAM 1969
25. Republic of Vietnam Civil Action Honor Medal, First Class, Streamer embroidered VIETNAM 1965–1970

== Commanders ==
Source of commanders: 18th Infantry Regiment Association Names marked by an @ indicate actual commanders in the absence of the colonel; an asterisk (*) = Commanders of the 18th Battle Group; 1–18 = 1st Battalion, 18th Infantry; 2–18 = 2d Battalion, 18th Infantry; and so forth. (1) following a name indicates future commander of 1st Infantry Division

- Henry B. Carrington 1861–69
- Thomas H. Ruger 1869–86
- John E. Yard (died in command) 1886–89
- Henry M. Lazelle 1889–94
- Daingerfield Parker 1894–96
- David D. Van Valzah 1896–99
- Gilbert S. Carpenter 1899-99
- James M. J. Sanno 1899–1903
- Charles Badger Hall 1903–07
- Thomas F. Davis 1907–13
- James S. Rogers 1913–16
- Howard F. Glenn 1916–16
- Samuel E. Smiley 1916–17
- James W. McAndrew 1917
- Ulysses G. McAlexander 1917
- James W. McAndrew 1917
- Ulysses G. McAlexander 1917
- Frank Parker (1) (BRO – 18 Oct – 20 Nov 1918)
- Charles A. Hunt 1918–1919
- Orrin R. Wolfe 1919–23
- John J. Bradley 1923–27
- Charles F. Humphrey, Jr. 1927–29
- William B. Graham 1929–31
- John H. Hughes 1931
- Claude H. Miller 1931–33
- Noble J. Wiley 1933–35
- Royden E. Beebe(1–18 – MAJ "Cappy" Wells) 1935–37
- Ray W. Brabsen 1937–39
- Eley P Denson 1939–41
- 1–18: LTC John N. Hopkins
- 2–18: LTC Charles W. Yuill
- 3–18: LTC John C. Blizzard, Jr.
1. Edward G. Sherburn 1941–42
2. Frank U. Greer 1 Jul 1942 – 23 May 1943
- 1–18: MAJ Richard C. Parker
- 2–18: MAJ John L. Powers
- 3–18: LTC Courtney P. Brown
- 1–18: LTC Robert H. York
- 1–18: LTC Joseph W. Sisson, III
- 2–18: LTC Ben Sternberg
- 3–18: LTC Joseph W. Sisson, III
1. George A. Smith, Jr. 23 May 1943 – 25 Feb 1945
- 1–18: LTC Henry G. Learnard, Jr.
- 2–18: LTC John Williamson
- 3–18: LTC Courtney P. Brown
- 3–18: LTC Elisha O. Peckham
1. John Williamson 25 Feb 1945 – Oct 1945
- 1–18: LTC Henry G. Learnard Feb 1945 – Oct 1945
- 2–18: LTC Henry Middleworth June 1945 – Aug 1945
- 3–18: LTC George Pecham June 1945 – July 1945
- 3–18: MAJ Frank Dupree July 1945 – Aug 1945
1. Henry G. Learnard, Jr Oct 1945 – Mar 1946
- 1–18: CPT John Maggason Oct 1945 – Dec 1945
- 1–18: CPT George K. Maertins Dec 1945 – June 1946 (Jan 1946?)
- 1–18: CPT William Coshun Jan 1946 – Feb 1946
- 1–18: MAJ James D. Green Feb 1946 – Apr 1946
- 2–18: MAJ Thomas Murphy Aug 1945 – Sep 1945
- 2–18: LTC George B. Pickett Sep 1945 – Nov 1945
- 2–18: LTC Rich G. Williams 21–28 Nov 1945
- 2–18: LTC Ernest C. Peters Nov 1945 – Dec 1945
- 2–18: MAJ Jos W. Nelson Dec 1945 – Feb 1946
- 3–18: MAJ Keith P. Fabianich Aug 1945 – Nov 1945
- 3–18: LTC Rich G. Williams Dec 1945 – Jan 1946
- 3–18: CPT William Coshun Jan 1946 – Mar 1946
1. James S. Luckett Mar–Aug 1946
- 1–18: CPT William Coshun Apr 1946 – May 1946
- 1–18: LTC Herman O. Overman May 1946 – Oct 1946
- 2–18: LTC George B. Pickett Feb 1946 – Nov 1946
- 3–18: MAJ Keith P. Fabianich Mar 46 – June 46
- 3–18: LTC Rich G. Williams June 1946 – Sep 1946
1. LTC Gerald C. Kelleher Aug 1946
2. Sterling A. Wood Aug 1946–? 1948
- 1–18: LTC Gerald C. Kelleher Oct 1946--? (May 1949)
- 2–18: LTC James F. Skells Nov 1946--?
- 3–18: LTC William A. McNulty Sep 1946--?
1. Rinaldo Van Brunt (May) 1948–50
- 2–18: LTC John G. Bennett (May) 1948–
- 3–18: MAJ Chester C. Arthur (May) 1948–
- 2–18: LTC Lloyd R. Fredenhall, Jr.(May) 1949
- 3–18: LTC John C. Speedie (May) 1949
- 1–18: LTC Joseph J. Coffey
- 2–18: LTC Eben F. Swift
- 3–18: LTC Elias C. Townsend
1. Ralph W. Zwicker 1950–52
2. Benjamin F. Evans 1952–53
3. Eugene A. Salet 1953–(Jun) 1954
- 1–18: LTC Albert H. Smith, Jr. ? 1954
- 2–18: LTC Vincent Guerin ? 1954
- 3–18: LTC Arndt Mueller ? 1954
1. George T. Calvin (Colvin) 1954 – Sep 1955
2. William A. Cunningham, III Sep 1955 – Feb 1957
3. William A. Cunningham, III Sep 1955 – Feb 1957
- Frank J. Sackton Feb 1957–58
- Theodore H. Andrews 1958–60
- Glover S. Johns, Jr. 1960 – Jan 1962
- Max V. Kirkbride Jan 1962–1963
- Samuel M. Karrick, Jr. -Apr 1963
- Robert L. Dickerson Apr–Sep 1963
- William F. Malone Sep 1963 – Jan 1964

[Need list of 3rd Battalion commanders] [Need list of 4th Battalion commanders in Germany]

- 1–18: LTC Jere O Whittington Jan 1964 – Jul 1965
- 1–18: LTC Norman J. Salisbury Jul 1965 – Jan 1966
- 2–18: LTC Edgar N. Glotzbach Jul 1965 – Jan 1966
- 1–18: LTC Karl R. Morton Jan–May 1966
- 2–18: LTC Herbert J. McChrystal, Jr. Jan–Jul 1966
- 1–18: MAJ John C. Bard May–Jul 1966
- 1–18: LTC Warner S. Goodwin, Jr. Jul 1966 – Jan 1967
- 2–18: LTC Lewis R. Baurmann Jul 1966 – May 1967
- 1–18: LTC Earle L. Denton Jan–Mar 1967
- 1–18: LTC Richard E. Cavazos Mar–Dec 1967
- 2–18: LTC James F. Price May–Dec 1967
- 1–18: LTC George M Tronsrue, Jr. Dec 1967 – Jun 1968
- 2–18: LTC Max R. Pfanzelter Dec 1967 – Feb 1968
- 1–18: LTC Ronald J. Gillis Jun–Dec 1968
- 2–18: LTC Max L. Waldrop Feb–Aug 1968
- 1–18: LTC Robert E. Price Dec 1968 – Jun 1969
- 2–18: LTC James E. Crow Aug 1968 – Feb 1969
- 2–18: LTC David Teberg Feb–Jul 1969
- 1–18: LTC Karl F Lange Jun–Oct 1969
- 2–18: LTC Ronald Ochis Jul 1969 – Apr 1970
- 1–18: LTC Thomas R. Finley Oct 1969 – Apr 1970
- 1–18: LTC Jack O Thomas Apr–May 1970
- 1–18: LTC James G Humphreys May 1970 – Jun 1971
- 1–18: MAJ Buddy F. Poole Jun–Aug 1971
- 1–18: LTC James M. Tucker Aug 1971 – Dec 1972
- 1–18: LTC Roy W. Muth Dec 1972–74
- 1–18: LTC Moses Smalls 1974–75
- 1–18: LTC J Warmath 1975–77
- 1–18: LTC R Boyd 1977–79
- 1–18: LTC D Gannon 1979–81
- 1–18: LTC M A. McDermott 1981–83
- 2–18: LTC James F. Brickman (Feb 1982 – Jul 1984)
- Inactivated from Regular Army (1983–87)
- [Need list of commanders of 3rd Battalion]
- Reactivated in Regular Army and Persian Gulf duty (1987–96)
- 2–18: LTC David W. Wilson Oct 1987 – Aug 1988
- 2–18: LTC Richard L. Stouder Aug 1988 – Oct 1990
- 1–18: LTC Archibald V. Arnold, III Jul 1989–90
- 3–18: LTC Peter Clegg Nov 1982 – Oct 1985
- 3–18: MAJ David Wilson Oct 1985 – Oct 1986
- 3–18: LTC Robert W. O'Brien Oct 1986 – Oct 1990
- 4–18: LTC Robert J. St. Onge, Jr. Jun 1989-19??
- 5–18: LTC George W. Aldridge Sep 1989–??
- 1–18: LTC E. W. Chamberlain, III Jul 1990 – Jul 1992
- 2–18: LTC Eric T. Olson ? 1990 – Oct 1992
- 3–18: LTC Thomas F. Finn, Jr. Oct 1990 – Oct 1993
- 4–18: LTC Robert J. Fulcher Jr. 8 Mar 1990 – 15 Nov 1991
- 5–18: LTC Harold M. Neely 1990–1991
- 1–18: LTC Roy H. Adams, Jr. Jul 1992 – Jul 1994
- 2–18: LTC Alex McKindra Oct 1992 – Oct 1994
- 3–18: LTC Mark Grazier Oct 1993 – Apr 1994
- 1–18: LTC Edward M. Cook Jul 1994 – May 1996
- 2–18: LTC Brian R. Zahn Oct 1994 – May 1996
- 1–18: LTC Steven Layfield April 1996 – Jul 1997
- 1–18: LTC William B. Norman Jul 1997 – Jun 1999
- 1–18: LTC John M. Murray Jun 1999 – Jun 2001
- 1–18: LTC Butch Botters Jun 2001 – Jun 2003
- 1–18: LTC Jeffrey Sinclair Jun 2003 – Jun 2005
- 1–18: LTC George A. Glaze Jun 2005 – Jan 2008
- 1–18: LTC Steve Miska Jan 2008 – Mar 2008
- 1–18: LTC Christopher H. Beckert Mar 2008 – Apr 2008
- 1–18: LTC John Vermeesch Apr 2008 – May 2010
- 1–18: LTC John Cross May 2010 – May 2012
- 1–18: LTC Robert Magee May 2012 – June 2014
- 1–18: LTC Amado Sanchez IV June 2014 – Apr 2016
- 1–18: LTC Peter Moon Apr 2016 – July 2018
- 1–18: LTC Jay A. Bessey July 2018 – July 2020
- 1-18: LTC Andrew J. Kulas July 2020 - May 2022
- 1-18: LTC John P. Vickery May 2022 - Present

== Medal of Honor recipients ==
- First Lieutenant Henry B. Freeman. Civil War. On 31 December 1862, while assigned to the 1st Battalion, 18th Infantry Regiment at the Battle of Stone River, Tennessee, 1LT Freeman voluntarily went to the front and picked up and carried to a place of safety, under a heavy fire from the enemy, an acting field officer who had been wounded, and was about to fall into enemy hands.
- First Lieutenant Frederick Phisterer. Civil War. On 31 December 1862, while assigned to the 2d Battalion, 18th Infantry Regiment at the Battle of Stone River, Tennessee, 1LT Phisterer voluntarily conveyed, under a heavy fire, information to the commander of a battalion of regular troops by which the battalion was saved from capture or annihilation.
- Sergeant George Grant. Indian Wars. Assigned to Company E, 18th U.S. Infantry Regiment. At Fort Phil Kearny to Fort C. F. Smith, Dakota Territory, February 1867. Citation: Bravery, energy, and perseverance, involving much suffering and privation through attacks by hostile Indians, deep snows, etc., while voluntarily carrying dispatches. Date of issue: 6 May 1871.
- Private Carlton W. Barrett. World War II. On 6 June 1944, during the D-Day invasion near St. Laurent-sur-Mer, France, PVT Barrett, landing in the face of extremely heavy enemy fire, was forced to wade ashore through neck-deep water. Disregarding the personal danger, he returned to the surf again and again to assist his floundering comrades and save them from drowning. Refusing to remain pinned down by the intense barrage of small-arms and mortar fire poured at the landing points, Pvt. Barrett, working with fierce determination, saved many lives by carrying casualties to an evacuation boat Iying offshore. In addition to his assigned mission as guide, he carried dispatches the length of the fire-swept beach; he assisted the wounded; he calmed the shocked; he arose as a leader in the stress of the occasion.
- Staff Sergeant Walter D. Ehlers. World War II. On 9 June 1944, near Goville, France, he led his unit's attack against German forces and single-handedly defeated several enemy machinegun nests. The next day, his platoon came under heavy fire and he covered their withdrawal, carried a wounded rifleman to safety, and continued to lead despite his own wounds. For his actions, he was issued the Medal of Honor six months later, on 19 December 1944.
- Staff Sergeant Arthur F. DeFranzo. World War II. On 10 June 1944, while serving with the 18th Infantry Regiment near Vaubadon, France, he was wounded while rescuing an injured man from hostile fire. Despite his own injuries, he led an attack on the enemy positions and continued to advance and encourage his men even after being hit several more times. He destroyed an enemy machine gun position just before succumbing to his wounds. For these actions, he was posthumously awarded the Medal of Honor seven months later, on 4 January 1945.
- Private First Class Gino J. Merli. World War II. On the evening of 4 September 1944, near Sars la Bruyere, Belgium, his company was attacked by a superior German force. Their position was overwhelmed, but PFC Merli stayed with his machine gun covering their retreat. When his position was overrun, he feigned death while German soldiers prodded him with their bayonets, only to rise and confront the enemy when they withdrew. Twice he fooled German soldiers into believing he was no longer a threat, only to attack them again when they left him for dead. In the morning, a counterattack forced the Germans to ask for a truce. The negotiating party found Merli still at his gun.
- Staff Sergeant Joseph E. Schaefer. World War II. On 24 September 1944, near Stolberg, Germany, SSG Schaefer led his squad in their defense against a German attack. He voluntarily took the most dangerous defensive position, killed many of the attacking soldiers, and single-handedly captured ten. He then participated in the American counter-attack and freed a group of American soldiers captured earlier. For his actions during the battle, he was awarded the Medal of Honor eleven months later, on 22 August 1945.
- Captain Robert "Bobbie" Evan Brown Jr. World War II. On 8 October 1944, at Crucifix Hill, Aachen, Germany, while serving with Company C, 18th Infantry Regiment, while under continuous artillery mortar, automatic, and small-arms fire, CPT Brown single-handedly knocked out three enemy bunkers. Wounded, but refusing medical treatment he went out alone to reconnoiter other enemy positions. He sustained two more wounds but was successful in relaying the information of the enemy positions which lead to their destruction.
- Sergeant Max Thompson. World War II. On 18 October 1944, while assigned to Company K, 18th Infantry Regiment near Haaren, Germany, he single-handedly attacked the German forces on several occasions. For his actions, he was awarded the Medal of Honor eight months later, on 18 June 1945.
- Staff Sergeant George Peterson.. World War II. On 30 March 1945, while assigned to Company K, 18th Infantry Regiment near Eisern, Germany, Peterson was severely wounded but continued in the fight and single-handedly destroyed three German machinegun nests before receiving another, fatal, wound. He was posthumously awarded the Medal of Honor seven months later, on 17 October 1945.
- First Lieutenant Walter J. Will. World War II. On 30 March 1945, while assigned to Company K, 18th Infantry Regiment near Eisern, Germany, 1LT Will rescued three wounded men, single-handedly disabled two German machinegun nests and led his squad in the capture of two others, all despite his own injuries. Mortally wounded while leading a charge on the enemy, Will was posthumously awarded the Medal of Honor seven months later, on 17 October 1945.

== See also ==
- List of United States Regular Army Civil War units
