= Walter D. Ehlers =

United States Army soldier

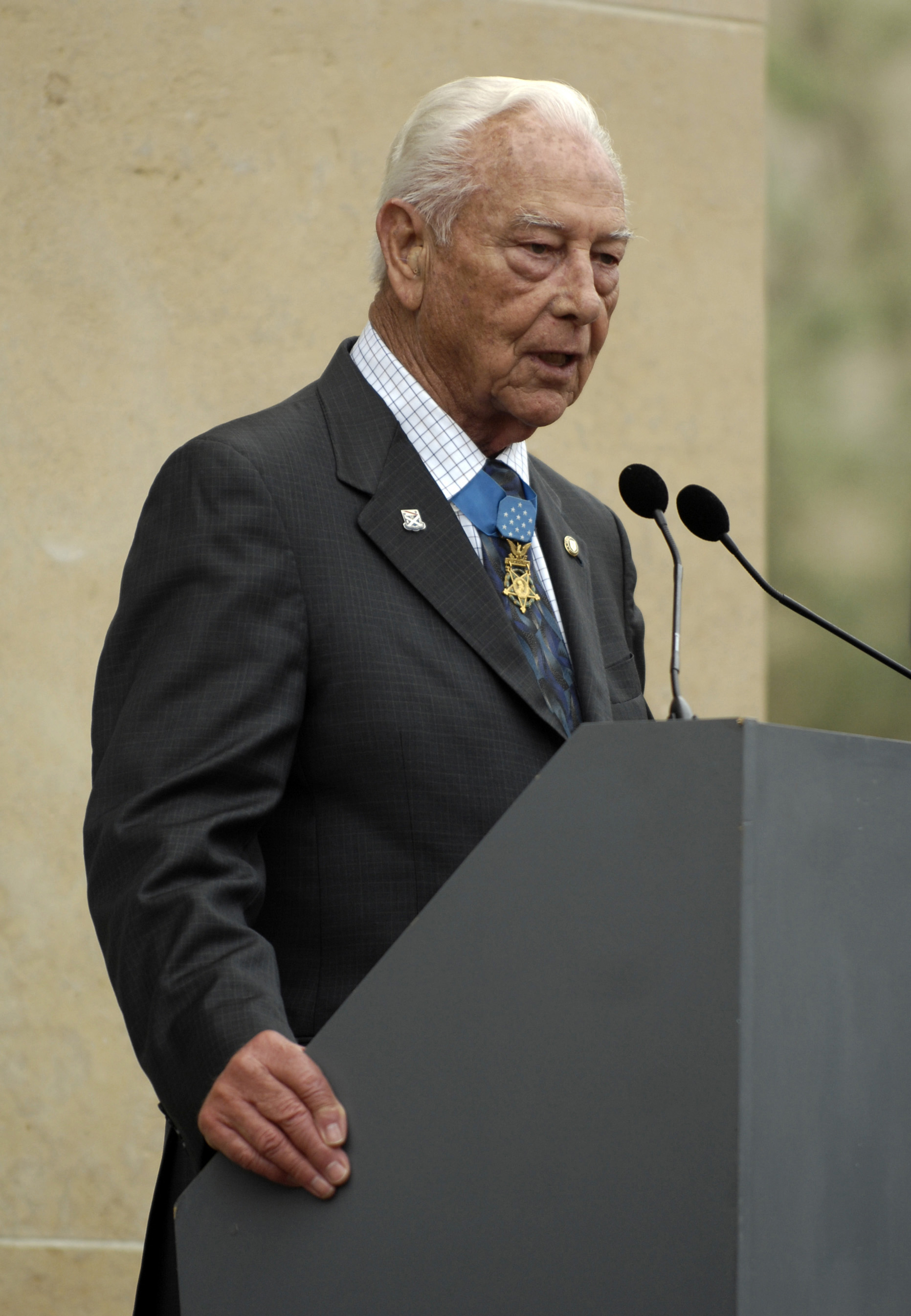
- Ehlers speaking at a 2007 ceremony commemorating the anniversary of D-Day
- Born: May 7, 1921; Junction City, Kansas, US
- Died: February 20, 2014 (aged 92); Long Beach, California, US
- Burial place: Riverside National Cemetery
- Military career
- Allegiance: United States
- Branch: United States Army
- Service years: 1940–1945
- Rank: Second Lieutenant
- Units: 18th Infantry Regiment, 1st Infantry Division
- Conflicts: World War II: Operation Torch; Allied invasion of Sicily; Normandy landings
- Awards: Medal of Honor; Silver Star; Purple Heart (3)

Walter David Ehlers (May 7, 1921 – February 20, 2014) was a United States Army soldier and a recipient of the US armed forces' highest decoration, the Medal of Honor, for his actions in World War II.

== Early life ==
Ehlers was born on May 7, 1921, in Junction City, Kansas.

== Military service ==
Ehlers joined the United States Army from the city of Manhattan, Kansas, in October 1940. He and his older brother Roland served in the same unit and participated in the fighting in North Africa and Sicily.

By D-Day on June 6, 1944, Ehlers was a staff sergeant and squad leader in the 18th Infantry Regiment, 1st Infantry Division. His squad, part of the invasion's second wave, waited off shore in a Landing Craft, Infantry, while the first group of soldiers landed. When the first wave became pinned down on the beach, his unit was transferred to a Higgins boat and sent forward early to assist. They fought their way off the beach and by June 9 were near the town of Goville, 8 miles (13 km) inland. On that day, he led his unit's attack against German forces and single-handedly defeated several enemy machine gun nests. The next day the platoon came under heavy fire. Ehlers was wounded, but managed to cover the platoon's withdrawal; this included carrying a wounded automatic rifleman to safety and running back through enemy fire to retrieve his Browning Automatic Rifle. After treatment of his wounds, Ehlers refused to be evacuated and continued to lead his squad. For his actions he was awarded the Medal of Honor five months later, on 11 December 1944. He was decorated in Paris in the office of Lieutenant General John C. H. Lee, Commanding General, Communications Zone, ETO. By this time Ehlers had received a battlefield commission to second lieutenant.

On July 14, more than a month after D-Day, Ehlers learned that his brother Roland had died at Omaha Beach when his landing craft was struck by a mortar shell.

== Later life ==
Ehlers appeared in the 1955 film The Long Gray Line, starring Tyrone Power. He went on to work for the Veterans Administration, and as a security guard at Disneyland, California.

Ehlers died on February 20, 2014, of kidney failure in Long Beach, California. He was 92 years old.

Ehlers' Medal of Honor is on display at the National WWII Museum in New Orleans, Louisiana.

== Personal life ==
Ehlers married the former Dorothy Decker, who died in 2017 at the age of 85. They had 3 children, and 11 grandchildren.

== Medal of Honor citation ==
Staff Sergeant Ehlers' official Medal of Honor citation reads:

For conspicuous gallantry and intrepidity at the risk of his life above and beyond the call of duty on 9–10 June 1944, near Goville, France. S/Sgt. Ehlers, always acting as the spearhead of the attack, repeatedly led his men against heavily defended enemy strong points exposing himself to deadly hostile fire whenever the situation required heroic and courageous leadership. Without waiting for an order, S/Sgt. Ehlers, far ahead of his men, led his squad against a strongly defended enemy strong point, personally killing 4 of an enemy patrol who attacked him en route. Then crawling forward under withering machinegun fire, he pounced upon the guncrew and put it out of action. Turning his attention to 2 mortars protected by the crossfire of 2 machineguns, S/Sgt. Ehlers led his men through this hail of bullets to kill or put to flight the enemy of the mortar section, killing 3 men himself. After mopping up the mortar positions, he again advanced on a machinegun, his progress effectively covered by his squad. When he was almost on top of the gun he leaped to his feet and, although greatly outnumbered, he knocked out the position single-handed. The next day, having advanced deep into enemy territory, the platoon of which S/Sgt. Ehlers was a member, finding itself in an untenable position as the enemy brought increased mortar, machinegun, and small arms fire to bear on it, was ordered to withdraw. S/Sgt. Ehlers, after his squad had covered the withdrawal of the remainder of the platoon, stood up and by continuous fire at the semicircle of enemy placements, diverted the bulk of the heavy hostile fire on himself, thus permitting the members of his own squad to withdraw. At this point, though wounded himself, he carried his wounded automatic rifleman to safety and then returned fearlessly over the shell-swept field to retrieve the automatic rifle which he was unable to carry previously. After having his wound treated, he refused to be evacuated, and returned to lead his squad. The intrepid leadership, indomitable courage, and fearless aggressiveness displayed by S/Sgt. Ehlers in the face of overwhelming enemy forces serve as an inspiration to others.

== See also ==
- List of Medal of Honor recipients for World War II
