= US FWS Dennis Winn =

American fisheries vessel

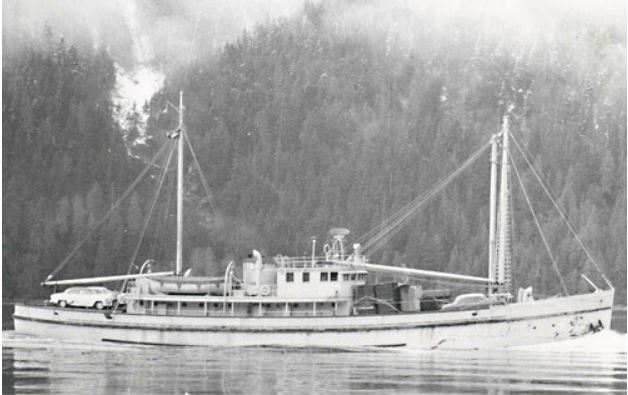
- US FWS Dennis Winn

United States Army
- Name: U.S. Army Lt. Walter J. Will (FS-244)
- Namesake: First Lieutenant Walter J. Will (1922–1945), World War II U.S. Army Medal of Honor recipient
- Builder: Northwestern Shipbuilding Company, Bellingham, Washington
- Completed: April 1944
- Fate: Sold to U.S. Fish and Wildlife Service November 1948
- Notes: U.S. Army Design 342 Freight and Supply (FS).

U.S. Fish and Wildlife Service
- Name: US FWS Dennis Winn
- Namesake: Dennis Winn, U.S. Bureau of Fisheries agent and fisheries science pioneer in Alaska
- Acquired: From United States Army November 1948
- Commissioned: Late 1948
- Decommissioned: 1960
- Home port: Late 1950s: Juneau, Alaska
- Fate: Transferred to Alaska Department of Fish and Game 1960

United States
- Name: MV Dennis Winn
- Namesake: Previous name retained
- Operator: Alaska Department of Fish and Game
- Acquired: From U.S. Fish and Wildlife Service 1960
- Fate: Sold spring 1961

United States
- Name: MV Expansion
- Acquired: From Alaska Department of Fish and Game spring 1961
- Fate: Sold November 1965

France
- Name: MV Temehani
- Acquired: November 1965
- Fate: Sank 1982

General characteristics as Fish and Wildlife Service cargo liner
- Type: Cargo liner
- Tonnage: 540 Gross register tons
- Length: 148 ft (45 m)
- Propulsion: 875-hp (740-kw) Fairbanks-Morse diesel engine

US FWS Dennis Winn was an American cargo liner in commission in the fleet of the United States Fish and Wildlife Service from 1948 to 1960. She frequently provided a passenger and cargo service to and from the Pribilof Islands, and also carried passengers and cargo to and between other communities and FWS stations in the Territory of Alaska. Prior to her fisheries service, she was the United States Army cargo ship U.S. Army Lt. Walter J. Will (FS-244).

After her FWS service, Dennis Winn was the property of the Alaska Department of Fish and Game from 1960 to 1961 and then operated commercially in Alaska as MV Expansion from 1961 to 1965. Purchased by French interests in 1965, she operated thereafter under the French flag in the South Pacific Ocean as MV Temehani until she sank in 1982.

== Construction and U.S. Army service ==
The Seattle, Washington, naval architect Harold Cornelius Hanson designed the vessel as a wooden-hulled coastal cargo ship. The official designation was Design 342 (Vessel, Passenger-Cargo, Diesel, Wood, 148') with only fifteen, FS-238 through FS-252, being built by three builders in Washington and California. (Note: Martinolich Repair, San Francisco, California built 5, Northwestern Shipbuilding, Bellingham, Washington built 6 and Pacific Shipways, Anacortes, Washington built 4.) The Northwestern Shipbuilding Company constructed her at Bellingham, Washington, and delivered her to the United States Army in April 1944 for use during World War II. The U.S. Army placed her in service as the "freight and supply" ship U.S. Army Lt. Walter J. Will (FS-244).

== Fish and Wildlife Service ==
In November 1948, the United States Department of the Interior′s Fish and Wildlife Service obtained Lt. Walter J. Will from the U.S. Army and commissioned her asUS FWS Dennis Winn. The Fish and Wildlife Service immediately placed her in service in the waters of the Territory of Alaska, where she replaced the FWS vessel MV Brown Bear in making regular voyages to and from Bristol Bay, transporting supplies and personnel.

On 21 April 1910, the United States Congress had assigned the responsibility for the management and harvest of northern fur seals, foxes and other fur-bearing animals in the Pribilof Islands in the Bering Sea, as well as for the care, education, and welfare of the Aleut communities in the islands to the United States Bureau of Fisheries (BOF). The Fish and Wildlife Service had assumed these responsibilities when it replaced the Bureau of Fisheries on 30 June 1940. Since 1917, the Bureau of Fisheries and the Fish and Wildlife Service had operated a "Pribilof tender" – a dedicated supply vessel used to transport passengers and cargo to and from the Pribilof Islands Between 1950 and 1963, the FWS′s Pribilof tender was US FWS Penguin II, but during the 1950s Dennis Winn frequently supplemented Penguin II by joining her in transporting cargo and passengers to and from the Pribilof Islands. In the summer of 1955, Dennis Winn hauled 200 tons of building material from Seattle to Saint Paul Island in the Pribilofs, supporting an ongoing construction program to further the development of the islands.

In 1956, the Fish and Wildlife Service underwent a major reorganization in which it was renamed the United States Fish and Wildlife Service (USFWS) and a new Bureau of Commercial Fisheries (BCF) was created which operated the USFWS′s fleet of seagoing ships. Dennis Winn thus came under the control of the BCF. During the late 1950s, she was stationed at Juneau, Alaska, from which she operated in support of BCF management and biological research activities.

== Later career ==
Alaska became a U.S. state on 3 January 1959 and, as a condition of Alaska′s statehood, the USFWS transferred Dennis Winn to the Alaska Department of Fish and Game in 1960. In the spring of 1961, the government of Alaska sold her at auction. Renamed MV Expansion and with her home port at Seward, Alaska, she served as a commercial mail boat and passenger vessel, operating along the coast of the Alaska Peninsula and in the Aleutian Islands, including monthly stops at False Pass. Aboard Expansion, a small store sold fresh produce, ice cream, and other perishable goods during her visits to communities along her route.

In November 1965, French interests purchased Expansion in Seattle and thereafter operated her as a transport ship in the South Pacific Ocean under the name MV Temehani. Temehani sank near Bora Bora in the Society Islands in French Polynesia in 1982.
