= Willy F. James Jr. =

United States Army Medal of Honor recipient

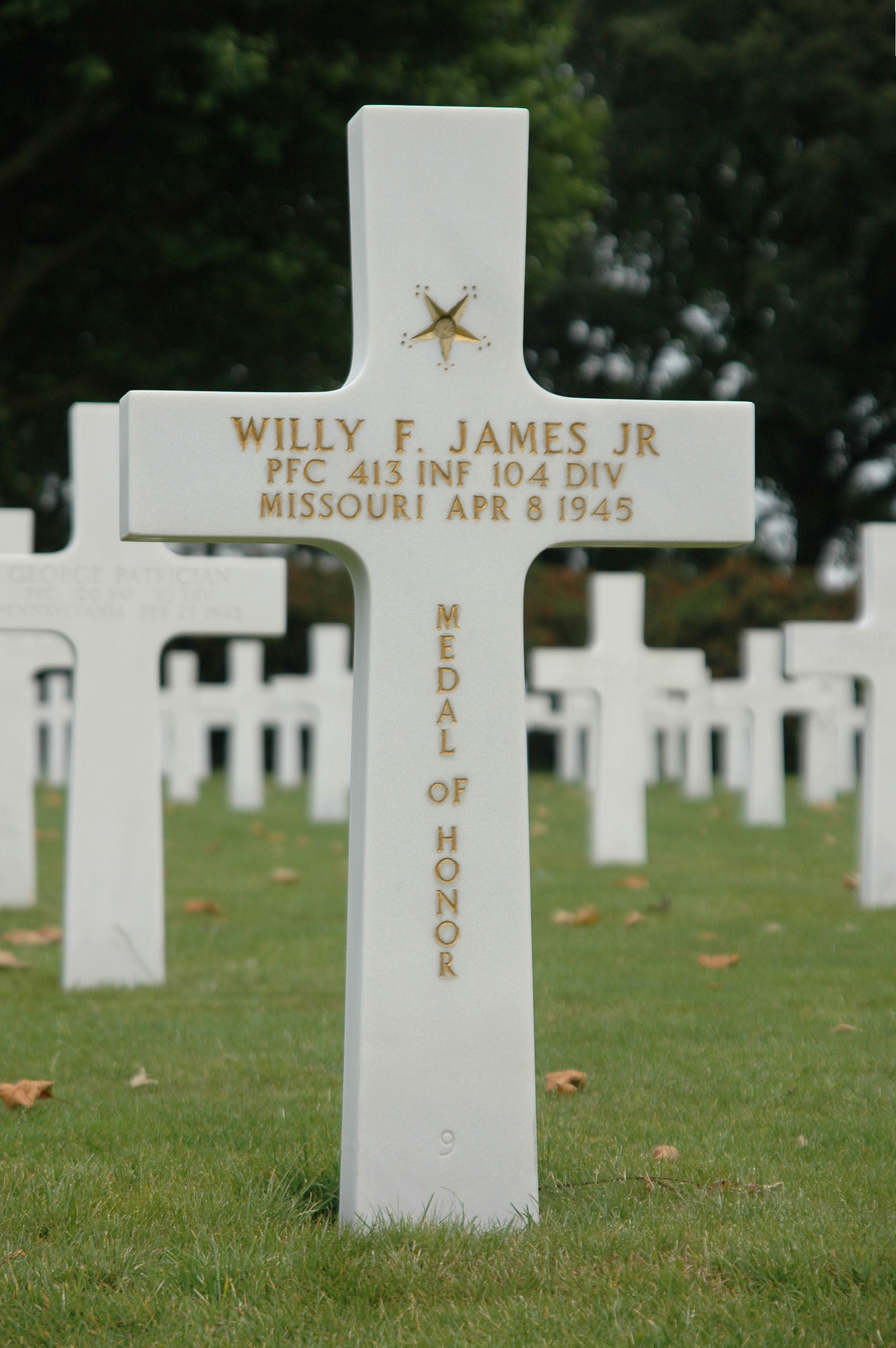
- Grave at Netherlands American Cemetery
- Born: March 18, 1920; Kansas City, Missouri, U.S.
- Died: April 8, 1945 (aged 25) near Lippoldsberg, Nazi Germany
- Burial place: Netherlands American Cemetery, Margraten
- Military career
- Allegiance: United States of America
- Branch: United States Army
- Service years: 1942–1945
- Rank: Private First Class
- Units: G Company, 413th Infantry Regiment, 104th Infantry Division
- Conflicts: World War II: Western Front; Western Allied invasion of Germany †
- Awards: Medal of Honor; Bronze Star; Purple Heart

Willy F. James Jr. (March 18, 1920 – April 8, 1945) was a United States Army private first class who was killed in action while running to the aid of his wounded platoon leader during World War II. In 1997, he was awarded the Medal of Honor, the nation's highest military decoration for valor, for his actions on April 7, 1945, in the vicinity of Lippoldsberg, Germany.

James and six other Black Americans who served in World War II were awarded the Medal of Honor on January 12, 1997. The Medal of Honor was posthumously presented to James by President Bill Clinton on January 13, 1997, during a Medals of Honor ceremony for the seven recipients at the White House in Washington, D.C. The seven recipients are the first and only Black Americans to be awarded the Medal of Honor for World War II.

== Biography ==
Willy James was born on March 18, 1920, in Kansas City, Missouri.

James enlisted in the U.S. Army on September 11, 1942. In April 1945, he was an infantry scout assigned to Company G, 413th Infantry Regiment, 104th Infantry Division ("Timberwolves"). On April 7, he was lead scout during a maneuver to secure an enemy bridgehead near Lippoldsberg, Germany. As his regiment crossed the Weser River, he was pinned down for more than an hour by enemy machine gun fire. After James returned to his platoon with his scouting observations, he helped to develop a new assault plan, designating targets in the new attack. Later, when James saw his platoon leader shot down by enemy snipers, he went to his lieutenant's aid and was himself killed by machine gun fire as he was making his way across open ground. On September 14, 1945, he was awarded the Distinguished Service Cross posthumously for extraordinary heroism.

Pfc. James was buried in the Netherlands American Cemetery and Memorial in the Dutch town of Margraten. His grave can be found in plot P, row 9, grave 9.

Medal of Honor

In the early 1990s, it was determined that Black soldiers had been denied consideration for the Medal of Honor (MOH) in World War II because of their race. In 1993, the U.S. Army had contracted Shaw University in Raleigh, North Carolina, to research and determine if there was racial disparity in the review process for recipients of the MOH. The study commissioned by the U.S. Army, described systematic racial discrimination in the criteria for awarding decorations during World War II. After an exhaustive review of files, the study recommended in 1996 that ten Black Americans who served in World War II be awarded the MOH. In October of that year, Congress passed legislation that would allow President Clinton to award the Medal of Honor to these former soldiers. Seven of the ten including Pfc. James were approved, and awarded the MOH (six had Distinguished Service Crosses revoked and upgraded to the MOH) on January 12, 1997. On January 13, 1997, President Clinton presented the MOH to the seven Black Americans; Pfc. James and five others were posthumously presented the MOH. Pfc. James's widow accepted the MOH on his behalf during the ceremony. Vernon Baker was the only living recipient of the medal at the time.

== Medal of Honor citation ==
James's Medal of Honor citation reads:

The President of the United States in the name of The Congress takes pride in presenting the Medal of Honor posthumously to

Private First Class Willy F. James, Jr.
United States Army

Citation:

For conspicuous gallantry and intrepidity at risk of his life above and beyond the call of duty: Private First Class Willy F. James, Jr. distinguished himself by extraordinary heroism at the risk of his own life on 7 April 1945 in the Weser River Valley, in the vicinity of Lippoldsberg, Germany. On 7 April 1945, Company G, 413th Infantry, fought its way across the Weser River in order to establish a crucial beachhead. The company then launched a fierce attack against the town of Lippoldsberg, possession of which was vital to securing and expanding the important bridgehead. Private First Class James was first scout of the lead squad in the assault platoon. The mission of the unit was to seize and secure a group of houses on the edge of town, a foothold from which the unit could launch an attack on the rest of the town. Far out in front, Private First Class James was the first to draw enemy fire. His platoon leader came forward to investigate, but poor visibility made it difficult for Private First Class James to point out enemy positions with any accuracy. Private First Class James volunteered to go forward to fully reconnoiter the enemy situation. Furious crossfire from enemy snipers and machineguns finally pinned down Private First Class James after making his way forward approximately 200 yards across open terrain. Lying in an exposed position for more than an hour, Private First Class James intrepidly observed the enemy's positions which were given away by the fire Private first class James was daringly drawing upon himself. Then, with utter indifference to his personal safety, in a storm of enemy small arms fire, Private First Class James made his way back more than 300 yards across open terrain under enemy observation to his platoon positions, and gave a full, detailed report on the enemy disposition. The unit worked out a new plan on maneuver based on Private First Class James' information. The gallant soldier volunteered to lead a squad in an assault on the key house in the group that formed the platoon objective. He made his way forward, leading his squad in the assault on the strongly held enemy positions in the building and designating targets accurately and continuously as he moved along. While doing so, Private First Class James saw his platoon leader shot down by enemy snipers. Hastily designating and coolly orienting a leader in his place, Private First Class James instantly went to the aid of his platoon leader, exposing himself recklessly to the incessant enemy fire. As he was making his way across open ground, Private First Class James was killed by a burst from an enemy machine gun. Private First Class James' extraordinary heroic action in the face of withering enemy fire provided the disposition of enemy troops to his platoon. Inspired to the utmost by Private First Class James' self-sacrifice, the platoon sustained the momentum of the assault and successfully accomplished its mission with a minimum of casualties. Private First Class James contributed very definitely to the success of his battalion in the vitally important combat operation of establishing and expanding a bridgehead over the Weser River. His fearless, self-assigned actions, far above and beyond the normal call of duty, exemplify the finest traditions of the American combat soldier and reflect with highest credit upon Private First Class James and the Armed Forces of the United States.

/S/ Bill Clinton

== Awards and decorations ==

Badge	Combat Infantryman Badge		
1st row	Medal of Honor		
2nd row	Bronze Star Medal	Purple Heart	Army Good Conduct Medal
3rd row	American Campaign Medal	European–African–Middle Eastern Campaign Medal with three campaign stars	World War II Victory Medal

== Namesake and honors ==
On November 4, 2001, the 7th U.S. Army Reserve Command (ARCOM) Reserve Center in Bamberg, Germany, was dedicated to the memory of PFC Willy F. James Jr. The center houses the 301st Rear Operations Center, the 345th Rear Area Operations Center, the 1172nd Movement Control Team, and their Regional Support Detachment.

== See also ==
- Vernon Baker
- Edward A. Carter Jr.
- John R. Fox
- Ruben Rivers
- Charles L. Thomas
- George Watson
- List of Medal of Honor recipients for World War II
- List of African American Medal of Honor recipients
