= Ben Sternberg =

United States Army general

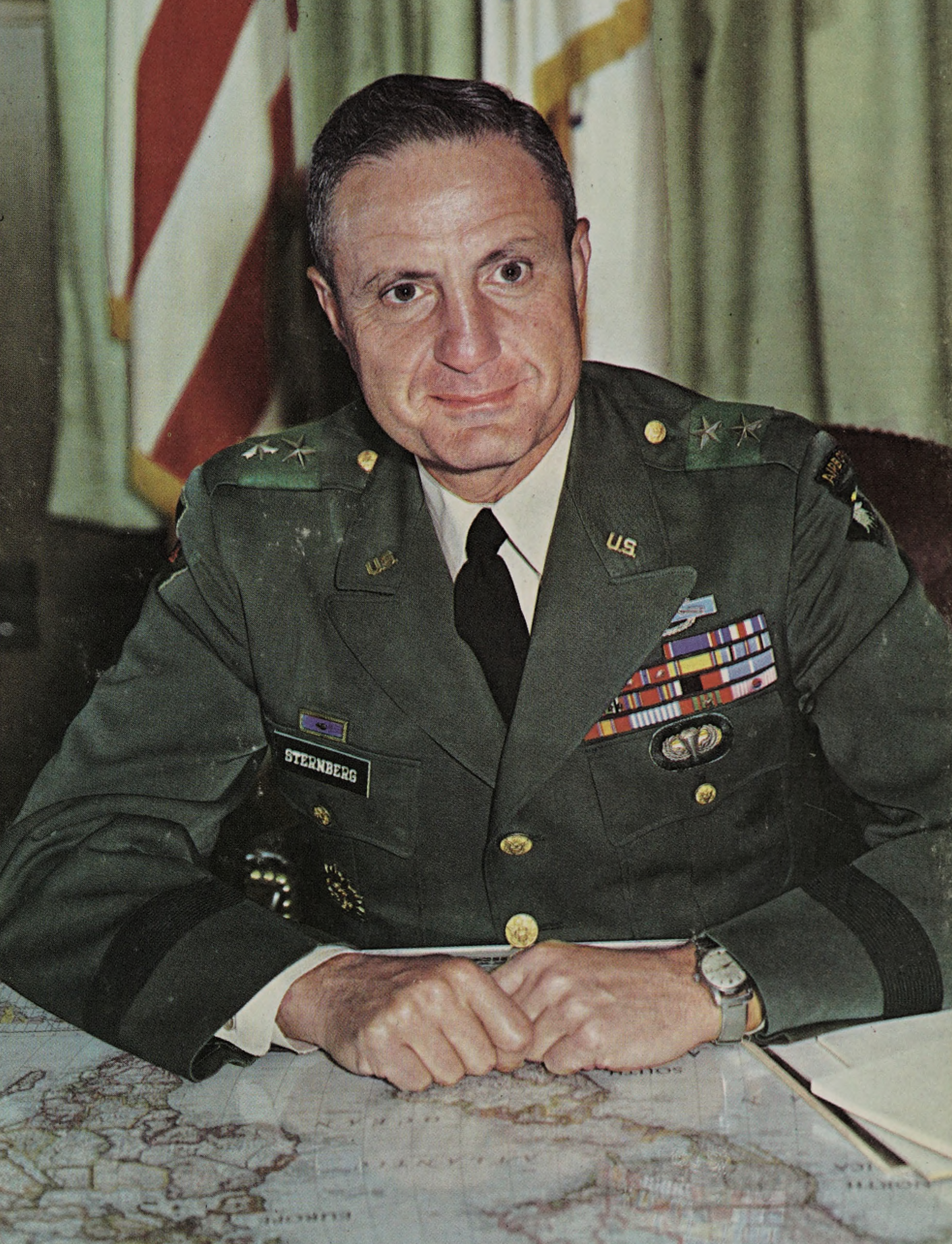
- Sternberg as 101st Airborne Division commander c. 1967
- Born: 28 February 1914; Starke, Florida, United States
- Died: 2 January 2004 (aged 89); Tripler Army Medical Center, Hawaii, United States
- Burial place: Arlington National Cemetery, Virginia, United States
- Military career
- Allegiance: United States
- Branch: United States Army
- Service years: 1930–1934, 1938–1971
- Rank: Major General
- Service number: 0-21286
- Unit: Infantry Branch
- Commands: 25th Infantry Division; 101st Airborne Division; 5th Regimental Combat Team; 2nd Battalion, 18th Infantry Regiment
- Conflicts: World War II; Vietnam War
- Awards: Distinguished Service Cross; Distinguished Service Medal; Silver Star Medal; Legion of Merit; Bronze Star Medal (3)

Major General Ben Sternberg (28 February 1914 – 2 January 2004) was a United States Army officer who served in World War II and the Vietnam War.

== Early life ==
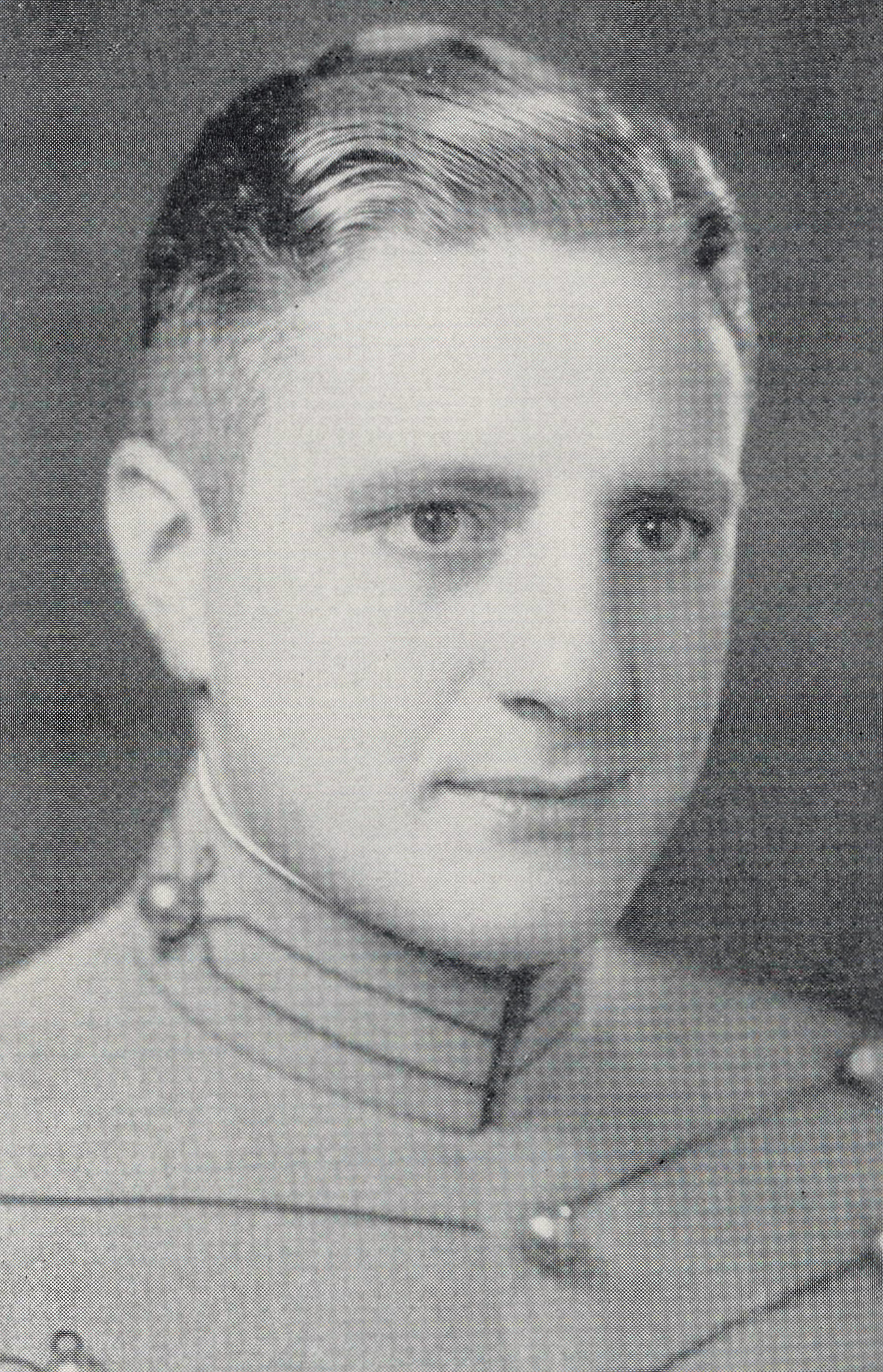
Sternberg as a United States Military Academy cadet c. 1938

Sternberg was born in Starke, Florida on 28 February 1914. He enlisted in the Florida National Guard on 2 July 1930 and attended the Marion Military Institute.

== Military career ==
Sternberg enlisted in the Regular Army on 2 July 1933 and was subsequently appointed to the United States Military Academy. He graduated from West Point with a B.S. degree on 14 June 1938 and was commissioned as a second lieutenant of infantry.

In March 1943 as a lieutenant colonel he commanded the 2nd Battalion, 18th Infantry Regiment, 1st Infantry Division in combat at the Battle of El Guettar, Tunisia. For his actions he was awarded the Distinguished Service Cross. During the Allied invasion of Sicily he led the 2/18th Infantry when it captured Ponte Olivo Airfield.

After the war, Sternberg graduated from the Command and General Staff College in 1948 and the Army War College in 1953. From 1948 to 1951, he taught tactics at West Point. From 1953 to 1954, Sternberg was deployed to Korea, commanding the 5th Regimental Combat Team and serving at the 8th Army headquarters.

From January 1964 to March 1996 he served as a J-1 Manpower and Personnel Directorate, Military Assistance Command, Vietnam. He was promoted to Major general on 1 February 1965.

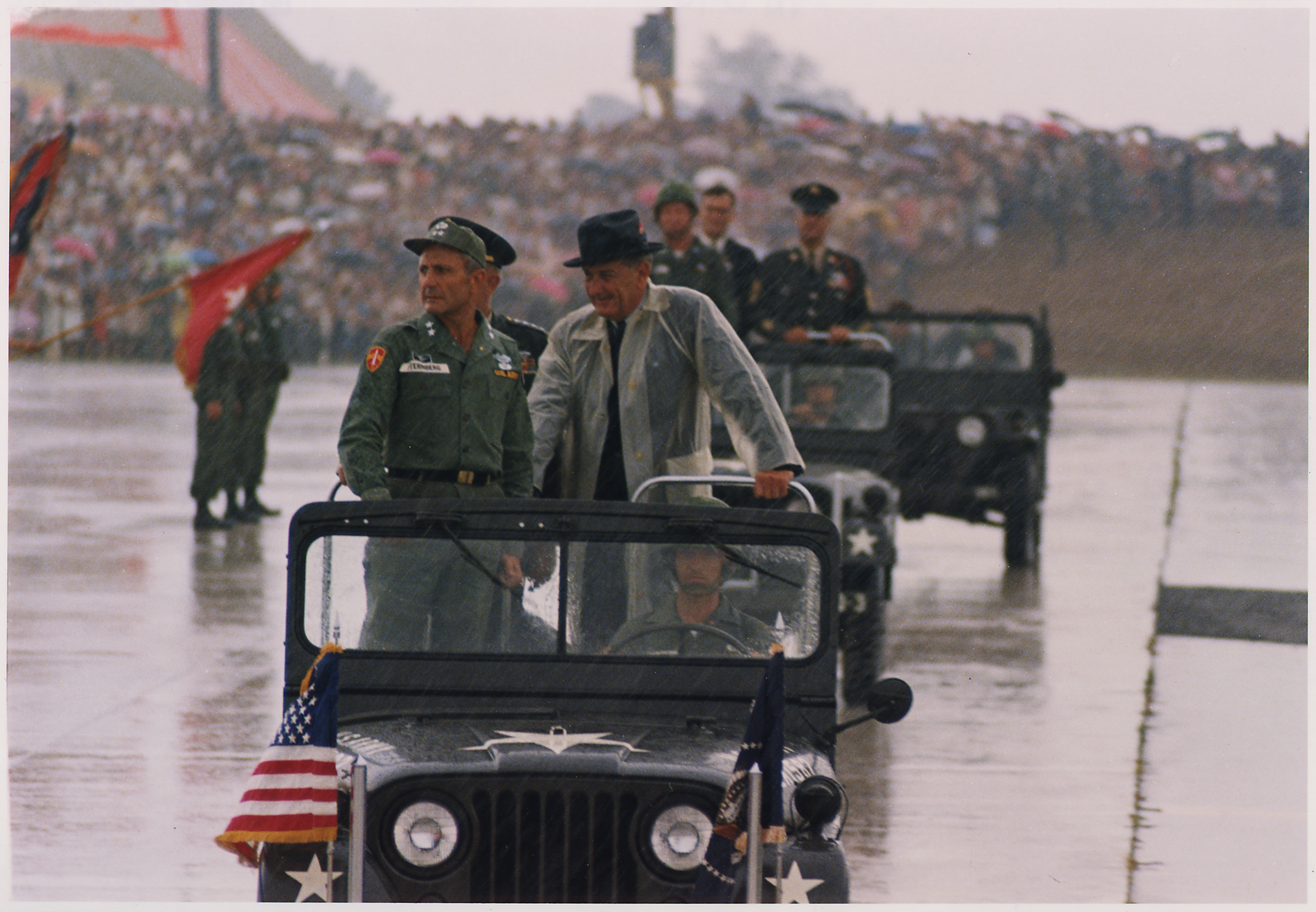
Sternberg with President Johnson at Fort Campbell, July 1966

From March 1966 to July 1967 he commanded the 101st Airborne Division. The Associated Press on 9 June 1966 reported him saying that the U.S. would need 500,000 more troops to seal off the borders of South Vietnam from infiltration, that Premier Nguyễn Cao Kỳ would probably have to step aside given the repercussions of the Buddhist Uprising and that a U.S. defeat in Vietnam was a possibility. On 23 July 1966 he escorted President Lyndon B. Johnson on an inspection of the division.

In 1971 he commanded the 25th Infantry Division.

His final assignment was as commanding general U.S. Army, Hawaii.

== Later life ==
He retired from the U.S. Army in Hawaii. He died on 2 January 2004 at Tripler Army Medical Center, Hawaii and was buried at Arlington National Cemetery.

== Decorations ==
His decorations include the Distinguished Service Cross, the Distinguished Service Medal, the Silver Star, the Legion of Merit and three awards of the Bronze Star Medal.
