= Walter J. Will =

United States Army Medal of Honor recipient

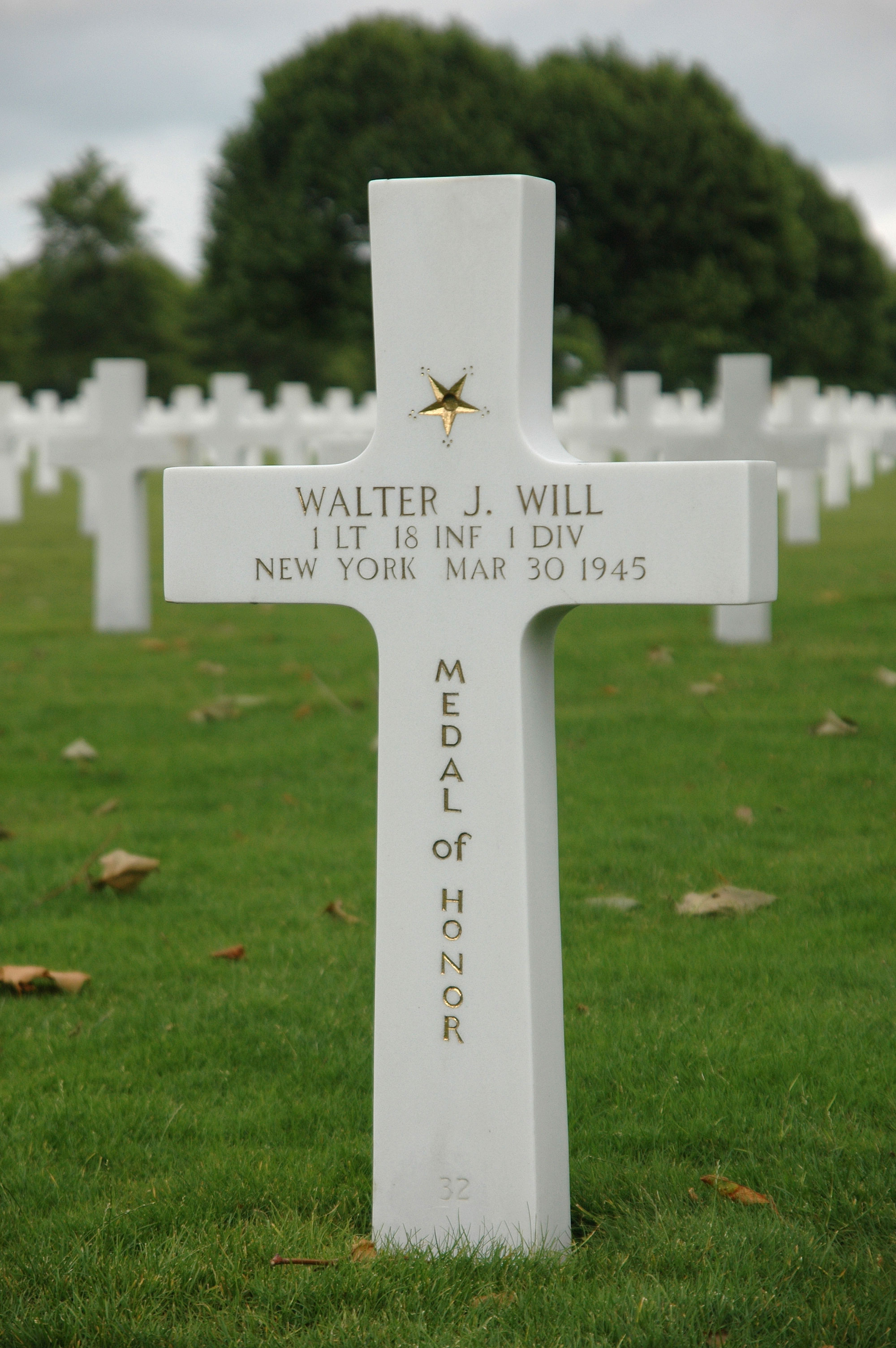
- Grave at Netherlands American Cemetery
- Born: March 19, 1922; Pittsburgh, Pennsylvania, US
- Died: March 30, 1945; Eisern, Germany
- Burial place: Netherlands American Cemetery and Memorial, Margraten, the Netherlands
- Military career
- Allegiance: United States
- Branch: United States Army
- Service years: 1940–1945
- Rank: First Lieutenant
- Units: 18th Infantry Regiment, 1st Infantry Division
- Conflicts: World War II
- Awards: Medal of Honor

Walter J. Will (19 March 1922 – 30 March 1945) was a United States Army officer and a recipient of the United States military's highest decoration—the Medal of Honor—for his actions in World War II.

Will joined the Army from West Winfield, New York in December 1940 and by 30 March 1945 was serving as a first lieutenant in Company K, 18th Infantry Regiment, 1st Infantry Division. During a firefight on that day near Eisern, Germany, he rescued three wounded men, single-handedly disabled two German machine gun nests and led his squad in the capture of two others, all despite his injuries. Mortally wounded while leading a charge on the enemy, Will was awarded the Medal of Honor posthumously seven months later, on 17 October 1945. He is buried at the Netherlands American Cemetery in Margraten, South Limburg, the Netherlands.

== Medal of Honor citation ==
First Lieutenant Will's official Medal of Honor citation reads:

He displayed conspicuous gallantry during an attack on powerful enemy positions. He courageously exposed himself to withering hostile fire to rescue 2 wounded men and then, although painfully wounded himself, made a third trip to carry another soldier to safety from an open area. Ignoring the profuse bleeding of his wound, he gallantly led men of his platoon forward until they were pinned down by murderous flanking fire from 2 enemy machine guns. He fearlessly crawled alone to within 30 feet of the first enemy position, killed the crew of 4 and silenced the gun with accurate grenade fire. He continued to crawl through intense enemy fire to within 20 feet of the second position where he leaped to his feet, made a lone, ferocious charge and captured the gun and its 9-man crew. Observing another platoon pinned down by 2 more German machine guns, he led a squad on a flanking approach and, rising to his knees in the face of direct fire, coolly and deliberately lobbed 3 grenades at the Germans, silencing 1 gun and killing its crew. With tenacious aggressiveness, he ran toward the other gun and knocked it out with grenade fire. He then returned to his platoon and led it in a fierce, inspired charge, forcing the enemy to fall back in confusion. 1st Lt. Will was mortally wounded in this last action, but his heroic leadership, indomitable courage, and unflinching devotion to duty live on as a perpetual inspiration to all those who witnessed his deeds.

== Commemoration ==
In April 1944, the U.S. Army took delivery of the "freight and supply" ship U.S. Army Lt. Walter J. Will (FS-244), which was named for Will. In November 1948, the Army transferred her to the fleet of the United States Department of the Interior's Fish and Wildlife Service, in which she served as MV Dennis Winn.

== See also ==
- List of Medal of Honor recipients
- List of Medal of Honor recipients for World War II
