= Carlton W. Barrett =

United States Army Medal of Honor recipient (1919–1986)

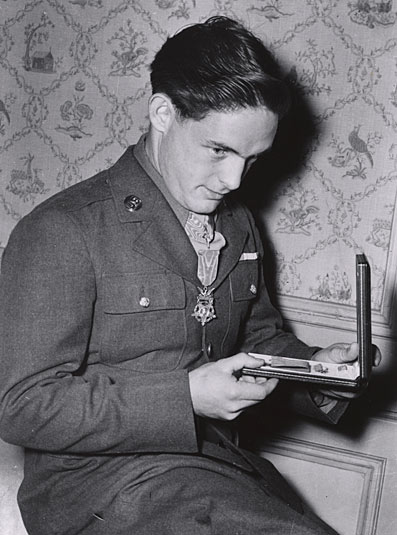
- Born: November 24, 1919; Fulton, New York, US
- Died: May 3, 1986 (aged 66); Napa, California, US
- Burial place: Chapel of the Chimes Cemetery Napa, California
- Military career
- Allegiance: United States of America
- Branch: United States Army
- Service years: 1940 – 1945, 1947 – 1963
- Rank: Staff Sergeant
- Unit: 18th Infantry Regiment
- Conflicts: World War II: Normandy landings
- Awards: Medal of Honor; Bronze Star Medal

Carlton William Barrett (November 24, 1919 – May 3, 1986), a native of Fulton, New York, was a United States Army soldier who received the Medal of Honor for heroism on Omaha Beach near Saint-Laurent-sur-Mer, France on June 6, 1944, during the Normandy landings (World War II).

== Military service ==
Barrett joined the United States Army from Albany, New York, in October 1940. He was a member of the 18th Infantry, 1st Infantry Division. Barrett was one of four Medal of Honor recipients on D-Day, June 6, 1944.

According to British journalist Alex Kershaw, at the time he made his enormous contribution to Allied success on D-Day, “24-year-old Private Carlton Barrett [was] just 5 feet 4 inches tall and tipping the scales at 125 pounds”.

Barrett was discharged from the Army in July 1945, and worked for the Bureau of Internal Revenue before reenlisting in May 1947. He served until June 1963, retiring with the rank of Staff Sergeant.

== Retirement ==
Barrett left the military in 1963, while stationed at the Army and Air Force Recruiting Station in Culver City, California. He and his wife Josephine (whom he had married in 1947) remained in California, with their two children. His right leg was amputated in 1984 due to his war injuries, according to the Kansas City Times.

== Death ==
Carlton W. Barrett died on May 3, 1986, while residing at the California Veterans Home in Yountville, California. He is buried at Chapel of the Chimes Cemetery in Napa, California.

== Medal of Honor citation ==
For gallantry and intrepidity at the risk of his life above and beyond the call of duty on 6 June 1944, in the vicinity of St. Laurent-sur-Mer, France. On the morning of D-day Pvt. Barrett, landing in the face of extremely heavy enemy fire, was forced to wade ashore through neck-deep water. Disregarding the personal danger, he returned to the surf again and again to assist his floundering comrades and save them from drowning. Refusing to remain pinned down by the intense barrage of small-arms and mortar fire poured at the landing points, Pvt. Barrett, working with fierce determination, saved many lives by carrying casualties to an evacuation boat lying offshore. In addition to his assigned mission as guide, he carried dispatches the length of the fire-swept beach; he assisted the wounded; he calmed the shocked; he arose as a leader in the stress of the occasion. His coolness and his dauntless daring courage while constantly risking his life during a period of many hours had an inestimable effect on his comrades and is in keeping with the highest traditions of the U.S. Army.

His medal ceremony took place at Paris, France on 17 November 1944, and he was decorated by Lt. Gen. John C. H. Lee, Deputy Theater Commander of the European Theater of Operations and Commanding General, Communication Zone, ETO.

== Awards and decorations ==

Combat Infantryman Badge
| Medal of Honor | Bronze Star Medal | Army Good Conduct Medal with bronze clasp with five knots |
| American Defense Service Medal | American Campaign Medal | European-African-Middle Eastern Campaign Medal with Arrowhead device, one silver and three bronze campaign stars |
| World War II Victory Medal | National Defense Service Medal with bronze service star | French Croix de Guerre with Palm |
Presidential Unit Citation with one bronze oak leaf cluster

== See also ==
- List of Medal of Honor recipients for World War II
