= Battle of Troina =

1943 battle in Sicily during World War II

Coordinates: 37°47′N 14°36′E

- Part of the Allied invasion of Sicily of World War II
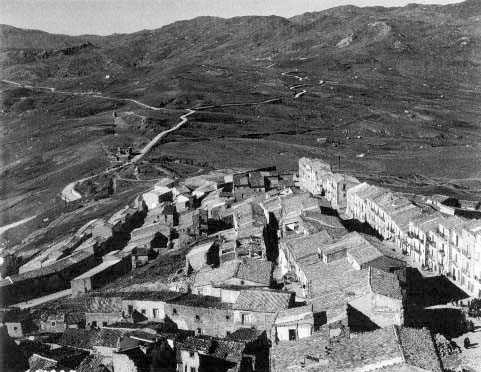
- Troina during World War II
| Date | July 31, 1943 – August 6, 1943 |
| Location | Troina, Sicily, Italy |
| Result | Allied victory |

Belligerents
| United States; Free France | Germany; Italy |

Commanders and leaders
| (United States) George S. Patton (United States) Omar Bradley (United States) Terry de la Mesa Allen Sr. (United States) Manton Eddy | (Nazi Germany) Hans-Valentin Hube (Nazi Germany) Eberhard Rodt (Kingdom of Italy) Ottorino Schreiber (Kingdom of Italy) Giuseppe Romano |

The Battle of Troina was an important battle that took place between 31 July and 6 August 1943, as part of the Allied invasion of Sicily during World War II. Forces of the U.S. II Corps, part of the U.S. Seventh Army, under George S. Patton, engaged in fierce fighting around the town of Troina in the central portion of Sicily along the Caronie Mountains. The battle focused around the numerous hills and mountains surrounding Troina which the German and Italian forces had heavily fortified and used as bases for direct and indirect fire.

== Background ==
On 29 July 1943, after 20 days of combat, it was clear to both the Allied and German high commands that Sicily was lost and 80,000-100,000 American and British troops would break through the German and Italian Etna Line. The US 7th Army commander, Lieutenant General George S. Patton Jr, had ordered the US 1st and 9th Infantry Divisions to be moved into the valley to attack the city of Troina. Generals Omar Bradley (the commander of US II Corps) and Patton ordered the two divisions be pulled out of the line once Troina fell. Troina was considered one of the main anchors of the Etna Line. It was defended by the 15th Panzer Grenadier Division commanded by Generalleutnant Eberhard Rodt and four battalions of General di Divisione Giuseppe Romano's 28th Infantry Division Aosta. The Axis forces, in deep trenches, had a clear view of the oncoming Allied soldiers, who had little cover.

=== Order of Battle ===
==== Allied Forces ====
- U.S. II Corps (Lieutenant General Omar Bradley)
  - 1st Infantry Division (Major General Terry de la Mesa Allen)
    - 16th Infantry Regiment
    - 18th Infantry Regiment
    - 26th Infantry Regiment
  - 9th Infantry Division (Major General Manton Eddy)
    - 39th Infantry Regiment
    - 60th Infantry Regiment
  - 4th Tabor of Moroccan Goums
  - 91st Cavalry Reconnaissance Squadron

==== Axis Forces ====
- 15th Panzergrenadier Division (Generalmajor Eberhard Rodt)
- 26th Infantry Division "Assietta" (Generale Di Divisione Ottorino Schreiber)
- 28th Infantry Division "Aosta" (Generale di Divisione Giuseppe Romano)

== Battle ==
The Battle of Troina began on 31 July, when the Germans repelled an advance by the 39th Infantry, a 9th Infantry Division formation temporarily attached to the 1st Infantry Division, commanded by Major General Terry Allen. This setback forced Bradley and Allen to orchestrate a massive assault. Early on the first day of fighting, Sergeant Gerry H. Kisters of the 91st Cavalry was awarded the Medal of Honor for silencing two machine gun positions. Over the next six days the men of the 1st Infantry Division, together with elements of the 9th Division, a French Moroccan infantry battalion, 165 artillery pieces (divided among 9 battalions of 105-mm howitzers, 6 battalions of 155-mm howitzers, and 1 battalion of 155-mm "Long Tom" guns), and numerous Allied aircraft, were locked in combat with Troina's tenacious defenders. Control of key hilltop positions changed hands often, with the Germans and Italians launching more than two dozen counterattacks during the week-long battle. During one Italian counterattack, Lieutenant-Colonel Giuseppe Gianquinto's 1st Battalion, 5th Regiment of the 'Aosta' managed to take 40 American prisoners.

The experience of Colonel John Bowen's 26th Infantry Regiment was fairly typical of the action around Troina. The 26th's assignment was to outflank Troina by seizing Monte Basilio two miles north of the town. From here, the regiment would be positioned to cut the Axis line of retreat. Bowen moved his soldiers forward on 2 August supported by the fire of 1 battalion of 155-mm howitzers, 4 battalions of 105-mm howitzers and 4 "Long Tom" batteries. Despite this weighty arsenal, German artillery fire and difficult terrain limited the regiment's advance to half a mile. The next morning one of the regiment's battalions lost its bearings in the hilly terrain and wandered around ineffectually for the remainder of the day. A second battalion reached Monte Basilio with relatively little difficulty, only to be pounded by Axis artillery fire directed from neighboring hills. The 115th Panzergrenadier Regiment launched a failed offensive to retake the mountains; they were repelled by machine gun fire.

For the next two days the men on Monte Basilio were pinned down by artillery fire. Determined to hold Troina for as long as possible, the Germans reacted strongly to the threat the 26th Regiment posed to their line of communications. Axis pressure practically cut off the men on Monte Basilio from the rest of the 1st Division, and attempts to resupply them from the air were only partially successful. By 5 August food and ammunition were low and casualties had greatly depleted the regiment, with one company mustering only seventeen men effective for duty.

It was at this point that the German infantry attacked again, touching off another round of furious fighting. During the battle, Pvt. James W. Reese moved his mortar squad to a position from which he could effectively engage the advancing German infantry. The squad maintained a steady fire on the attackers until it began to run out of ammunition. With only three mortar rounds left, Reese ordered his crew to the rear while he advanced to a new position and knocked out a German machine gun with the last rounds. He then shouldered a rifle and continued to engage the enemy until he was killed by a barrage of hostile fire.

Through the efforts of men like Reese, the 26th Infantry held its position. The United States recognized Reese's heroism posthumously by awarding him the Medal of Honor.

The Germans evacuated Troina later that night. Hard pressed by American forces throughout the Troina sector and unable to dislodge the 26th Regiment from its position threatening his line of retreat, General Hube withdrew the badly damaged 15th Panzer Grenadier Division toward Randazzo. As the 9th Infantry Division took up the pursuit, the 1st Division retired for rest.

While the 1st Infantry Division battled for possession of Troina, Major General Lucian Truscott's 3rd Division encountered opposition at San Fratello, the northern end of the Etna Line. Here the 29th Panzer Grenadier Division along with the Italian 26th Assietta Infantry Division, that had been allocated the most exposed section of the line, had entrenched itself on a ridge overlooking the coastal highway. Truscott made repeated attempts to crack the San Fratello position beginning on 3 August, but failed to gain much ground. The strength of the German position prompted him to try to outflank it by an amphibious end run. On the night of 7–8 August, while the 3rd Battalion, 15th Infantry Regiment, and 3rd Battalion, 30th Infantry Regiment, seized a key hill along the San Fratello Line, Lieutenant Colonel Lyle Bernard led the 2nd Battalion, 30th Infantry Regiment, reinforced by two batteries from the 58th Armored Field Artillery Battalion, a platoon of medium tanks, and a platoon of combat engineers, in an amphibious landing at Sant'Agata, a few miles behind San Fratello. The amphibious assault force achieved complete surprise and quickly blocked the coastal highway. Unfortunately, the Germans had selected that night to withdraw from San Fratello, without advising the Italian defenders, and most of their troops had already retired past Bernard's position by the time the Americans arrived. Nevertheless, the 3rd Infantry Division's combined land and sea offensive took over 1,000 prisoners.

== Aftermath ==
Allied pressure had broken the Etna Line, but there would be no lightning exploitation of the victory. Taking maximum advantage of the constricting terrain and armed with a seemingly inexhaustible supply of mines, General Hube withdrew his XIV Panzer Corps in orderly phases toward Messina.

Patton made a second bid to trap the 29th Panzer Grenadier Division on 11 August, when he sent Colonel Bernard on another amphibious end run, this time at Brolo. Once again Bernard's men achieved complete surprise, but they soon came under heavy pressure as the German units trapped by the landing tried to batter their way out. Bernard's group proved too small to keep the Germans bottled up, and by the time Truscott linked up with the landing force, the bulk of the 29th Panzer Grenadier Division had escaped.

Because of the high casualties from the battle General Bradley had Allen and his subordinate Teddy Roosevelt Jr. relieved of command and Clarence R. Huebner took command of the 1st Infantry Division.

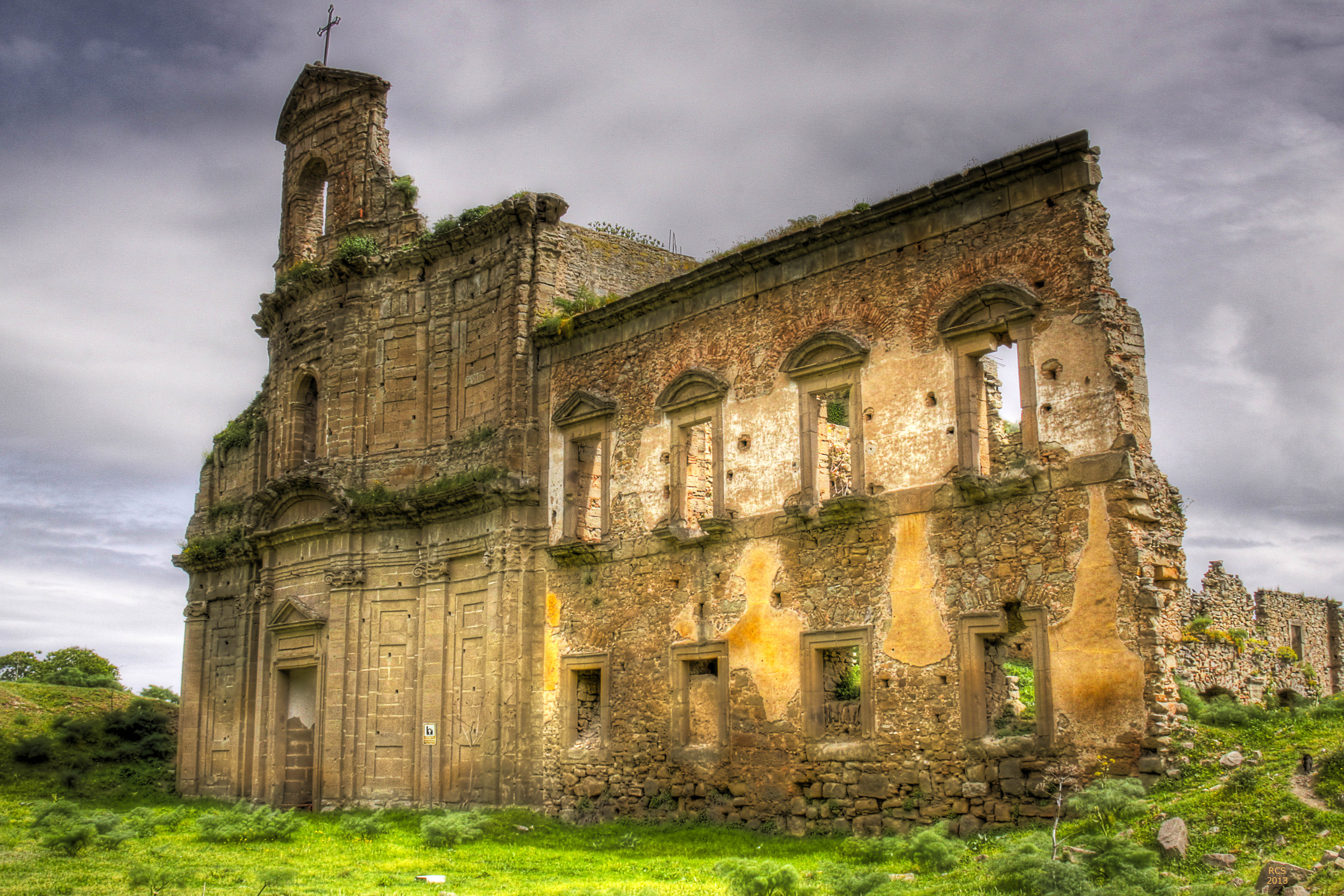
Bombed church from World War II below Troina
