= Warner Barracks =

Former barracks in Germany

Coordinates: 49.907°N 10.925°E

- Bamberg, Bavaria, in Germany

Site information
- Operator: United States Army

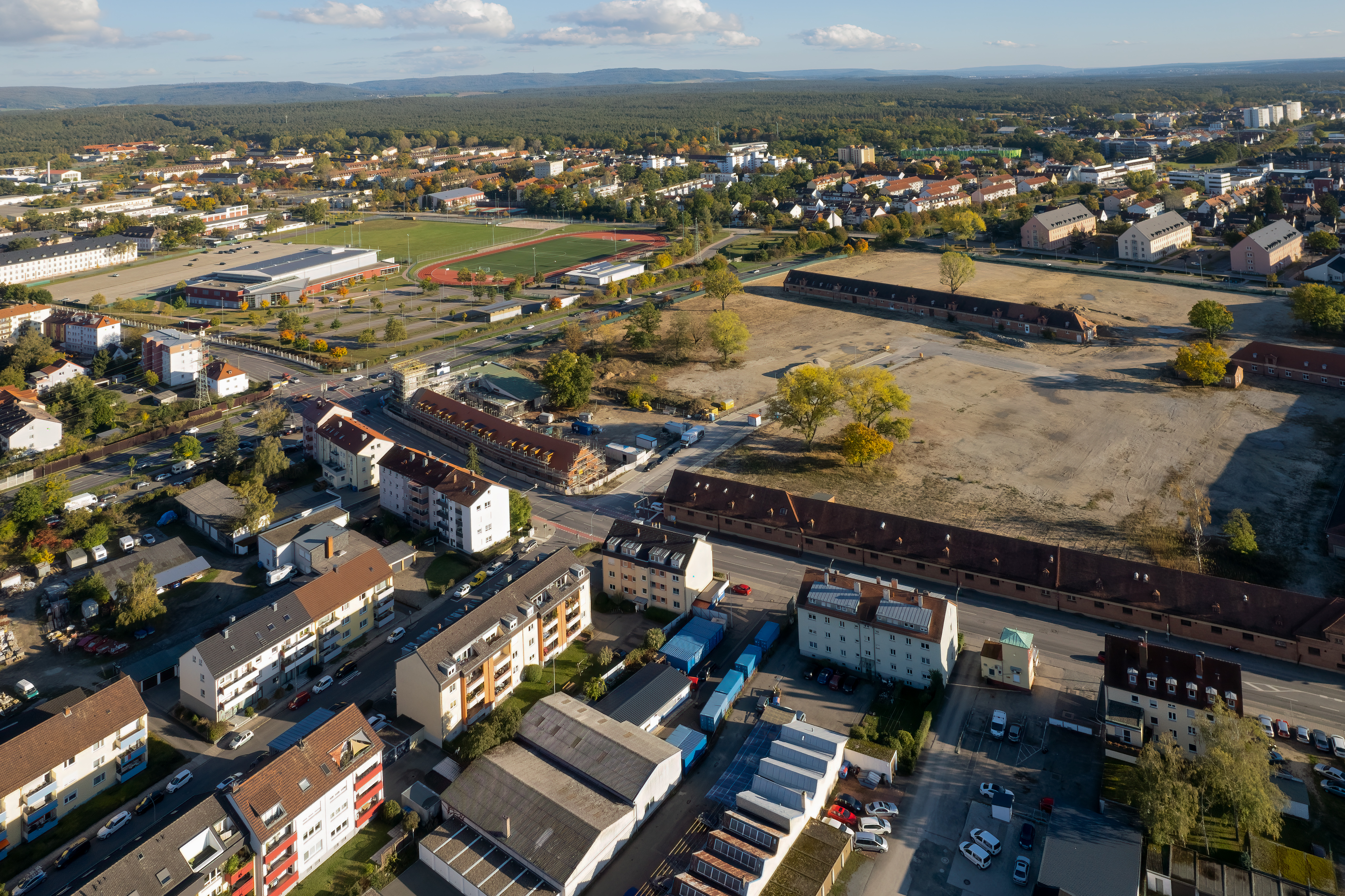
Warner Barracks site in 2021

Warner Barracks circa 1958

Warner Barracks was a United States Army military base in the city of Bamberg, Bavaria, southern Germany. The base had been occupied by U.S. forces since the end of World War II. Elements of the U.S. Army's 3rd Infantry Division and 45th Infantry Division entered the town on 13 and 14 April 1945. But before the war, this military site had a colorful history that goes hand-in-hand with Bamberg's history, which began in the 10th century. Bamberg was originally a fort on a hill. The view enabled soldiers of the time to watch the city and guard it against possible attacks. In 973, the Duke of Bavaria gained control of the fort. The city and fort fell under Swedish Protestants' control during the Thirty Years War when the Swedes engulfed the city and took it forcibly in 1634.

In 1891, Warner Barracks, later known as "Lagarde Kaserne", was built by the Royal Bavarian Army as an infantry barracks. Many of the buildings to the west were constructed around the start of the 20th century, and several of these are classified at historical monuments. From World War I to World War II, almost every branch of the German Army was stationed here, the most famous being the 35th Tank Regiment and the German 17th Cavalry Regiment. In 1917, the present Muna area was established and, in 1928, the present airfield was added. After 1933, the forces here were augmented with the addition of the 79th Artillery Regiment, and in 1936, Warner Barracks I, the eastern portion of the military base, was constructed as "Artillery Kaserne".

Prior to World War II, almost every branch of the German Army was stationed at Warner Barracks at some time, the most elite being the 35th Armor and the 17th Cavalry Regiments. The cavalry was composed of noblemen who were wealthy and had their own riding school. Claus von Stauffenberg, who was known for 20 July plot of 1944 to assassinate Adolf Hitler, served in the cavalry regiment; it was his family's traditional regiment. The stables and school occupied the PX, Commissary, and community engineering areas. After World War II, the headquarters of the U.S. Constabulary, created to occupy Germany, was located in Bamberg. The Constabulary was a highly mobile unit made up of the 26th Infantry Regiment and the 1st Infantry Division. The unit was responsible for patrolling the American occupied quarter of Germany.

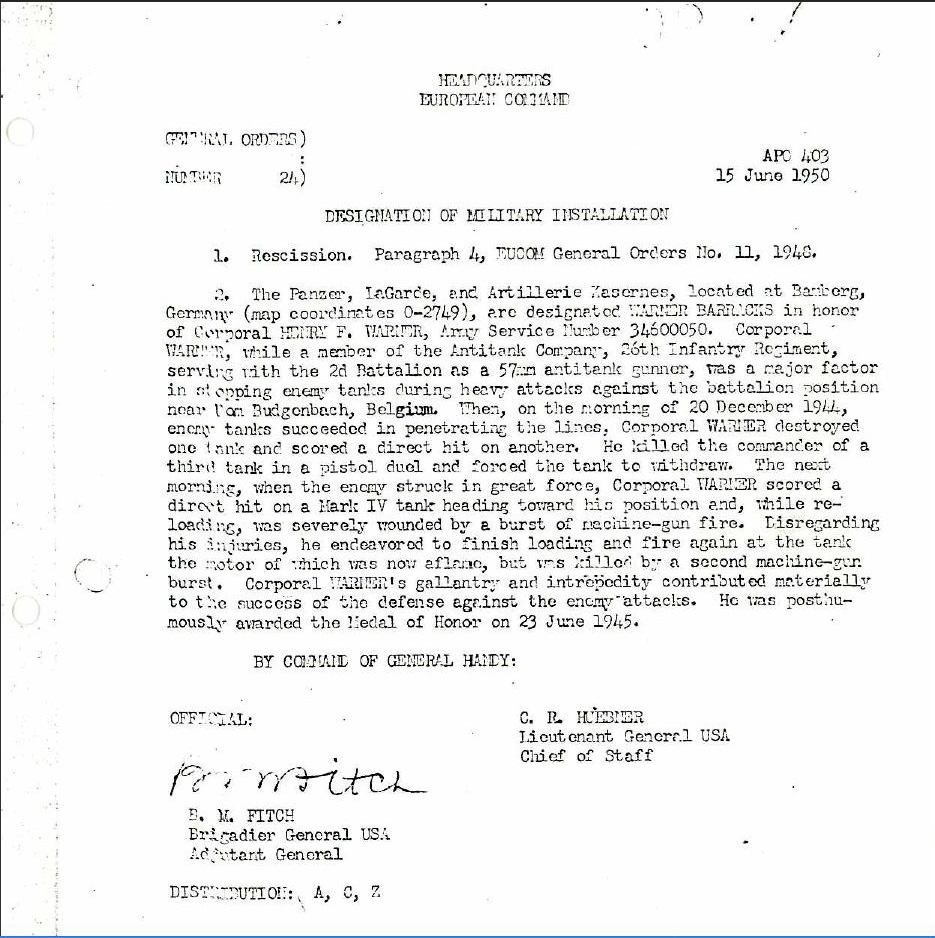
1950 designation of Warner Barracks; named after Cpl. Henry F. Warner

In 1955 the 10th Infantry Division, by Operation Gyroscope, replaced the 1st Infantry Division at Warner Barracks. In June 1948, the Soviets imposed the Berlin Blockade changing the United States' role in Germany from occupier to defender. The Constabulary was eventually phased out. The current Warner Barracks complex was appropriated in 1950 by U.S. forces and renamed in honor of Cpl. Henry F. Warner. Warner was killed in action on December 21, 1944 after his heroic anti-tank actions in Bütgenbach, Belgium. He was posthumously awarded the Medal of Honor six months later, on June 23, 1945.

In 1951, development for long-term use of the post began. A dispensary, dental clinic, schools, a PX, gymnasiums and an education center were established. The post commander was always the senior officer of the infantry brigade until 1970 when Bamberg became an official U.S. Army Europe community with a general officer appointed as post commander.

In 1991, the Bamberg military community became the 279th Base Support Battalion, under the 99th Area Support Group in Nürnberg. In 1993, it joined the 98th Area Support Group, based in Würzburg.

In 2000, the 38th Personnel Services Battalion (PSB) headquarters moved to Warner Barracks from Giebelstadt.

Over the years, the installation was a sub-community of All the installations located in Frankfurt, Nürnberg, and Würzburg. U.S. Army Garrison Bamberg is subordinate to United States Army Installation Management Command – Europe and is an indirect report garrison under USAG Ansbach.

On September 12, 2014, the U.S. Army Garrison Bamberg hosted a joint American-German ceremony to officially close Warner Barracks and turn it over to the German government.

== Muna Depot ==
The Bamberg Ammunition Plant ("Muna", from German Munitionsanstalt) was originally built in 1917 for the production of ammunition for World War I. During World War II, it was reactivated and expanded, with 67 buildings, mostly ammunition bunkers, in 1945. Each of the bunkers had a storage capacity for 60 tons of explosives.

In April 1945, only 10 days after the U.S. forces entered Bamberg, the 2nd Platoon, and 33rd Chemical Decontamination Company captured the ammunition plant, and placed guards at the facility. The depot was cleared, but it was decided that the facility should remain under U.S. command. An additional chemical shell dump was closed in Bayreuth on 5 May by the 61st Chemical Depot Company. Chemical supplies from this depot were transported to Bamberg.

During the first year of occupation, a total of 12,000 tons of ammunition was removed from the Bamberg Ammunition Depot. 10,000 tons of this ammunition were shipped to U.S. depots, while 2,000 tons were destroyed.

After all German ammunition was removed from the Muna, the U.S. forces used the facilities for ammunition storage. Personnel at the depot provided technical and operational supervision for the Ordnance Ammunition Companies that were stationed in the installation and in the sub-depot Breitenguessbach after 1947. The sub-depot at Breitenguessbach, which was utilized for the storage of engineered high explosives and mines, was closed 15 March 1951. The Oberdachstetten Explosives Depot also fell under Bamberg's operational control; this was closed in 1947 after the disposal of all the captured enemy ammunition.

== U.S. Army units stationed in Bamberg ==
- 1st Bn. 54th Infantry
- 2nd Bn. 52nd Infantry
- 2nd Bn. 54th Infantry
- 3rd Bn. 35th Armor
- 279th Base Support Battalion
- 1st Infantry Division Artillery (United States) (DIVARTY)
- 1st Battalion, 6th Field Artillery Regiment (155mm Self-Propelled)
- 1st Battalion, 33rd Field Artillery
- 1st Infantry Division Engineering Brigade
- 82nd Engineer Battalion (Combat Engineers)
- 54th Engineering Battalion
- 7th Corps Support Group
- 71st Corps Support Battalion
- 345th Support Company
- 317th Maintenance Company
- 240th Quartermaster Company
- 38th Personal Service Battalion
- 793rd Military Police Battalion
- 630th Military Police Company
- 560th Military Police Company
- 522nd Military Police Platoon
- 200th TAMMC
- 30th Movement Control Team
- 1172nd Movement Control Team
- Bavaria Dist. 2nd CID
- 106th Finance Support Team
- 1st Infantry Division Band
- 38th Postal Detachment
- 1st Infantry Division (STC)
- 201st FSB (CO B)
- 701st MST (CO D)
- 301st Rear Operations Center
- 1st Battalion, 2nd Aviation
- 71st Ordnance Detachment
- 3rd Brigade of the 1st Armored Division from 1971 to 1991
- 3rd Infantry Division
- 4th Armored Division
- 2nd and 11th Armored Cavalry Regiments
- 5th Missile Battalion, 39th Artillery (Lance Missile)
- 2nd Battalion, 78th Fild Artillery (155mm Self Propelled)
- 2nd Battalion, 35th Artillery (155mm towed guns)
- 1st Battalion, 75th Artillery (8" Self-Propelled Artillery)
- 6th Battalion, 10th Artillery (175mm Self-Propelled Artillery - converted to M110 A2 8" Self Propelled Howitzers in early 1979)
- 3rd Battalion, 7th Air Defense Artillery (Charlie Company- HQ in Sweinfurt)
- 5th Battalion, 2nd Air Defense Artillery (Avenger) (inactivated in 1997)
- 4th Battalion, 319th Airborne Field Artillery
- 173rd Special Troops Battalion
- 3rd Platoon, 501st Military Police Company. 1971-1991

== DoDDS/DoDEA schools in Bamberg ==
Three Department of Defense Education Activity (DoDEA, formerly known as DoDDS) schools were in Warner Barracks for families of those stationed there:

- Bamberg Elementary School
- Strullendorf Elementary School
- Bamberg American (Middle and) High School, which was open from 1980 to 2014
