= James W. Reese =

United States Army Medal of Honor recipient (1920–1943)

James William Reese
- Born: April 16, 1920; Chester, Pennsylvania, U.S.
- Died: August 5, 1943 (aged 23) near Troina, Sicily, Italy
- Burial place: Chester Rural Cemetery, Chester, Pennsylvania, U.S.
- Military career
- Allegiance: United States
- Branch: United States Army
- Service years: 1941–1943
- Rank: Private
- Units: 26th Infantry Regiment, 1st Infantry Division
- Conflicts: World War II: Sicily campaign; Battle of Troina †
- Awards: Medal of Honor

James William Reese (April 16, 1920 – August 5, 1943) was a United States Army soldier and a recipient of the United States military's highest decoration—the Medal of Honor—for his actions in World War II during the Battle of Troina in the Sicily campaign.

== Biography ==
Reese joined the Army from his birth city of Chester, Pennsylvania in November 1941, and by August 5, 1943, was serving as a private in the 26th Infantry Regiment, 1st Infantry Division. On that day, at Mt. Vassillio, Sicily, Reese led his mortar squad in a defense against an enemy counterattack. When the hostile fire intensified, he ordered his squad to fall back while he manned the weapon alone. After expending all the mortar ammunition, he continued in the fight with his rifle until being killed. He was posthumously awarded the Medal of Honor four months later, on December 17, 1943.

Reese, aged 23 at his death, was buried in Chester Rural Cemetery in Chester, Pennsylvania.

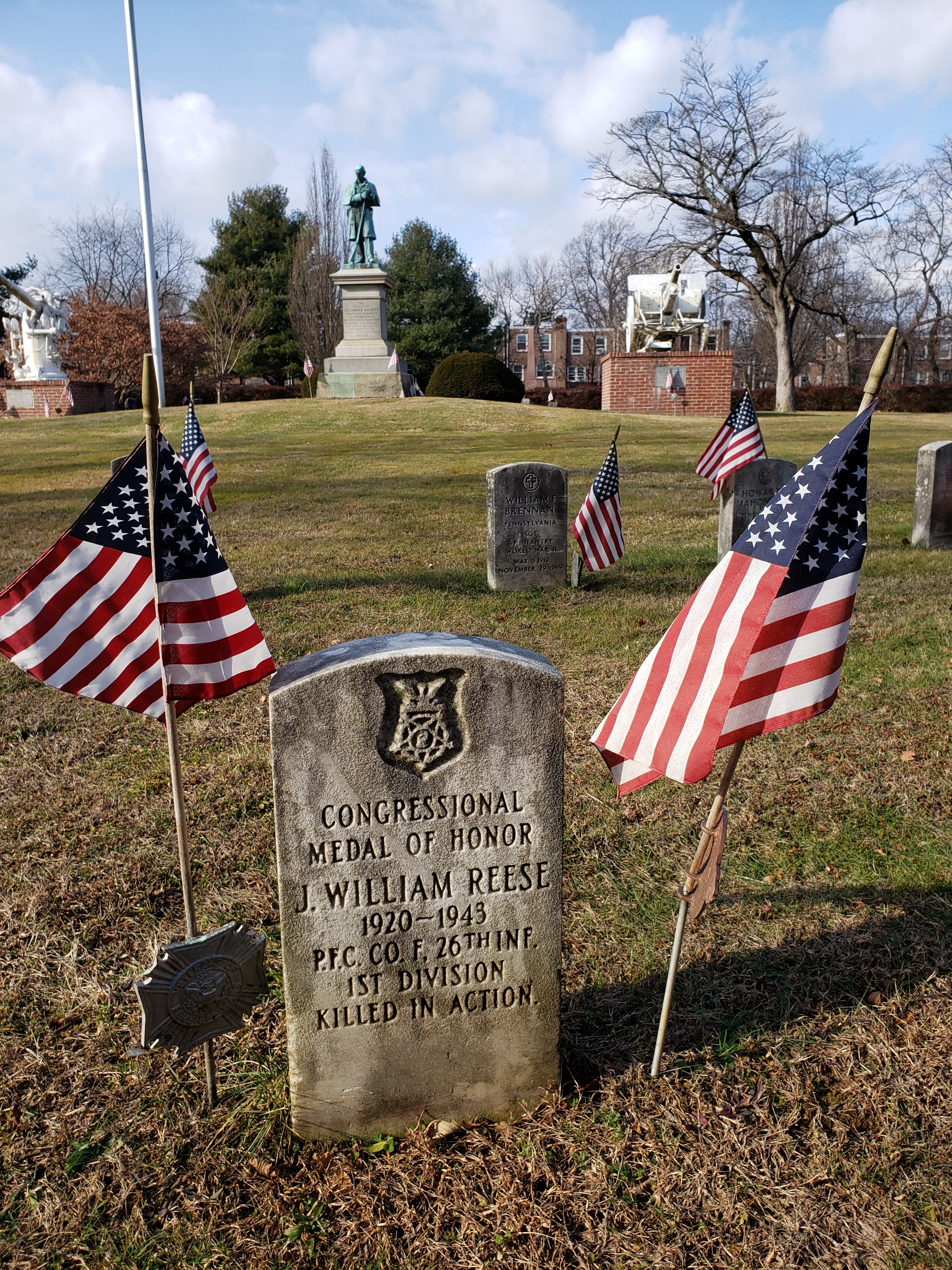
James W. Reese grave

After the Second World War, the Reese Barracks in Augsburg, Germany were named in his honor.

A United States Army Reserve Center in Upland, PA was named in his honor.

== Medal of Honor citation ==
Private Reese's official Medal of Honor citation reads:

For conspicuous gallantry and intrepidity at the risk of life, above and beyond the call of duty in action involving actual conflict with the enemy. When the enemy launched a counterattack which threatened the position of his company, Pvt. Reese, as the acting squad leader of a 60-mm. mortar squad, displaying superior leadership on his own initiative, maneuvered his squad forward to a favorable position, from which, by skillfully directing the fire of his weapon, he caused many casualties in the enemy ranks, and aided materially in repulsing the counterattack. When the enemy fire became so severe as to make his position untenable, he ordered the other members of his squad to withdraw to a safer position, but declined to seek safety for himself. So as to bring more effective fire upon the enemy, Pvt. Reese, without assistance, moved his mortar to a new position and attacked an enemy machinegun nest. He had only 3 rounds of ammunition but secured a direct hit with his last round, completely destroying the nest and killing the occupants. Ammunition being exhausted, he abandoned the mortar, seized a rifle and continued to advance, moving into an exposed position overlooking the enemy. Despite a heavy concentration of machinegun, mortar, and artillery fire, the heaviest experienced by his unit throughout the entire Sicilian campaign, he remained at this position and continued to inflict casualties upon the enemy until he was killed. His bravery, coupled with his gallant and unswerving determination to close with the enemy, regardless of consequences and obstacles which he faced, are a priceless inspiration to our armed forces.

== Awards and decorations ==
Private Reese received the following awards for his service

Badge	Combat Infantryman Badge		
1st row	Medal of Honor		Bronze Star Medal Retroactively Awarded, 1947
2nd row	Purple Heart with 1 Oak leaf cluster	Army Good Conduct Medal	American Defense Service Medal
3rd row	American Campaign Medal	European–African–Middle Eastern Campaign Medal with Arrowhead Device and 1 Campaign star	World War II Victory Medal

== See also ==
- List of Medal of Honor recipients
- List of Medal of Honor recipients for World War II
