= Henry F. Warner =

United States Army Medal of Honor recipient (1923–1944)

- Born: August 23, 1923; Troy, North Carolina, U.S.
- Died: December 21, 1944 (aged 21); Near Bütgenbach, Belgium
- Burial place: Southside Cemetery, Troy, North Carolina, U.S.
- Military career
- Branch: United States Army
- Service years: 1943–1944
- Rank: Corporal
- Service number: 34600050
- Units: 2d Battalion, 26th Infantry, 1st Infantry Division
- Campaigns: World War II; Northern France; Rhineland; Ardennes-Alsace †
- Awards: Medal of Honor; Purple Heart

Henry Fred Warner (August 23, 1923 – December 21, 1944) was a United States Army soldier who received the Medal of Honor for his actions during World War II.

== Biography ==
Henry Fred Warner joined the United States Army from his birth city in January 1943, and by December 20, 1944, was serving as a corporal in the Antitank Company of the 2d Battalion, 26th Infantry, 1st Infantry Division. During a battle on that day, near Bütgenbach, Belgium, Warner continued to man his anti-tank gun through the night and into the next morning, despite intense fire from the approaching German tanks. He successfully disabled several enemy tanks before being killed in action. He was posthumously awarded the Medal of Honor six months later, on June 23, 1945.

Warner, aged 21 at his death, was buried at Southside Cemetery in his hometown of Troy, North Carolina.

== Medal of Honor citation ==

Serving as 57-mm. antitank gunner with the 2d Battalion, he was a major factor in stopping enemy tanks during heavy attacks against the battalion position near Dom Butgenbach, Belgium, on 20–21 December 1944. In the first attack, launched in the early morning of the 20th, enemy tanks succeeded in penetrating parts of the line. Cpl. Warner, disregarding the concentrated cannon and machinegun fire from 2 tanks bearing down on him, and ignoring the imminent danger of being overrun by the infantry moving under tank cover, destroyed the first tank and scored a direct and deadly hit upon the second. A third tank approached to within 5 yards of his position while he was attempting to clear a jammed breach lock. Jumping from his gun pit, he engaged in a pistol duel with the tank commander standing in the turret, killing him and forcing the tank to withdraw. Following a day and night during which our forces were subjected to constant shelling, mortar barrages, and numerous unsuccessful infantry attacks, the enemy struck in great force on the early morning of the 21st. Seeing a Mark IV tank looming out of the mist and heading toward his position, Cpl. Warner scored a direct hit. Disregarding his injuries, he endeavored to finish the loading and again fire at the tank whose motor was now aflame, when a second machinegun burst killed him. Cpl. Warner's gallantry and intrepidity at the risk of life above and beyond the call of duty contributed materially to the successful defense against the enemy attacks.

== Legacy ==
Warner Barracks (German: Panzer, LaGarde und Artillerie Kasernen) in Bamberg, West Germany was named in honor of him.

== See also ==
- List of Medal of Honor recipients
- List of Medal of Honor recipients for World War II
