= Ross A. McGinnis =

American soldier and Medal of Honor recipient (1987–2006)

Ross Andrew McGinnis
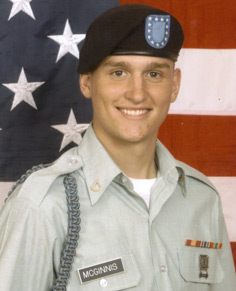
- McGinnis at Fort Benning, Georgia
- Born: June 14, 1987; Meadville, Pennsylvania, United States
- Died: December 4, 2006 (aged 19); Adhamiyah, Baghdad, Iraq
- Burial place: Arlington National Cemetery
- Military career
- Allegiance: United States
- Branch: United States Army
- Service years: 2004–2006
- Rank: Specialist (posthumous)
- Units: 1st Battalion, 26th Infantry Regiment, 1st Infantry Division
- Conflicts: Iraq War
- Awards: Medal of Honor; Bronze Star Medal; Purple Heart

Ross Andrew McGinnis (June 14, 1987 – December 4, 2006) was a United States Army soldier who was posthumously awarded the United States' highest decoration for bravery, the Medal of Honor, for his actions during the Iraq War.

While serving as the gunner in a HMMWV, his convoy was attacked and a hand grenade was thrown into his vehicle. McGinnis was killed in action when he deliberately threw himself on the grenade, saving the lives of at least four other soldiers in the vehicle. He was the fourth service member to receive the Medal of Honor during the Iraq War, which was presented to his family following his death.

== Early life and education ==
McGinnis was born in Meadville, Pennsylvania, on June 14, 1987, to Romayne and Tom McGinnis and grew up in Knox, 90 miles north of Pittsburgh, after his family moved there when he was three. When he was in kindergarten, his teacher gave him a paper that at the top said "When I grow up, I want to be __________" and he wrote "an Army Man". When he was growing up he became involved in the Boy Scouts of America, enjoyed working on cars, and was an athlete playing multiple sports. He played basketball and soccer through the YMCA, and Little League baseball. He attended Clarion County public schools and graduated from Keystone Junior/Senior High School in 2005. He had two sisters, Becky and Katie.

== Military career ==
McGinnis had wanted to be a soldier since kindergarten and joined the United States Army through the Delayed Entry Program on his 17th birthday, on June 14, 2004. Following basic training at Fort Benning, Georgia, he was assigned to the 1st Battalion, 26th Infantry Regiment, in Ledward Barracks, Schweinfurt, Germany.

In August 2006, aged 19, the regiment was deployed to eastern Baghdad and he was serving as a .50 caliber machine-gunner in a HMMWV during operations against insurgents in Adhamiyah. On December 4, while his platoon was on mounted patrol in Adhamiyah, a grenade was thrown into his vehicle. He shouted a warning to the other four men in the vehicle, so they could prepare for the blast. When one of the men responded they could not see where the device had landed, instead of jumping out of the gunner's hatch, McGinnis threw his back over the grenade, absorbing the bulk of the blast. He was killed instantly, but the other occupants suffered only minor injuries.

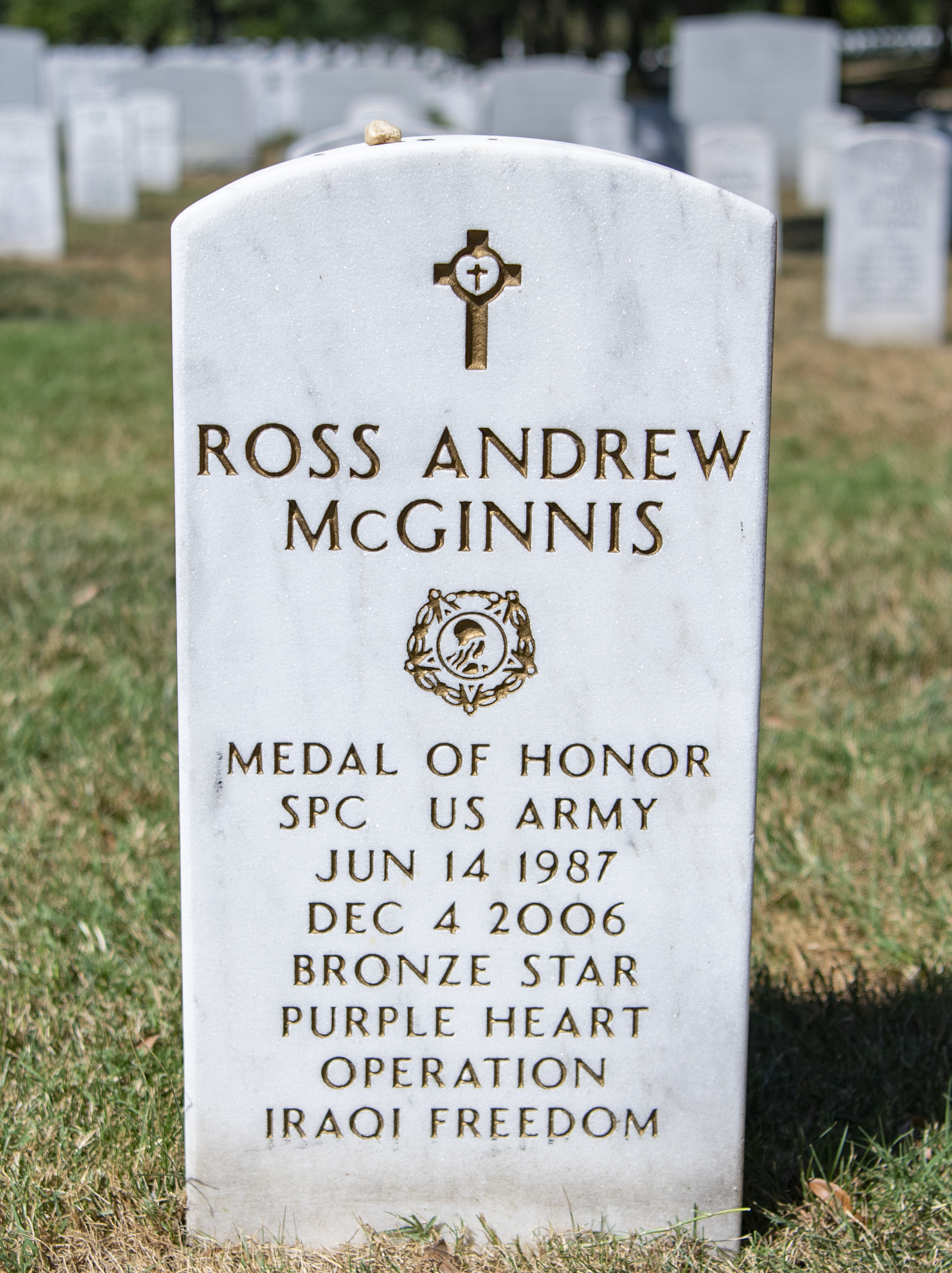
Specialist Ross McGinnis' headstone in Arlington National Cemetery.

McGinnis is buried at Arlington National Cemetery in Virginia. Since the beginning of the Iraq War, he is one of five known United States servicemembers who have thrown themselves on a live grenade. The other personnel known to have done this are Marine Corporal Jason Dunham, Navy SEAL Petty Officer 2nd Class Michael A. Monsoor, Marine Corporal Kyle Carpenter, and Marine Sergeant Rafael Peralta. McGinnis was the fourth recipient of the Medal of Honor in the course of the Iraq War.

A ceremony was held in the east room of the White House on June 2, 2008, in which the medal was presented to his family by President George W. Bush. In addition to his family and the President, many other notable people attended the ceremony, including the Vice President, the Secretary of Veterans Affairs James Peake, Secretary of the Army Pete Geren, Secretary of the Air Force Michael Wynne, General Jim "Hoss" Cartwright, and the Vice Chairman of the Joint Chiefs. Several members of Congress also attended as did members of McGinnis' unit from Iraq, including the other soldiers from the vehicle he sacrificed his life to save.

== Awards and decorations ==
In addition to the Medal of Honor he also received a posthumous promotion to specialist as well as the Bronze Star Medal and the Purple Heart.

Left breast
Combat Infantryman Badge
Medal of Honor
Bronze Star	Purple Heart	Army Good Conduct Medal
National Defense Service Medal	Iraq Campaign Medal with 1 bronze Campaign star	Global War on Terrorism Expeditionary Medal
Global War on Terrorism Service Medal	Army Service Ribbon	Army Overseas Service Ribbon

=== Medal of Honor citation ===
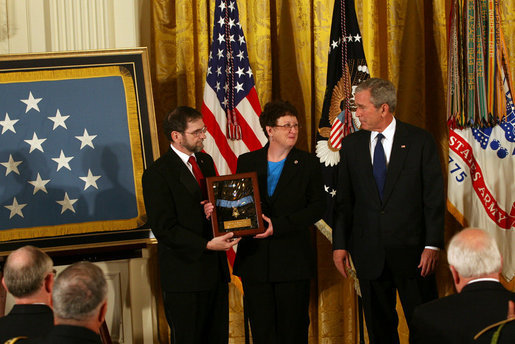
President George Bush presents the Medal of Honor to the parents of Ross McGinnis

For conspicuous gallantry and intrepidity at the risk of his life above and beyond the call of duty:

Private First Class Ross A. McGinnis distinguished himself by acts of gallantry and intrepidity above and beyond the call of duty while serving as an M2 .50-caliber Machine Gunner, 1st Platoon, C Company, 1st Battalion, 26th Infantry Regiment, in connection with combat operations against an armed enemy in Adhamiyah, Northeast Baghdad, Iraq, on December 4, 2006.

That afternoon his platoon was conducting combat control operations in an effort to reduce and control sectarian violence in the area. While Private McGinnis was manning the M2 .50-caliber Machine Gun, a fragmentation grenade thrown by an insurgent fell through the gunner's hatch into the vehicle. Reacting quickly, he yelled "grenade," allowing all four members of his crew to prepare for the grenade's blast. Then, rather than leaping from the gunner's hatch to safety, Private McGinnis made the courageous decision to protect his crew. In a selfless act of bravery, in which he was mortally wounded, Private McGinnis covered the live grenade, pinning it between his body and the vehicle and absorbing most of the explosion.

Private McGinnis' gallant action directly saved four men from certain serious injury or death. Private First Class McGinnis' extraordinary heroism and selflessness at the cost of his own life, above and beyond the call of duty, are in keeping with the highest traditions of the military service and reflect great credit upon himself, his unit, and the United States Army.

=== Other honors ===
A PBS Special Report chronicled the life of McGinnis as told by his parents, friends and the people of his hometown of Knox, Clarion County, Pennsylvania.

== See also ==
- List of Medal of Honor recipients
