= Keystone Junior/Senior High School =

Keystone Jr. – Sr. High School

Location
- 700 Beatty Avenue; Knox, Pennsylvania 16232

Information
- School type: Public Junior/Senior High School
- Principal: Kelli McNaughton
- Staff: 29
- Faculty: 38
- Grades: 7–12
- Age: 12 to 18
- Athletics conference: PIAA District IX /KSAC
- Team name: Panthers
- Rivals: North Clarion Wolves, Clarion Bobcats, Union Knights
- Newspaper: Prowler

Keystone High School is a high school in Knox, Pennsylvania. There are about 600 students and 40 faculty members at the school. The school is one of seven public high schools in Clarion County. Students, if they wish to pursue a vocational trade, may attend the Clarion County Career Center in Shippenville part-time.

== Alma Mater ==
The Alma Mater for Keystone is as follows:
Keystone High our Alma Mater,
Fount of wisdom, truth and light:
Thee we love on thee rely,
For thy guidance always right.
We sing out thy fame and honor,
We recall thy ideals true,
As we strive with hope anew.

We salute thee Keystone High School,
Praise to thee we loud proclaim;
As we strive to bring thee glory,
Paying tribute to thy name.
Memories pleasant, classmates loyal, All are treasures we hold dear,
As we face each future year.

== Graduation Requirements ==
Students at Keystone need to earn 24 credits in grades 9–12, pass the PSSA, as well as complete a Senior Project.

=== Course Structure ===
Subject Area	#/Credits	Notes
English	4.0	
Health	1.0	2 Planned Courses – Alternating Days in Grades 9 and 12
Mathematics	4.0	
Physical Education	2.0	
Social Studies	3.0	
Driver's Education	0.25	
Science	3.0	
Arts/Humanities	2.0	
Electives	5.75	Minimum of 5.75
TOTAL	24.0	

=== Courses Available ===
There are several courses available

- Art
- Business – Including: Desktop Publishing and Webpage Design
- English
- Family and Consumer Sciences – Including: Sewing
- Foreign Language – Includes: French, Spanish and possible courses in Latin and Japanese via satellite.
- Health and Physical Education
- Industrial Technology – Includes: Wood shop, Drafting, and Airbrush courses
- Mathematics
- Music
- Science
- Social Studies
- Traffic Safety

== Clubs ==
The following is a list of major clubs at KHS, depending on the need more clubs will open up as needed:

- Student Council
- National Honor Society
- Yearbook
- Panther Peers – Tutoring/Mediation club
- Keystone Youth Education Assn. (A chapter of Future Teachers of America)
- French Students to Europe
- Fellowship of Christian Students
- D&D
- Archery

== High School Athletics ==
Keystone participates in PIAA District IX (9)

Sport Name	Boys	Girls
Baseball / Softball	Class A	Class A
Basketball	Class AA	Class AA
Cross country	Class AA	Class AA
Football	Class AA	
Golf	Class AAAA	Class AAAA
Soccer	Class A	Class A
Track and Field	Class AA	Class AA
Volleyball		Class A
Wrestling	Class AA	

== Alumni ==
Ross A. McGinnis – Iraq war hero and Medal of Honor recipient
