= Barnwell R. Legge =

United States Army general (1891–1949)

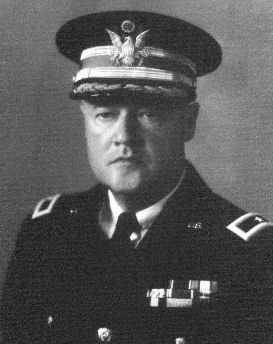
- Born: July 9, 1891; Charleston, South Carolina, United States
- Died: June 7, 1949 (aged 57); Washington, D.C., United States
- Burial place: Arlington National Cemetery, Virginia, United States
- Military career
- Allegiance: United States
- Branch: United States Army
- Service years: 1911–1948
- Rank: Brigadier General
- Conflicts: World War I; Battle of Soissons; Meuse-Argonne Offensive; World War II
- Awards: Distinguished Service Cross; Distinguished Service Medal; Silver Star (4)

Barnwell Rhett Legge CBE (July 9, 1891 – June 7, 1949) was a highly decorated United States Army Brigadier General and combat leader. He is most noted as one of the most decorated U.S. Military members of World War I and as Military Attaché to Switzerland during World War II.

== Early years ==
Legge was born in Charleston, South Carolina to Claude Lascelles Legge and Elizabeth Judd Hutchinson Legge. He attended The Citadel and graduated in 1911.

Legge studied law at the University of South Carolina. After the US entered World War I, he was appointed the regimental adjutant of the 26th Infantry Regiment under the command of Lieutenant Colonel Theodore Roosevelt Jr. (the eldest son of President Theodore Roosevelt). Roosevelt Jr. later wrote in his book "Average Americans":

"All during my service in Europe, Legge served with me. During the latter part he was my second in command in the regiment. I have seen him under all circumstances. He was always cool and decided. No mission was too difficult for him to undertake. His ability as a troop leader was of the highest order. In my opinion no man of his age has a better war record."

Legge participated with the 26th Infantry in the Battle of Soissons, where half of the men of 26th Infantry Regiment were killed in combat. For conspicuous gallantry in action Legge was awarded 4 Silver Stars.

Major Legge subsequently participated in the Meuse-Argonne Offensive and personally led an attack against a strong enemy position. Legge inspired his men by his courage, cutting his way through entanglements and directing the attacks against three different strong points. For this actions, he was awarded the Distinguished Service Cross for extraordinary heroism in combat.

For his military service during World War I, Legge was also awarded the Army Distinguished Service Medal for his leadership of 26th Infantry regiment and the Legion of Honour and French Croix de guerre 1914-1918 with Palm by the French government.

== World War II ==
After the War, Legge served at various infantry positions, including the capacity of instructor at Command and General Staff College at Fort Leavenworth, Kansas from 1936 to 1939.

He subsequently served for a short period as an Assistant Military Attaché to France and then was the Military Attaché to Switzerland at the US Legation in Bern. He stayed in Switzerland for the whole period of World War II and in this capacity, he helped arrange the escape of many interned US fliers. For service in this capacity, Legge was awarded with the Legion of Merit by the US Government. He also received Order of the British Empire in the grade of Commander by the United Kingdom.

Historian Donald Miller regards Legge as an altogether more controversial figure than his post-war accolades would suggest. He is severely critical of Legge's role in Switzerland: "The country’s military police actively hunted down American fliers making for the border, shooting and wounding a number of them. Most of those who were apprehended were sentenced to indeterminate prison terms, with the compliance of General Legge, who was unofficially in charge of American military internees. Using the threat of court-martial, Legge warned American airmen not to escape. Escape attempts would alienate their hosts, Legge told Spaatz’s headquarters in England, and slow down the negotiations he was secretly conducting for the airmen’s release. But Legge was more concerned with appeasing the Swiss than with freeing the American internees, and when fellow Americans were caught escaping and imprisoned by the Swiss, he monitored their deplorable prison conditions with inexcusable indifference. In the last two years of the war, the "benevolent hosts" of the American airmen threw 187 of them into one of the most abhorrent prison compounds in Europe, a punishment camp run by a sadistic Nazi."

However, another historian, Dwight Mears, profiled the fate of American airmen in Switzerland in his dissertation while teaching at West Point, and reached a starkly different conclusion. Mears documented that Legge was, in reality, running the escape network to get U.S. airmen out of Switzerland, and in no way condoned the imprisonment of these men for attempting escape. Rather than appeasing the Swiss, Legge was actually under investigation by the Swiss government for assisting the Americans to flee from internment. In fact, the Swiss Federal Council considered issuing a formal demarche against his activities, which they communicated to Legge directly. Legge did not bow to this pressure, but rather appealed directly to senior Swiss officials in order to secure better treatment for the airmen. He even threatened to leak word of their actions to the press to embarrass them, as he knew very well that allegations that the Swiss government was violating international law would taint the Swiss reputation for upholding humanitarian norms. The threat was made good on in 1945, when the Army's publication Yank: The Army Weekly profiled the actions of the Swiss government, ostensibly drawing from U.S. Legation files that virtually quoted Legge's description of punishment camp conditions.

Mears concluded that the negative impressions of Legge were forged by the lack of communication between the Legation and the internees, which was a direct consequence of Swiss interference after internment officials discovered that Legation visits to interned airmen quickly resulted in successful escapes. As a result, such visits were prohibited, and internees had little personal contact with the attaché or his staff. The airmen were almost entirely cut off from reliable information, and often jumped to conclusions that were based solely on rumors or assumptions. In fact, after making good on their escapes, a number of airmen protested to the War Department about perceived negligence by the Legation staff. In late 1944, the War Department officially investigated whether Legge had threatened to court martial airmen for unauthorized escape attempts, but it was clear that there was no formal evidence that such a threat had ever been issued. Rather, this was likely a misunderstanding of Legge's instruction not to escape without assistance from the Legation, which was an unsuccessful attempt to improve their chances of success.

Brigadier General Barnwell R. Legge retired in 1948 due to poor health and died on June 7, 1949, in Washington, D.C. at the age of 57. He was buried together with his wife Phyllis B. Legge at Arlington National Cemetery.

== Decorations ==
Here is Brigadier General Legge's ribbon bar:

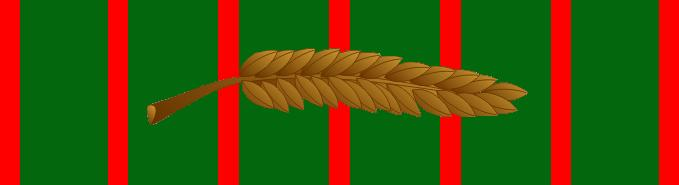

1st Row	Distinguished Service Cross		Army Distinguished Service Medal	Silver Star with three Oak Leaf Clusters	
2nd Row	Legion of Merit	Purple Heart		Mexican Border Service Medal	World War I Victory Medal with five Battle Clasps
3rd Row	American Defense Service Medal	American Campaign Medal		European-African-Middle Eastern Campaign Medal	World War II Victory Medal
4th Row	Army of Occupation Medal	Commander of the Order of the British Empire		Chevalier of the Legion of Honor (France)	French Croix de guerre 1914–1918 with 2 Palms
