= U.S. Army Garrison Bamberg =

United States Army Garrison Bamberg was located on Warner Barracks in Bamberg, Germany. The unit provided "installation capabilities and services to support expeditionary operations in a time of persistent conflict, and to provide a quality of life for soldiers and families commensurate with their service."

USAG Bamberg was subordinate to United States Army Installation Management Command – Europe and an indirect report garrison under USAG Ansbach.

The facility closed in 2014 because of changes in US military spending priorities.

== History ==
The Warner Barracks were first occupied by the United States Army at the end of World War II. The barracks became the headquarters of the U.S. Constabulary, a mobile unit of the 28th Infantry Regiment and the 1st Infantry Division. This unit was responsible for patrolling the areas of Germany then occupied by U.S. forces.

=== 1990–1999 ===
Bamberg units were involved in Operation Desert Storm from November 1990 through August 1991 and many returned to complete the deactivation process started prior to their involvement in the Gulf War. In October 1991, the Bamberg military community was designated as the 279th Base Support Battalion under the 99th Area Support Group, Nuremberg.

The 279th Base Support Battalion was realigned under the 98th Area Support Group in Wurzburg, Germany, in October 1993.

In 1995, numerous units were successfully restationed from Nuremberg to Bamberg, a very complex process involving $4.5 million worth of construction, and over 1,000 people.

=== 2000–2010 ===
On 1 October 2002, the Secretary of the Army formally activated the United States Army Installation Management Agency (IMA). IMA is the result of the Army leadership's vision to streamline headquarters and promote optimal care for soldiers and families.

On 13 October 2005, the Area Support Groups and Base Support Battalions were redesignated as United States Army Garrisons under the Installation Management Agency – Europe Region, Heidelberg.

Members of the Bamberg German/American military community have participated in Operations Joint Endeavor, Joint Guard, Joint Forge, Able Sentry, KFOR, Operation Enduring Freedom, and Operation Iraqi Freedom.
