= 26th Infantry Regiment (United States) =

- 26th Infantry Regiment Coat of Arms
- Active: 1901–present
- Country: United States
- Branch: Army
- Type: Infantry
- Size: Regiment
- Part of: 101st Airborne Division
- Regimental Headquarters: Fort Campbell, Kentucky
- Nickname: "Blue Spaders"
- Motto: Palmam qui meruit ferat ("Let him bear the palm who has won it")
- Facings: Light blue
- Engagements: Philippine Insurrection; World War I World War II: Algeria-French Morocco; Tunisia Campaign; Operation Husky; Operation Overlord; Northern France; Rhineland; Ardennes-Alsace; Western Allied invasion of Germany; Vietnam War; Kosovo Campaign; Iraq War; Afghan War

Commanders
- Notable commanders: Robert Lee Bullard; Charles DuVal Roberts; Theodore Roosevelt Jr. Barnwell R. Legge; John H. Hughes; John F. Madden; John F. R. Seitz; John W. Bowen

Insignia
- Distinctive unit insignia

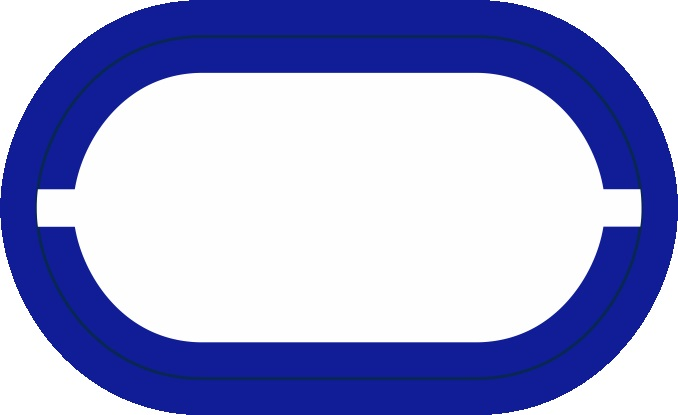
- Airborne background trimming

- Organizational beret flash, worn on the Army black beret

The 26th Infantry Regiment is an infantry regiment of the United States Army. Its nickname is "Blue Spaders", taken from German soldiers in World War I who saw the spade-like device on the regiment's distinctive unit insignia and called the soldiers “Blauerspadern”. The 26th Infantry Regiment is part of the U.S. Army Regimental System; currently only the 1st Battalion is active and assigned to the 2nd Mobile Brigade Combat Team, 101st Airborne Division (Air Assault).

== History ==
At the beginning of the 20th century, the United States Army was sorely pressed to meet its overseas commitments in Cuba, the Philippines, and Puerto Rico. As a result, in 1901 Congress authorized five additional Regular Army infantry regiments; the 26th, 27th, 28th, 29th, and 30th Infantry. (These regiments should not be confused with United States volunteer regiments with the same numerical designations which served from 1899 to 1901.)

=== Philippines ===
The 26th Infantry began its life overseas in the Philippines and spent its first 20 years of service on deployments to the Southwest Pacific, the Mexican and Indian frontier and in Europe. It earned its first battle streamer during the Philippine–American War within two years of its forming as a unit.

=== World War I ===
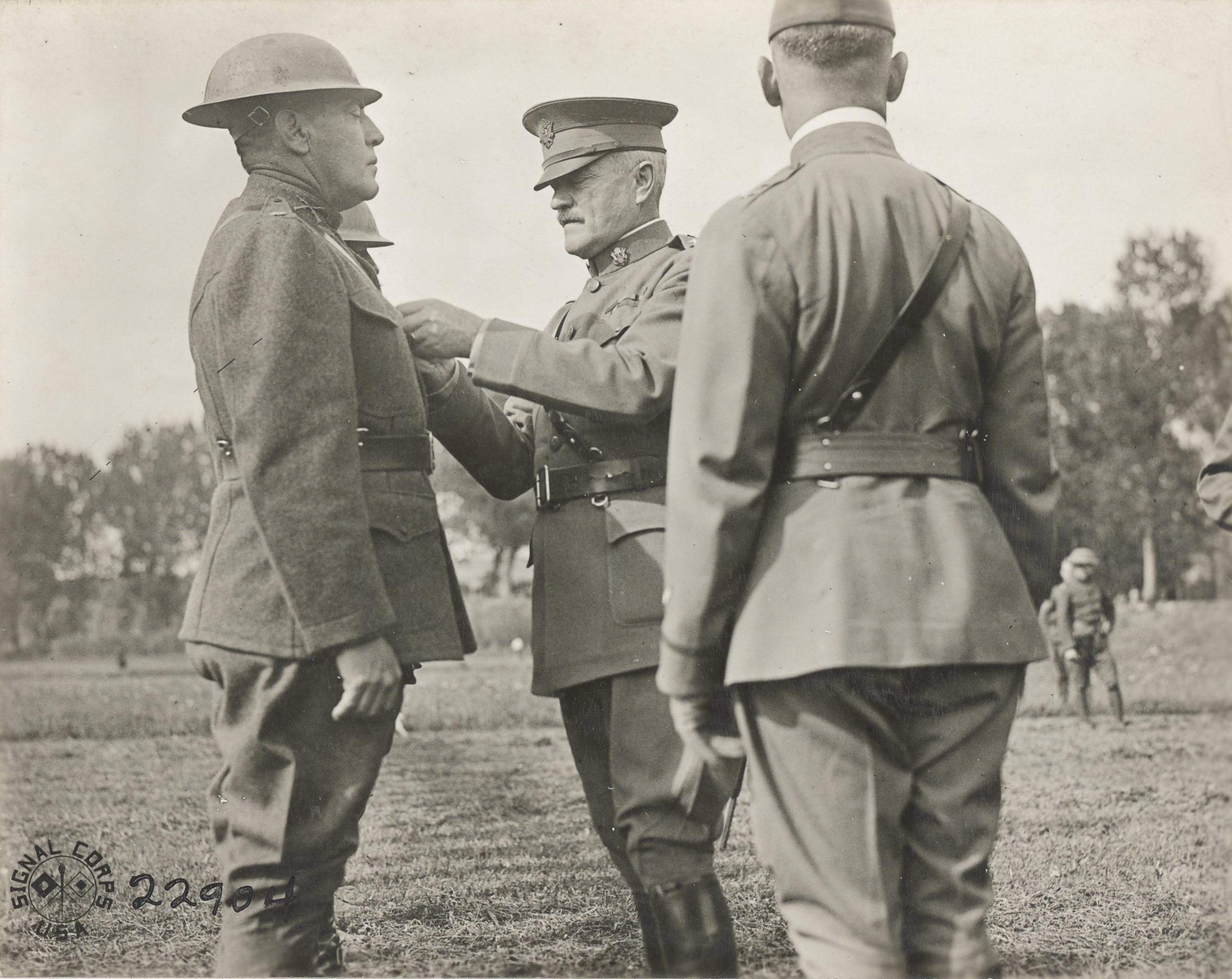
General John J. Pershing pinning the Distinguished Service Cross (DSC) on Lieutenant Colonel J. M. Cullison, commander of the 26th Infantry Regiment, 1st Division, France, September 7, 1918. Pictured with his back towards the camera is Major General Charles P. Summerall, the 1st Division's commander.

After returning to the same location for another tour of duty (a habit the Blue Spaders would keep for the entire century), the regiment fought off Mexican bandits and settled disputes in the Indian Territory, until it was selected as one of only four Regular Army infantry regiments deemed fit for immediate combat to form the 1st Expeditionary Division (later redesignated the 1st Division) in June 1917, shortly after the American entry into World War I. Thus began the regiment's long association with the "Big Red One".

As part of the first American soldiers to arrive in France, the regiment immediately left for the front. Along with its sister regiments of the division, it earned more campaign streamers than any other regiments during World War I. However, they came at a terrible cost. Over 900 Blue Spaders died in a six-month period. At Soissons alone, the regimental commander, executive officer, two of three battalion commanders and the regimental sergeant major were killed in action; sixty-two officers were killed or wounded; and of the 3,100 Blue Spaders that started the attack, over 1,500 had been killed or wounded. But the battle was won, and this turned the tide for the Allies at a crucial period during the summer of 1918. By the war's end, the soldiers had earned seven battle streamers and two foreign awards.

=== Interwar period ===
The 26th Infantry arrived at the port of New York on 3 September 1919 on the USS Finland. It participated in the 1st Division Victory Parades in New York City and Washington, D.C., on 10 and 17 September 1919, respectively. The regiment was transferred 4 October 1919 to Camp Zachary Taylor, Kentucky, on 10 September 1920 to Camp Dix, New Jersey, and on 1 July 1922 to Plattsburg Barracks, New York. It participated in the silent movie Janice Meredith in 1924 with actress Marion Davies presenting the regiment a Tiffany’s silver service in appreciation of their participation. The regiment was awarded the Chief of Infantry’s Marksmanship Trophy for 1938. Assigned Reserve officers conducted summer training with the regiment at Plattsburg Barracks. In October 1939, the regiment departed the New York Port of Embarkation on the USAT Republic and debarked at the port of Charleston, South Carolina, en route to maneuvers in the vicinity of Fort Benning, Georgia, to test the new "triangular" division concept. After maneuvers in Louisiana in May 1940, it returned to Plattsburg Barracks on 5 June 1940. The 2nd Battalion was transferred in August 1940 to Fort Devens, Massachusetts, and the remainder of the regiment was transferred on 27 February 1941 to Fort Devens.

=== World War II ===
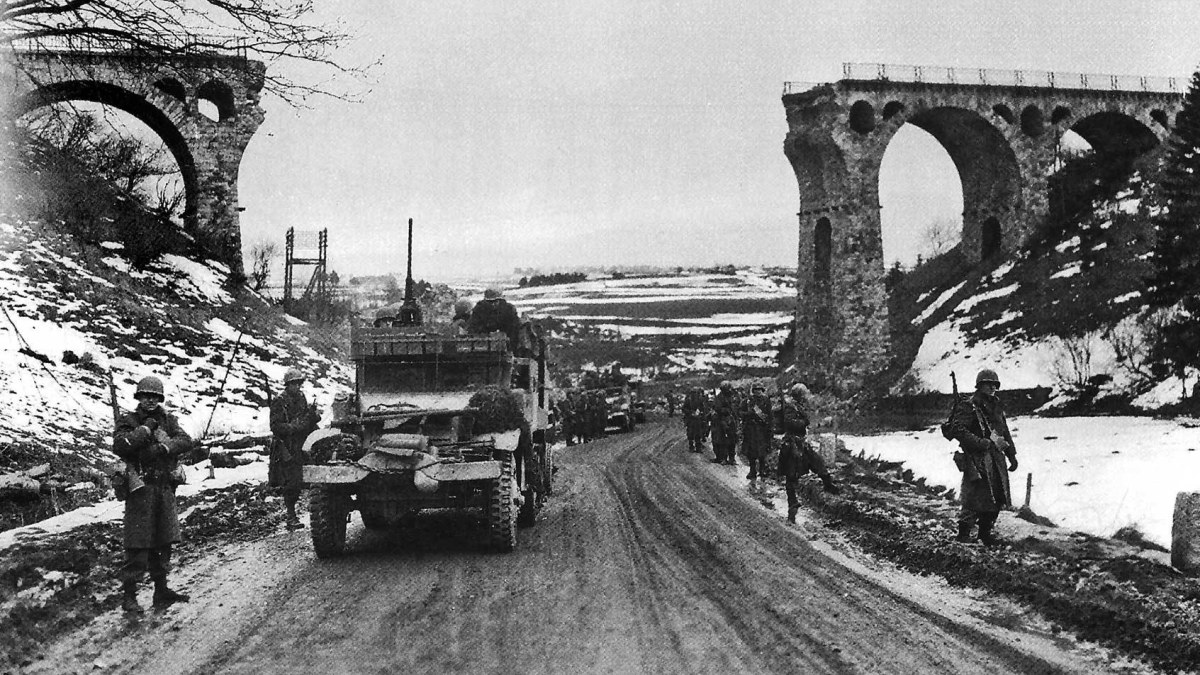
Men of 1st Battalion, 26th Infantry, 1st Infantry Division, passing through the viaduct of the Vennquerbahn (Rail line 45A) over Monschauer Street (N647) at Bütgenbach. It was part of the railway running from Losheim/Eifel to Trois-Ponts, and had been blown up by retreating German troops.

In 1941, the regiment once again stood with its sister regiments and prepared for war in Europe. The regiment was assigned to the 1st Infantry Division for the duration of World War II. In World War II, the 26th Infantry led America's first-ever amphibious assault in North Africa, fought at the Kasserine Pass, assaulted Sicily at the Amphibious Battle of Gela, invaded Normandy at Omaha Beach, conquered the first German city of the war at Aachen, held the line against heavy German attacks at Elsenborn Ridge during The Battle of the Bulge, vaulted the Rhine and attacked all the way to Czechoslovakia by war's end. The regiment, commanded by Colonel John F. R. Seitz, conducted three amphibious assaults, and earned seven battle streamers, a Presidential Unit Citation, and five foreign awards.

Beginning another occupation of Germany, the Blue Spaders bore the United States national colors at the Allied Victory in Europe parade and served as guards at Nuremberg War Crimes Trials. Thus began a lengthy stay in Germany, first as conquerors and later as friends and allies. Called again to serve in the United States after a reorganization of the army, the unit was redesignated 1st Battalion, 26th Infantry and had a very short stay in the United States.

=== Cold War ===
In February 1963, the 2nd Battle Group, 26th Infantry was activated (with assets of 1st Battle Group, 5th Infantry) and assigned to the 1st Infantry Division at Fort Riley, Kansas. The 2nd Battle Group, 26th Infantry participated in Operation Long Thrust VII, reinforcing the Berlin Brigade in the summer and autumn of 1963 before redeploying to Fort Riley, where it was inactivated in January 1964.

=== Vietnam War ===
After serving as a battle group in Europe in the early 1960s, the battalion rejoined the 1st Infantry Division shortly before receiving orders to deploy as a part of the Army's first divisional-sized unit in Vietnam in 1965. The Blue Spaders served longer in Vietnam with their Big Red One units than any other division. After five continuous years of combat, the Blue Spaders received orders to return home in 1970 with eleven battle streamers, a Valorous Unit Award and two foreign awards for its colors.

=== Service in Germany ===
At the conclusion of Vietnam, the battalion returned to Germany as part of a forward-deployed brigade of the Big Red One.

=== Training recruits ===
The 26th Infantry was reassigned to TRADOC in April 1987. All three Spader battalions spent several years training recruits at Fort Dix, New Jersey and Fort Jackson, South Carolina, until reassigned to the First Infantry Division in January 1996.

=== Balkan Wars ===
In 1996, the battalion rejoined the Big Red One in Germany only to send Delta company to Bosnia as part of the first American forces to enter the Balkans from February to September 1996. The entire battalion followed its initial deployment from October 1996 to April 1997. In March 1998, the unit deployed to the Balkans, this time to the Republic of Macedonia. Returning briefly in September 1998, the battalion was one of the first unit alerted for deployment to Kosovo in June 1999. It returned in December 1999. During this period, the unit earned the Superior Unit Award streamer and the Defense of Kosovo streamer. Three of the Task Force 1-26 Infantry soldiers died in Kosovo. PFC McGill. 1 Aug 1999. Cco 1- 26inf 1st ID.

=== Operation Iraqi Freedom II ===
In February 2004 the "Blue Spaders" deployed to Iraq as part of OIF II. The unit primarily bore responsibility for Sammara, the capital of Salahuddin Province, a major part of the so-called Sunni Triangle. The battalion returned to Schweinfurt, Germany in February 2005.

=== Operation Iraqi Freedom 06-08 ===
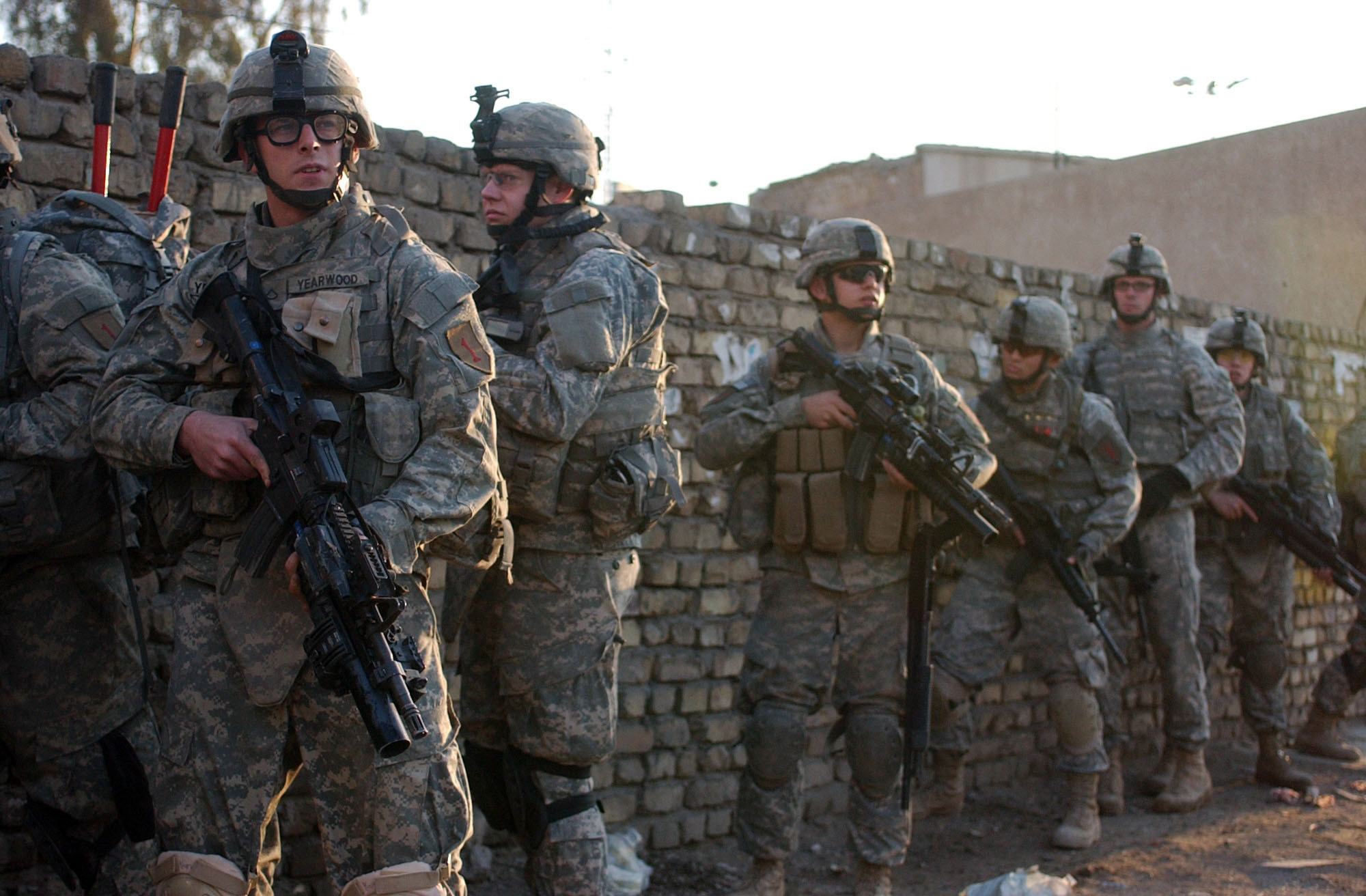
Soldiers from C Company, 1st Battalion, 26th Infantry Regiment, conduct a Cordon and Search operation in Al Adhamiya, Baghdad, Iraq, 21 Feb. 2007.

==== Deployment in 2006 to Iraq ====
On 5 August 2006 Task Force "Blue Spader" deployed to Eastern Baghdad. The battalion's B Company was cross attached to TF 1-77 Armor, in return TF 1-26 Infantry received B Company, 1-77 Armor, B Company, 9th Engineers, a fire support team from 1-7 Field Artillery, and a maintenance support team from 299th Forward Support Battalion. Task Force 1-26 Infantry operated as the primary maneuver element in the Eastern Baghdad area.

==== Return to Germany in December 2007 and total casualties ====
The unit returned to Schweinfurt, Germany, in December 2007. Thirty-one soldiers from the battalion died during the deployment.

=== Operation Enduring Freedom ===
==== July 2008 Deployment ====
In July 2008 the battalion deployed to Kunar Province of Afghanistan. Most of the unit was scattered in small combat outposts throughout the province to include the Kunar Valley, Pech Valley, Watapor Valley, Chapadara, and the Korengal Valley. The unit fell under CJTF-101 and later CJTF-82 during OEF 8 and 9.

==== Ambushing the Taliban on April 10, 2009 ====
A platoon of American soldiers of 2nd Platoon of 1st Battalion, 26th Infantry patrolled into the wilderness of the landscape of Afghanistan. The Americans set an ambush. The Americans placed claymore mines and set up firing positions. It became dark and the Americans hidden in the dark activated their night vision goggles. Soon, a large column of Taliban fighters came by not suspecting an American ambush. When the Taliban column entered the kill zone, the Americans sprang their ambush and detonated their claymore mines. The claymore mines send thousands of steel ball shrapnel into the ranks of the Taliban fighters. The Americans opened heavy fire with machine guns, assault rifles, 40mm grenades from m203 grenade launchers, and other small arms. The Americans also called in F-15 Strike Eagles to launch aerial attacks on the Taliban. The Americans killed 15 Taliban fighters while suffering 2 injured from spraining their legs while tripping. U.S. helicopters evacuated the 2 injured U.S. soldiers. The rest of the U.S. soldiers confiscated 10 AK47 assault rifles, a RPG launcher, 30 AK magazines, and 2 grenades from the dead fighters. Then the Americans withdrew safely back to base with Apache gunships providing air cover.

==== Return to Fort Hood in July 2009 ====
The unit returned to Fort Hood, Texas in July 2009. They were quickly moved again from Fort Hood, Texas to Fort Knox, Kentucky, having only months to get ready for another deployment in January 2011 and one more after from 2013-2014 under CJSOTF command.

== Medal of Honor recipients ==
- Private James W. Reese. World War II. On 5 August 1943, at Mt. Vassillio, Sicily, for conspicuous gallantry and intrepidity at the risk of life. above and beyond the call of duty in action involving actual conflict with the enemy. When the enemy launched a counterattack which threatened the position of his company, Pvt. Reese, as the acting squad leader of a 60-mm. mortar squad, displaying superior leadership on his own initiative, maneuvered his squad forward to a favorable position, from which, by skillfully directing the fire of his weapon, he caused many casualties in the enemy ranks, and aided materially in repulsing the counterattack. When the enemy fire became so severe as to make his position untenable, he ordered the other members of his squad to withdraw to a safer position, but declined to seek safety for himself. So as to bring more effective fire upon the enemy, Pvt. Reese, without assistance, moved his mortar to a new position and attacked an enemy machinegun nest. He had only 3 rounds of ammunition but secured a direct hit with his last round, completely destroying the nest and killing the occupants. Ammunition being exhausted, he abandoned the mortar. seized a rifle and continued to advance, moving into an exposed position overlooking the enemy. Despite a heavy concentration of machinegun, mortar, and artillery fire, the heaviest experienced by his unit throughout the entire Sicilian campaign, he remained at this position and continued to inflict casualties upon the enemy until he was killed. His bravery, coupled with his gallant and unswerving determination to close with the enemy, regardless of consequences and obstacles which he faced, are a priceless inspiration to our armed forces.
- Sergeant Francis X. McGraw. World War II. On 19 November 1944, near Schevenhutte, Germany, while serving with Company H, He manned a heavy machinegun emplaced in a foxhole near Schevenhutte, Germany, on 19 November 1944, when the enemy launched a fierce counterattack. Braving an intense hour-long preparatory barrage, he maintained his stand and poured deadly accurate fire into the advancing foot troops until they faltered and came to a halt. The hostile forces brought up a machinegun in an effort to dislodge him but were frustrated when he lifted his gun to an exposed but advantageous position atop a log, courageously stood up in his foxhole and knocked out the enemy weapon. A rocket blasted his gun from position, but he retrieved it and continued firing. He silenced a second machinegun and then made repeated trips over fire-swept terrain to replenish his ammunition supply. Wounded painfully in this dangerous task, he disregarded his injury and hurried back to his post, where his weapon was showered with mud when another rocket barely missed him. In the midst of the battle, with enemy troops taking advantage of his predicament to press forward, he calmly cleaned his gun, put it back into action and drove off the attackers. He continued to fire until his ammunition was expended, when, with a fierce desire to close with the enemy, he picked up a carbine, killed 1 enemy soldier, wounded another and engaged in a desperate firefight with a third until he was mortally wounded by a burst from a machine pistol. The extraordinary heroism and intrepidity displayed by Pvt. McGraw inspired his comrades to great efforts and was a major factor in repulsing the enemy attack.
- Corporal Henry F. Warner. World War II. 20–21 December 1944, near Dom Butgenbach, Belgium, while assigned to the 2d Battalion Anti-Tank Company, he was a major factor in stopping enemy tanks during heavy attacks against the battalion position. Disregarding the concentrated cannon and machinegun fire from 2 tanks bearing down on him, and ignoring the imminent danger of being overrun by the infantry moving under tank cover, he destroyed the first tank and scored a direct and deadly hit upon the second. A third tank approached to within 5 yards of his position while he was attempting to clear a jammed breach lock. Jumping from his gun pit, he engaged in a pistol duel with the tank commander standing in the turret, killing him and forcing the tank to withdraw. Following a day and night during which our forces were subjected to constant shelling, mortar barrages, and numerous unsuccessful infantry attacks, the enemy struck in great force on the early morning of the 21st. Seeing a Mark IV tank looming out of the mist and heading toward his position, Cpl. Warner scored a direct hit. Disregarding his injuries, he endeavored to finish the loading and again fire at the tank whose motor was now aflame, when a second machinegun burst killed him. Cpl. Warner's gallantry and intrepidity at the risk of life above and beyond the call of duty contributed materially to the successful defense against the enemy attacks.
- Specialist Robert F. Stryker. Vietnam War. 7 November 1967, while assigned to C Company, 1st Battalion, 26th Infantry Regiment, SP4 Robert F. Stryker threw himself upon an enemy Claymore mine as it was detonated near Loc Ninh, Republic of Vietnam. He was mortally wounded as his body absorbed the blast and shielded his comrades from the explosion. His unselfish actions were responsible for saving the lives of at least 6 of his fellow soldiers.
- Specialist Ross A. McGinnis. Operation Iraqi Freedom. On 4 December 2006, in Baghdad, Iraq, while serving with Company C, 1st Battalion, 26th Infantry Regiment, he threw himself upon a grenade that was thrown into his HMMWV gun truck, saving the lives of the other four crewmen. Private First Class Ross A. McGinnis was posthumously promoted to the rank of specialist and awarded the Medal of Honor for his actions.

== Heraldic items ==
=== Coat of arms ===
- Blazon
  - Shield: Argent, a royal palm branch paleways Proper, on a chief embattled Azure five Mohawk arrowheads of the first. For informal use, the shield encircled by a fourragére in the colors of the French Croix de Guerre.
  - Crest: On a wreath of the colors Argent and Azure a sun in splendor charged with a Mohawk arrowhead Azure.
  - Motto: "PALMAM QUI MERUIT FERAT" (Let Him Bear The Palm Who Has Won It).
- Symbolism: The shield is white with a blue chief, the old and the present Infantry colors. The dividing line embattled stands for the entrenchments which the regiment has so many times assaulted. The Mohawk arrowhead was the regimental insignia during World War I. It was selected by Colonel Hamilton A. Smith as indicating the American virtues and the regimental spirit of courage, resourceful daring and relentless pursuit of an enemy. Colonel Smith was killed while leading the regiment in the first great offensive in which it took part. The arrow is repeated five times because in five major offensives the regiment exhibited these qualities indicated by the badge which it had adopted and by which it was designated during these engagements. The palm of victory displayed on the shield and the motto refer to the only award the regiment seeks. The arrowhead is repeated in the crest to indicate the same regimental spirit under all conditions. The sun, taken from the Katipunan flag, symbolizes service in the Philippine Insurrection.
- Background: The coat of arms was approved on 1973-04-16.

=== Distinctive unit insignia ===
- Description: The distinctive unit insignia is a gold color metal and enamel device 1 1/8 inches (2.9 cm) in height overall, consisting of a white enamel shield charged with a blue enamel Indian arrowhead point to chief.
- Symbolism: The shield is the characteristic device of the regiment.
- Background: The distinctive unit insignia was approved on 1973-04-16.

=== Background Trimmings ===
- Description: A white oval-shaped embroidered item 1 3/8 inches (3.5 cm) in height and 2 1/4 inches (5.72 cm) in width overall, all within a 1/4 (3.18 cm) ultramarine blue border notched at the horizontal center line.
- The background trimming was approved on 24 October 2014.

== Lineage ==
26th Infantry Regiment

Constituted 2 February 1901 in the Regular Army as the 26th Infantry

Organized 22 February 1901 with headquarters at Fort McPherson, Georgia

(1st Battalion organized in December 1900 at the Presidio of San Francisco, California, as the 1st Provisional Battalion of Infantry; redesignated 7 February 1901 as the 1st Battalion, 26th Infantry)

(2d Battalion organized March–April 1901 at Fort McPherson, Georgia; redesignated 29 May 1901 as the 1st Battalion, 27th Infantry—hereafter separate lineage; new 2d Battalion, 26th Infantry, organized 1 July 1901 in the Philippine Islands)

(3d Battalion organized in January 1901 at the Presidio of San Francisco, California, as the 2d Provisional Battalion of Infantry; redesignated 8 February 1901 as the 1st Battalion, 27th Infantry; redesignated 29 May 1901 as the 3d Battalion, 26th Infantry)

Assigned 8 June 1917 to the 1st Expeditionary Division (later redesignated as the 1st Infantry Division)

Relieved 15 February 1957 from assignment to the 1st Infantry Division and reorganized as a parent regiment under the Combat Arms Regimental System

Withdrawn 3 April 1987 from the Combat Arms Regimental System, reorganized under the United States Army Regimental System, and transferred to the United States Army Training and Doctrine Command

Withdrawn 15 January 1996 from the United States Army Training and Doctrine Command

Redesignated 1 October 2005 as the 26th Infantry Regiment

1st Battalion, 26th Infantry Regiment

Organized 25 December 1900 in the Regular Army at the Presidio of San Francisco, California, as Company A, 1st Provisional Battalion of Infantry

Consolidated 7 February 1901 with Company A, 26th Infantry (constituted 2 February 1901 in the Regular Army), and consolidated unit designated as Company A, 26th Infantry

(26th Infantry assigned 8 June 1917 to the 1st Expeditionary Division (later redesignated as the 1st Infantry Division)

Reorganized and redesignated 15 February 1957 as Headquarters and Headquarters Company, 1st Battle Group, 26th Infantry, and remained assigned to the 1st Infantry Division (organic elements concurrently constituted and activated)

Relieved 14 April 1959 from assignment to the 1st Infantry Division and assigned to the 8th Infantry Division

Relieved 24 October 1962 from assignment to the 8th Infantry Division and assigned to the 2d Infantry Division

Relieved 15 February 1963 from assignment to the 2d Infantry Division and assigned to the 1st Infantry Division

Reorganized and redesignated 13 January 1964 as the 1st Battalion, 26th Infantry

Inactivated 24 February 1983 in Germany and relieved from assignment to the 1st Infantry Division

Headquarters transferred 3 April 1987 to the United States Army Training and Doctrine Command and activated at Fort Dix, New Jersey

Inactivated 15 January 1996 at Fort Jackson, South Carolina, and withdrawn from the United States Army Training and Doctrine Command

Battalion assigned 16 February 1996 to the 1st Infantry Division and activated in Germany

Redesignated 1 October 2005 as the 1st Battalion, 26th Infantry Regiment

Relieved 16 March 2008 from assignment to the 1st Infantry Division and assigned to the 3d Brigade Combat Team, 1st Infantry Division

2d Battalion, 26th Infantry Regiment

Organized 28 December 1900 in the Regular Army at the Presidio of San Francisco, California, as Company B, 1st Provisional Battalion of Infantry

Consolidated 7 February 1901 with Company B, 26th Infantry (constituted 2 February 1901 in the Regular Army), and consolidated unit designated as Company B, 26th Infantry

(26th Infantry assigned 8 June 1917 to the 1st Expeditionary Division [later redesignated as the 1st Infantry Division])

Inactivated 15 February 1957 at Fort Riley, Kansas, and relieved from assignment to the 1st Infantry Division; concurrently redesignated as Headquarters and Headquarters Company, 2d Battle Group, 26th Infantry

Assigned 1 February 1963 to the 1st Infantry Division and activated at Fort Riley, Kansas (organic elements concurrently constituted and activated)

Inactivated 13 January 1964 at Fort Riley, Kansas, and relieved from assignment to the 1st Infantry Division

Redesignated 3 April 1987 as the 2d Battalion, 26th Infantry; Headquarters concurrently transferred to the United States Army Training and Doctrine Command and activated at Fort Dix, New Jersey

Inactivated 18 July 1990 at Fort Dix, New Jersey; Headquarters concurrently withdrawn from the United States Army Training and Doctrine Command

Battalion redesignated 1 October 2005 as the 2d Battalion, 26th Infantry Regiment

Assigned 16 April 2007 to the 3d Brigade Combat Team, 1st Infantry Division, and activated at Fort Hood, Texas

== Campaign participation credit ==
Philippine Insurrection: Streamer without inscription

World War I: Montdidier-Noyon; Aisne-Marne; St. Mihiel; Meuse-Argonne; Lorraine 1917; Lorraine 1918; Picardy 1918

World War II: Algeria-French Morocco (with arrowhead); Tunisia; Sicily (with arrowhead); Normandy (with arrowhead); Northern France; Rhineland; Ardennes-Alsace; Central Europe

Vietnam: Defense; Counteroffensive; Counteroffensive, Phase II; Counteroffensive, Phase III; Tet Counteroffensive; Counteroffensive, Phase IV; Counteroffensive, Phase V; Counteroffensive, Phase VI; Tet 69/Counteroffensive; Summer-Fall 1969; Winter-Spring 1970

Kosovo: Kosovo Defense

War on Terrorism: Iraq, Afghanistan

== Decorations ==
- Navy Unit Commendation, Streamer embroidered ANBAR PROVINCE FEB 2006-FEB 2007
- Presidential Unit Citation (Army), Streamer embroidered STOLBERG
- Presidential Unit Citation (Army), Streamer embroidered ADHAMIYAH [NOV 2006-MAY 2007]
- Valorous Unit Award, Streamer embroidered AP GU
- Valorous Unit Award, Streamer embroidered SAMARRA, IRAQ
- Valorous Unit Award, Streamer embroidered SAMARRA, IRAQ (OCT-NOV 2004)
- Valorous Unit Award, Streamer embroidered KUNAR, AFGHANISTAN 2008–2009
- Meritorious Unit Commendation, Streamer embroidered IRAQ 2006-2007
- Meritorious Unit Commendation, Streamer embroidered AFGHANISTAN 2011
- Meritorious Unit Commendation, Streamer embroidered IRAQ 16-17
- Army Superior Unit Award, Streamer embroidered 1996–1997
- French Croix de Guerre with Palm, World War I, Streamer embroidered AISNE-MARNE
- French Croix de Guerre with Palm, World War I, Streamer embroidered MEUSE-ARGONNE
- French Croix de Guerre with Palm, World War II, Streamer embroidered KASSERINE
- French Croix de Guerre with Palm, World War II, Streamer embroidered NORMANDY
- French Médaille militaire, Fourragere
- Belgian Fourragere 1940
- Cited in the Order of the Day of the Belgian Army for action at Mons
- Cited in the Order of the Day of the Belgian Army for action at Eupen-Malmedy

== In popular culture ==
Marvel Superhero Captain America served in 1st Battalion, 26th Infantry Regiment. 1-26 IN is depicted in the critically acclaimed documentary Restrepo as the unit that replaces The 173rd Airborne Brigade in Korengal Valley, Afghanistan.

The 2025 film Warfare depicts a real-time recreation of an operation that occurred in Ramadi, Iraq, in November 2006. Former Navy SEAL Ray Mendoza was serving with the 26th Infantry Regiment during the events of the film. He co-directed it with filmmaker Alex Garland after working on his previous film Civil War as a military advisor.
